= ISO 259 =

Series of international standards for the romanization of Hebrew

ISO 259 is a series of international standards for the romanization of Hebrew characters into Latin characters, dating to 1984, with updated ISO 259-2 (a simplification, disregarding several vowel signs, 1994) and ISO 259-3 (Phonemic Conversion, 1999).

== ISO 259 ==
ISO 259, dating to the year 1984, is a transliteration of the Hebrew script, including the diacritical signs (niqqud) used for Biblical Hebrew.

ISO 259: Hebrew romanization
Hebrew	א	ב	ג	ד	ה	ו	ז	ח	ט	י	כ ך	ל	מ ם	נ ן	ס	ע	פ ף	צ ץ	ק	ר	ש	שׂ	שׁ	ת	׳
Latin	ʾ	b	g	d	h	w	z	ḥ	ṭ	y	k	l	m	n	s	ʿ	p	ṣ	q	r	s̀	ś	š	t	’
Hebrew	טַ		טָ		טֵ		טֶ		טִ		טֹ		טוֹ		טֻ		טוּ		טְ	חֲ		חֳ		חֱ	
Latin	a		å		e		ȩ		i		o		ŵ		u		ẇ		°	ă		ŏ		ḝ	

The dagesh (dot inside the letter) is always transcribed with an overdot: ḃ, ġ, ż, etc. The apostrophe (׳) in the table above is the Hebrew sign geresh used after some letters to write down non-Hebrew sounds: ג׳ [d͡ʒ], ז׳ [ʒ], צ׳ [t͡ʃ], etc.

== ISO 259-2 ==
ISO 259-2 simplifies the diacritical signs for vowels of ISO 259, and is designed for Modern Hebrew.

ISO 259-2: Hebrew romanization – Simplified
Hebrew	א	ב	בּ	ג	ד	ה	הּ	ו	ז	ח	ט	י	כ ך	כּ ךּ	ל	מ ם	נ ן	ס	ע	פ ף	פּ ףּ	צ ץ	ק	ר	ש	שׂ	שׁ	ת	׳
Latin	ʾ	b	ḃ	g	d	h	ḣ	w	z	ḥ	ṭ	y	k	k̇	l	m	n	s	ʿ	p	ṗ	ṣ	q	r	s̀	ś	š	t	'
Hebrew	טַ טָ			טֵ טֶ			טִ			טֹ			טוֹ			טֻ			טוּ			טְ		חֲ		חֳ		חֱ	
Latin	a			e			i			o			ŵ			u			ẇ			none		a		o		e	

The dagesh is not transcribed excepted in the indicated cases. The apostrophe (׳) in the table above is the Hebrew sign geresh used after some letters to write down non-Hebrew sounds.

== ISO 259-3 ==
ISO 259-3 is Uzzi Ornan's romanization, which reached the stage of an ISO Final Draft (FDIS) but not of a published International Standard (IS). It is designed to deliver the common structure of the Hebrew word throughout the different dialects or pronunciation styles of Hebrew, in a way that it can be reconstructed into the original Hebrew characters by both man and machine.

It is neither a character-by-character transliteration nor a phonetic transcription of one pronunciation style of Hebrew, but is instead phonemic from the viewpoint that all the different dialects and pronunciations of Hebrew through the generations can be regarded as different realizations of the same structure, and by predefined reading rules every pronunciation style can be directly derived from it.

ISO 259-3: Hebrew romanization – Phonemic
Hebrew	א	ב בּ	ג גּ	ד דּ	ה	ו	ז	ח	ט	י	כ ך כּ	ל	מ ם	נ ן	ס	ע	פ ף פּ	צ ץ	ק	ר	ש	ת	ג׳	ז׳	צ׳	שׂ
Latin	ʾ or ˀ	b	g	d	h	w	z	ḥ	ṭ	y	k	l	m	n	s	ʿ or ˁ	p	c or ç	q	r	š	t	ǧ	ž	č	ś

Hebrew	חֲ טַ טָ טָה-	חֱ טֶ טֵ טֶה- טֵה-	טִ טִי	חֳ טָ טֹ טוֹ	טֻ טוּ	טֶי טֵי	טְ
Latin	a	e	i	o	u	ei	none

Each consonant character in the Hebrew script is converted into its unique Latin character. ISO 259-3 has five vowel characters, corresponding to the five vowel phonemes of Modern Hebrew: a, e, i, o, u. In addition there is a sixth sign for denoting the vowel /ej/ or /e/ that is written followed by ⟨י⟩ in common Hebrew spelling: ei.

The dagesh forte (gemination in Biblical Hebrew) is transcribed with a double consonant. Non-phonemic vowels are ignored, such as:

- schwa טְ, which is however transcribed with an underscore (_) between two identical consonants in order to distinguish it from a geminate consonant: יְלָדִים [jeladim] "boys" = yladim, הַלְלוּיָהּ [halelujah] "Hallelujah" = hal_luyah,
- "segolate" vowel (on the second to last consonant an unaccented vowel טֶ, which can also be the vowel חַ on some laryngeal consonants, or יִ, etc.) : גֹּלֶם [ɡolem] "golem" = golm, צֹהַר [tsohar] "opening, window" = cohr,
- "furtive" pataḥ חַ (an unaccented [a] sound before some final laryngeal consonants): רוּחַ [ʁuax] "breeze, spirit" = ruḥ, but ISO 259-3 also allows (in section 5, "SIMPLIFIED VERSION") the transcription with a for non-linguistic purposes: ruaḥ.

Though the official proposal for ISO-259-3 gives only C/c as the Latin character corresponding to Hebrew צ/ץ, Ornan also provided for its alternate romanization as Ç/ç, even writing in a 2008 paper on the topic that it was his preference, and in an earlier 2003 paper especially recommending the use of Ç/ç for use in the romanization of Hebrew placenames—for example, on Israeli road signs.

== See also ==
- DIN 31635
- List of ISO transliterations
- ISO 233 for Arabic transliteration
