= Hebraization of English =

Transliteration of English language into Hebrew script

The Hebraization of English (or Hebraicization) is the use of the Hebrew alphabet to write English. Because Hebrew uses an abjad, it can render English words in multiple ways. There are many uses for hebraization, which serve as a useful tool for Israeli learners of English by indicating the pronunciation of unfamiliar letters. An example would be the English name spelled "Timothy", which can be Hebraized as "טימותי" in the Hebrew alphabet.

== Table ==
=== Consonants ===
For full spelling, when a reader is likely to err in the reading of a word, the use of niqqud or partial niqqud is recommended. This is especially true when writing foreign words, unfamiliar words, ambiguous words, or words that take a dagesh.

Single letters
Letter	Variations	Hebrew	English Examples	IPA
a	Vowel: See table below			
b	none	בּ (Bet) (full spelling ב)	but, web	b
c	Hard C	ק (Kuf)	cat, kid, unique	k
c	Soft C	ס (Samekh), שׂ (Sin) (sin not normally used for transliterations) (full spelling ש)	city, center, facade	s
d	none	ד (Dalet)	do, David	d
e	Vowel: See table below			
f	none	פ ף (Fe)	fool, leaf	f
g	Hard G	ג (Gimel)	go, get, beg	ɡ
g	Soft G	ג׳ (Gimel with geresh)	gym, joy, module	dʒ
g	French soft G	ז׳ (Zayin with geresh)	seizure, massage, vision, equation, déjà vu	ʒ
h	none	ה (He)	hen	h
j	Affricative J	ג׳ (Gimel with geresh)	job, gentle, education	dʒ
j	Fricative J	ז׳ (Zayin with geresh)	Jacques, genre, déjà vu	ʒ
k	none	ק (Kuf),	car, keep, skill	k
l	none	ל (Lamed)	like, cool	l
m	none	מ ם (Mem)	man, mom	m
n	none	נ ן (Nun)	nice, tan	n
o	Vowel: See table below			
p	none	פּ (Pe) (full spelling פ)	pen, spin, tip	p
q	Q followed by U	קְו (Kuf-Vav) (full spelling קוו)	quick, quite	kw
q	Q not followed by U	ק (Kuf),	tranq, sheqels	k
r	none	ר (Reish)	royal, brighter	ɹ,ɚ
s	Voiceless S	ס (Samekh), שׂ (Sin) (sin not normally used for transliterations) (full spelling ש)	smile, rocks, caesar	s
s	Voiced S (Z sound)	ז (Zayin)	rose, doɡs, tubs	z
s	Voiceless postalveolar S (SH sound)	שׁ (full spelling ש)	sure, suɡar, ocean, caution	ʃ
s	Voiced postalveolar S	ז׳ (Zayin with geresh)	pleasure, vision	ʒ
t	none	ט (Tet), ת (Tav) (tav not normally used for transliterations)	two, sting, bet, walked	t
u	Vowel: See table below			
v	none	ו (Vav) (at beginning of a word or in the middle, when not next to a vav acting as a vowel [/o/ or /u/]) (full spelling וו: Vav is doubled in the middle of a word but not at the beginning except if initial affix letter except "and" prefix), ב (Vet) (at end of a word or in the middle, when next to a vav acting as a vowel [/o/ or /u/])	voice, live, of	v
w	none	ו (Vav) (transliterated as a 'v' sound, but often pronounced with 'w' sound though prior knowledge), (full spelling: follows rule for Vav above) ו׳ (Vav with geresh) (non-standard (indicates 'w' sound), and not used in general transliterations)	we, kuala, persuasion	w
x	Z sound	ז (Zayin)	xylophone, xerox, xeno	z
x	KS sound	קְס (Kuf-Samekh) כְּס (Kaph-Samekh) full spelling כס	fox, text, exit	ks
x	EX sound	אֶקְס (Aleph with segol-Kuf with sh'va-Samekh) (full spelling אקס)	X-ray, X’s and O’s	e̞ks
y	Consonant	י (Yud) (full spelling יי: Yud is doubled in the middle of a word for /ei, ai/ but not at the beginning or after affix letters)	yes, fjord, eureka, onion	j
y	Vowel	Vowel: See table below		
z	none	ז (Zayin)	zebra, realize	z
Multiple letters
Letters	Variations	Hebrew	English Examples	IPA
ng	none	נג (Nun-Gimel),	thank, anger, song	ŋ
ch	Normal CH	צ׳ (Tsadi with geresh)	chair, nature, cello	tʃ
ch	K sound	כ ך (Chaph) (transliterated as an /x/ sound (like German CH below), because a 'ch' making a 'k' sound is from the Greek letter Chi which also makes the /x/ sound.), ק (Kuf) (indicates 'k' sound, only used for a direct transliteration)	chaos, character, psychology	k
ch	German CH	ח (Het) (at beginning of a word), כ ך (Chaph) (usually in the middle of a word, always at end of a word)	Scottish loch, chanukah	χ
th	Voiceless dental fricative	ת (Tav) (transliterated as a 't' sound), ת׳ (Tav with geresh) (more accurate (indicates 'th' sound), but not used in general transliterations)	thing, teeth	t~θ~s
th	Voiced dental fricative	ד (Dalet) (transliterated as a 'd' sound), ד׳ (Dalet with geresh) (more accurate (indicates 'th' sound), but not used in general transliterations)	this, breathe, father	d~ð~z
sh	none	שׁ (Shin) (full spelling ש)	she, flash, chef, crotchet	ʃ
ts	none	צ ץ (Tsadi), תס (Tav-Samekh) (tav-samekh not normally used for transliterations) תשׂ (Tav-Sin) (tav-sin not normally used for transliterations) (full spelling תש)	pizza, pretzel, tsunami, hats	ts

==== Final letters ====
Five letters in Hebrew, Nun, Mem, Tsadi, Pe/Fe, and Kaf, all have final or sofit (Hebrew: סוֹפִית sofit) forms. That means, that the letters' appearances change when they are at the end of words from כ, פ, צ, מ, נ to ך, ף, ץ, ם, ן respectively. Final forms are used in transliteration when appropriate, with the exception of foreign words ending in a [p] sound, which retain the non-final form of פ, such as "קטשופ" ("ketchup"), as the word with a normal final form would be pronounced "ketchuph".

=== Vowels and diphthongs ===
Since vowels are not consistent in English, they are more difficult to transliterate into other languages. Sometimes they are just transcribed by the actual English letter, and other times by its actual pronunciation (which also varies). For the most accurate transliteration, below is a table describing the different vowel sounds and their corresponding letters.

Hebrew has only 5 vowel sounds, with lack of discrimination in Hebrew between long and short vowels. In comparison, English which has around 12 vowel sounds (5 long, 7 short) depending on dialect. As a result, words such as sit/seat (/sɪt/ and /siːt/), hat/hut (/hæt/ and /hʌt/), and cop/cope (/kɒp/ and /koʊp/) are transliterated as the Hebrew vowels /i/, /a/ and /o/. The English pronunciation can be known through prior context.

Vowels will sometimes be put into Hebrew by their letters, and not by their sounds, even though it is less accurate phonetically. For example, any sort of "a" sound written with the letter "o", (ex. mom, monitor, soft), will often be transliterated as an "o" vowel, that is, with a vav (ו). The same is the case for an -or ending (pronounced -er), it will also often be transliterated with a vav as well. If the word with the "a" sound (such as "a" or "ah"), as in "ta ta", or "spa", it will be treated as an "a".

For full spelling, the niqqud (the "dots") is simply omitted, if partial vowelling is desired, especially for letters like Vav, then the niqqud is retained.

The picture of the "O" represents whatever Hebrew letter is used.

Vowels
Letter	Hebrew	English Examples	IPA	IPA after trans.
a	סָ (letter with kamatz), (letter with patah), אַ/אָ (Alef with kamatz or patach) (Not part of ordinary Hebrew spelling but sometimes used in transliterations)	run, enough	a/ʌ	ä
a	Note for below: This sound (æ) (ex. hat) does not exist in Hebrew. As a result, it is always transliterated as if it were an (a) sound (ex. hut).	mat, hat	æ	ä
a	סָ (letter with kamatz), (letter with patah), אַ/אָ (Alef with kamatz or patach) (Not part of ordinary Hebrew spelling but sometimes used in transliterations)	mat, hat	æ	ä
a	Note for below: These sounds (ɑ/ɒ) (ex. pawn) do not exist in Hebrew. As a result, it is transliterated as if it were an (a) sound (ex. pun).	spa, pot, law	ɑː/ɒː	ä
a	סָ (letter with kamatz), (letter with patah), אַ/אָ (Alef with kamatz or patach) (Not part of ordinary Hebrew spelling but sometimes used in transliterations)	spa, pot, law	ɑː/ɒː	ä
e	(letter with segol), (letter with zeire) (more ambiguous)	met, ɡet, enter	e	e̞
i	י (Yud preceded by letter with hirik), (letter with hirik) (not used in full spelling)	tiny, key, he, swing	iː	i
i	Note for below: This sound (ɪ) (ex. mitt) does not exist in Hebrew. As a result, it is always transliterated as if it were an (i) sound (ex. meet).	tip, myth	ɪ	i
i	י (Yud preceded by letter with hirik), (letter with hirik) (not used in full spelling)	tip, myth	ɪ	i
o	וֹ (Vav with holam), סֹ (succeeding letter with cholom) (not used in full spelling)	no, tow, moan, toll	o/əʊ	o̞
o	Note for below: These sounds (ɑ/ɒ) (ex. cop) do not exist in Modern Hebrew. As a result, it is transliterated as if it were an (o) sound (ex. cope).	mop, hot, wash, tall, awe, on	ɑː/ɒ/ɔː	o̞
o	וֹ (Vav with holam), סֹ (succeeding letter with cholom) (not used in full spelling)	mop, hot, wash, tall, awe, on	ɑː/ɒ/ɔː	o̞
uː	וּ (Vav with shuruk), (letter with kubutz) (not used in full spelling)	tube, soon, through	uː	u
uː	Note for below: This sound (ʊ) (ex. look) does not exist in Hebrew. As a result, it is always transliterated as if it were an (u) sound (ex. luke).	look, put, could	ʊ̜/ɯ̽	u
uː	וּ (Vav with shuruk), (letter with kubutz) (not used in full spelling)	look, put, could	ʊ̜/ɯ̽	u
Diphthongs
ei	יי (Yud-Yud) (used specifically in transliterations), י (letter with segol-Yud) (not normally used for transliterations), (letter with zeire) (not normally used for transliterations, also more ambiguous and used only in certain words)	day, wait, grey	ej	e̞j
ai	יי (Yud-Yud) (used specifically in transliterations), יסָ (letter with kamatz-Yud) (not normally used for transliterations), י (letter with patah-Yud) (not normally used for transliterations)	fine, why	aj	äj
oi	וֹי (Vav with holam male-Yud)	loin, boy	oj	o̞j
ui	וּי (Vav with shuruk-Yud)	sweep, queen	uj	uj
ao	או (Alef-Vav)	town, mouse, pout	aʊ	äw
yu	יוּ (Yud-Vav with shuruk)	cute, arɡue, unit, few, you	ju	ju
Hiatus
ui	וּאִי (Vav with shuruk-Alef-Yud with hirik-Yud)	Louie, gooey, chewy	uːiː	u.i

==== At the beginning or end of a word ====
The following are special cases for vowels at the beginning or end of a word. "O", "U", or "I" sound different at the beginning of a word, because they have no consonants before them. Therefore, Vav and Yud, by themselves, would be assumed to be their consonant versions ("V" and "Y" respectively) and not their vowel versions.

If the sounds (that is, vowels with no consonants before it) are made in the middle of a word, the same thing is done as shown below (or looking up, replace the "ס" with the aleph).

For full spelling, the niqqud (the "dots") are simply omitted.

At the beginning of a word
Letter	Hebrew	English Examples	IPA	IPA after trans.
o	אוֹ (Aleph-Vav with holam) עוֹ (Ayin-Vav with holam) (not normally used for transliterations)	open	o	o̞
u	אוּ (Aleph-Vav with shuruk) עוּ (Ayin-Vav with shuruk) (not normally used for transliterations)	Uma	u/ʊ	u
i/ee	אִי (Aleph with hiriq-Yud) עִי (Ayin with hiriq-Yud) (not normally used for transliterations); Note: The subsequent yud in both the Aleph-Yud and Ayin-Yud above is only necessary in full spelling.	into, eel	ɪ/i	i
ei/ai	איי (Aleph-Yud-Yud)	ice, ace, eiɡht	ej/aj	e̞j/äj
a	אָ (Aleph with kamatz) or אַ (Aleph with patach) עָ/עַ (Ayin with kamatz or patach) (not normally used for transliterations)	all, off	a	ä
e	אֶ (Aleph with segol) עֶ (Ayin with segol) (not normally used for transliterations)	Edward	e	e̞
At the end of a word
a	הסָ (Letter with kamatz-He) or ה (Letter with patach-He) א or ע (Aleph or Ayin) (not normally used for transliterations)	cola	a	ä
e	ה (Letter with segol-He)	almeh	e	e̞

== See also ==
- International Phonetic Alphabet
- Help:IPA/Hebrew
- Hebrew phonology
- Hebrew alphabet
- Romanization of Hebrew
- Hebraization of surnames
