= Modern Hebrew phonology =

Sounds and pronunciation of Modern Hebrew

Modern Hebrew has 25 to 27 consonants and 5 vowels, depending on the speaker and the analysis.

Hebrew has been used primarily for liturgical, literary, and scholarly purposes for most of the past two millennia. As a consequence, its pronunciation was strongly influenced by the vernacular of individual Jewish communities. With the revival of Hebrew as a native language, and especially with the establishment of Israel, the pronunciation of the modern language rapidly coalesced.

The two main accents of modern Hebrew are Oriental and Non-Oriental. Oriental Hebrew was chosen as the preferred accent for Israel by the Academy of the Hebrew Language, but has since declined in popularity. The description in this article follows the language as it is pronounced by native Israeli speakers of the younger generations.

== Oriental and non-Oriental accents ==
According to the Academy of the Hebrew Language, in the 1880s (the time of the beginning of the Zionist movement and the Hebrew revival) there were three groups of Hebrew regional accents: Ashkenazi (Eastern European), Sephardi (Southern European and Anatolian), and Mizrahi (Middle Eastern, Iranian, and North African). Over time features of these systems of pronunciation merged, and at present scholars identify two main pronunciations of modern (i.e., not liturgical) Hebrew: Oriental and Non-Oriental. Oriental Hebrew displays traits of an Arabic substrate. Elder oriental speakers tend to use an alveolar trill [r], preserve the pharyngeal consonants /ħ/ and (less commonly) /ʕ/, preserve gemination, and pronounce /e/ in some places where non-Oriental speakers do not have a vowel (the shva na). A limited number of Oriental speakers, for example elderly Yemenite Jews, even maintain some pharyngealized (emphatic) consonants also found in Arabic, such as /sˤ/ for Biblical /tsʼ/. Israeli Arabs ordinarily use the Oriental pronunciation, vocalising the ‘ayin (ע) as /ʕ/, resh (ר) as [r] and, less frequently, the ḥet (ח) as /ħ/.

=== Pronunciation of ע ===
Non-Oriental (and General Israeli) pronunciation mostly lost the emphatic and pharyngeal sounds of Biblical Hebrew under the influence of European languages (Slavic and Germanic for Ashkenazim and Romance for Sephardim). The pharyngeals /ħ/ and /ʕ/ are preserved by older Oriental speakers. Dialectally, Georgian Jews pronounce /ʕ/ as [qʼ], while Western European Sephardim and Dutch Ashkenazim traditionally pronounce it [ŋ], a pronunciation that can also be found in the Italian tradition and, historically, in south-west Germany. However, according to Sephardic and Ashkenazic authorities, such as the Mishnah Berurah and the Shulchan Aruch and Mishneh Torah, /ʕ/ is the proper pronunciation. Thus, it is still pronounced as such by some Sephardim and Ashkenazim.

Notwithstanding, in some cases, the letter may still be pronounced as a weaker glottal stop or pharyngeal sound by Israeli speakers, for example to disambiguate meaning - for instance, "בעלי" (my husband) features a stop on the ע which among others may help disambiguate from "בא לי" (all right with me, both words usually pronounced jointly without stop).

=== Pronunciation of ר ===
The classical pronunciation associated with the consonant ר rêš was a flap [ɾ], and was grammatically ungeminable. In most dialects of Hebrew among the Jewish diaspora, it remained a flap or a trill [r]. However, in some Ashkenazi dialects of northern Europe it was a uvular rhotic, either a trill [ʀ] or a fricative [ʁ]. This was because certain native dialects of Yiddish were spoken that way, and the liturgical Hebrew of these speakers carried the Yiddish pronunciation. Some Iraqi Jews also pronounce rêš as a uvular [ʀ], reflecting Baghdad Jewish Arabic.

Though an Ashkenazi Jew in the Russian Empire, Eliezer Ben-Yehuda based his Standard Hebrew on Sephardi Hebrew, originally spoken in Spain, and therefore recommended an alveolar [r]. However, just like him, the first waves of Jews to resettle in the Holy Land were Ashkenazi, and Standard Hebrew would come to be spoken with some aspects of their native pronunciation. Consequently, by now nearly all Israeli Jews pronounce the consonant ר rêš as a uvular fricative ([ʁ̞]), which also exists in certain forms of Yiddish.

Many Jewish immigrants to Israel spoke a variety of Arabic in their countries of origin, and pronounced the Hebrew rhotic consonant /ʁ/ as an alveolar trill, identical to Arabic ر rāʾ, and which followed the conventions of old Hebrew. In modern Ashkenazi, Sephardi, and Mizrahi poetry and folk music, as well as in the standard (or "standardised") Hebrew used in the Israeli media, an alveolar rhotic is sometimes used.

== Consonants ==
The following table lists the consonant phonemes of Israeli Hebrew in IPA transcription:

	Labial		Alveolar		Palatal		Velar/ uvular		Pharyn- geal		Glottal
Stop	p	b	t	d			k	ɡ			ʔ^{2}
Affricate			ts	dz*	tʃ^{4}*	dʒ*					
Fricative	f	v	s	z	ʃ	ʒ*	χ^{1}	ʁ^{3}	(ħ^{1}	ʕ^{2})	h^{2}
Nasal		m		n							
Approximant				l		j		w*			

* Phoneme was introduced through loanwords.
^{1} In modern Hebrew /ħ/ for ח has merged with /x/ (which was traditionally used only for fricative כ) into /χ/. Some older Mizrahi speakers still separate these (as explained above). /χ/ is often realized as a voiceless uvular trill [ʀ̥].
^{2} The glottal consonants tend to be elided, which is most common in unstressed syllables. In informal speech, elision may occur in stressed syllables as well, whereas in careful or formal speech, glottals may be retained in all positions. In modern Hebrew /ʕ/ for ע has been absorbed by /ʔ/, which was traditionally used only for א. Again, some speakers still separate these.
^{3} /ʁ/ is usually pronounced as a uvular approximant [ʁ̞], and sometimes as a uvular trill [ʀ], alveolar trill [r] or alveolar flap [ɾ], depending on the background of the speaker.
^{4} While the phoneme /tʃ/ צ׳ was introduced through borrowings, it can appear in native words as a sequence of /t/ ת and /ʃ/ שׁ as in תְּשׁוּקָה /tʃuˈka/.

For many young speakers, obstruents assimilate in voicing. Voiceless obstruents (stops/affricates /p, t, ts, tʃ, k/ and fricatives /f, s, ʃ, χ/) become voiced ([b, d, dz, dʒ, ɡ, v, z, ʒ, ʁ]) when they appear immediately before voiced obstruents, and vice versa. For example:

- לִסְגֹּר /lisˈɡoʁ/ > [lizˈɡoʁ] ('to close'), /s/ > [z]
- זְכוּת /zχut/ > [sχut] ('a right'), /z/ > [s]
- חֶשְׁבּוֹן /χeʃˈbon/ > [χeʒˈbon] ('a bill'), /ʃ/ > [ʒ]
- מַדְפֶּסֶת /madˈpeset/ > [matˈpeset] ('a printer'), /d/ > [t]
- אַבְטָחָה /avtaˈχa/ > [aftaˈχa] ('security'), /v/ > [f]

/n/ is pronounced [ŋ] before velar consonants.

=== Illustrative words ===
Letter		Example word		
IPA	Hebrew	IPA	Hebrew	English
/p/	פּ	/ˈpe/	פֶּה	mouth
/m/	מ	/ma/	מָה	what
/f/	פ	/oˈfe/	אוֹפֶה	baker
/t/	ת, ט	/ˈtan/	תַּן	jackal
/ts/	צ	/ˈtsi/	צִי	fleet
/s/	ס, שׂ	/ˈsof/	סוֹף	end
/n/	נ	/ˈnes/	נֵס	miracle
/tʃ/	צ׳, תשׁ	/tʃuˈka/	תְּשׁוּקָה	passion
/ʃ/	שׁ	/ʃaˈna/	שָׁנָה	year
/j/	י	/ˈjom/	יוֹם	day
/k/	כּ, ק	/ˈkol/	כֹּל	all
/χ/	כ, ח	/eχ/	אֵיךְ	how
/ħ/	ח	/ˈħam/	חַם	hot

Letter		Example word		
IPA	Hebrew	IPA	Hebrew	English
/ʔ/	א, ע	/ʁeʔaˈjon/	רֵאָיוֹן	interview
/b/	בּ	/ˈben/	בֵּן	son
/v/	ב, ו	/ˈnevel/	נֵבֶל	harp
/d/	ד	/ˈdelek/	דֶּלֶק	fuel
/z/	ז	/ze/	זֶה	this
/l/	ל	/ˈlo/	לֹא	no
/dʒ/	ג׳	/dʒiˈʁafa/	גִּ׳ירָפָה	giraffe
/ʒ/	ז׳	/ˈbeʒ/	בֵּז׳	beige
/w/	ו	/ˈpinɡwin/	פִּינְגְּוִין	penguin
/ɡ/	ג	/ɡam/	גַּם	also
/ʁ/	ר	/ˈʁoʃ/	רֹאשׁ	head
/ʕ/	ע	/ʕim/	עִם	with
/h/	ה	/ˈhed/	הֵד	echo

=== Historical sound changes ===
Standard Israeli Hebrew (SIH) phonology, based on the Sephardic Hebrew pronunciation tradition, has a number of differences from Biblical Hebrew (BH) and Mishnaic Hebrew (MH) in the form of splits and mergers.

- BH/MH /t/ and /tˤ/ merged into SIH /t/.
- BH/MH /k/ and /q/ merged into SIH /k/.
- BH/MH /ʕ/ and /ʔ/ generally merge into SIH /ʔ/ or became silent, but the distinction is maintained in the speech of older Sephardim and is reintroduced in the speech of some other speakers.
- BH/MH /p/ had two allophones, [p] and [ɸ], which split into separate phonemes /p/ and /f/ in SIH.
- BH/MH /b/ had two allophones, [b] and [β]. The [β] allophone merged with /w/ into SIH /v/. A new phoneme /w/ was introduced in loanwords (see Hebrew vav as consonant), so SIH has phonemic /b, v, w/.
- BH/MH /k/ had two allophones, [k] and [x]. The [k] allophone merged with /q/ into SIH /k/, while the [x] allophone merged with /ħ/ into SIH /χ/, though a distinction between /χ/ and /ħ/ is maintained in the speech of older Sephardim.
- BH/MH [θ], [ð] and [ɣ] merged into their plosive counterparts, /t/, /d/ and /ɡ/.
- BH/MH /sˤ/ de-pharyngealized and affricated to SIH /t͡s/.
- BH/MH /r/ backed to SIH /ʁ/; the former pronunciation is still used by Sephardi and Mizrahi speakers.

==== Spirantization ====
The consonant pairs [b]–[v] (archaically [β]), [k]–[χ] (archaically [x]), and [p]–[f] (archaically [ɸ]) were historically allophonic, as a consequence of a phenomenon of spirantization known as begadkefat under the influence of the Aramaic language on BH/MH. In Modern Hebrew, the above six sounds are phonemic.

The full inventory of Hebrew consonants which undergo and/or underwent spirantization are:

Letter		Begadkefat	
Name	Hebrew	Biblical / Mishnaic	Modern / Israeli
Bet	ב	[b]–[β]	[b]–[v]
Gimel	ג	[ɡ]–[ɣ]	[ɡ]
Dalet	ד	[d]–[ð]	[d]
Kaph	כ	[k]–[x]	[k]–[χ]
Pe	פ	[p]–[ɸ]	[p]–[f]
Taw	ת	[t]–[θ]	[t]

However, the above-mentioned allophonic alternation of BH/MH [t]–[θ], [d]–[ð] and [ɡ]–[ɣ] was lost in Modern Hebrew, with these six allophones merging into simple /t, d, ɡ/.

These phonemic changes were partly due to the mergers noted above, to the loss of consonant gemination, which had distinguished stops from their fricative allophones in intervocalic position, and the introduction of syllable-initial /f/ and non-syllable-initial /p/ and /b/ in loan words. Spirantization still occurs in verbal and nominal derivation, but now the alternations /b/–/v/, /k/–/χ/, and /p/–/f/ are phonemic rather than allophonic.

=== Loss of final H consonant ===
In Traditional Hebrew words can end with an H consonant, e.g. when the suffix "-ah" is used, meaning "her" (see Mappiq). The final H sound is hardly ever pronounced in Modern Hebrew. However, the final H with Mappiq still retains the guttural characteristic that it should take a patach and render the pronunciation /a(h)/ at the end of the word, for example, גָּבוֹהַּ gavoa(h) ("tall").

== Vowels ==
The vowel phonemes of Modern Hebrew

Modern Hebrew has a simple five-vowel system.

	Front	Central	Back
High	i		u
Mid	e		o
Low		a	

Vowel length is non-contrastive and consecutive identical vowels are allowed in the case of glottal consonant elision, e.g. שאלה /ʃe.ʔe.ˈla/ → [ʃe.e.ˈla] vs שלה [ʃe.ˈla] and רעם /ˈʁa.ʔam/ → [ˈʁa.am] vs רם [ʁam].

There are two native diphthongs, /aj/ and /ej/, and two loaned diphthongs /oj/ and /aw/.

Phoneme	Example		
i	/iʃ/	אִישׁ	'man'
u	/aduˈma/	אֲדֻמָּה	'red' (f)
e	/em/	אֵם	'mother'
o	/oʁ/	אוֹר	'light'
a	/av/	אָב	'father'

=== Vowel length ===
In most Masoretic traditions of Biblical Hebrew, each vowel had three forms: long, short and interrupted (chataf). However, there is no audible distinction between the three in Modern Hebrew, except that /e/ is often pronounced [ej] as in Ashkenazi Hebrew.

=== Shva ===
Modern pronunciation does not follow traditional use of the niqqud (diacritic) "shva". In Modern Hebrew, words written with a shva may be pronounced with either /e/ or without any vowel, and this does not correspond well to how the word was pronounced historically. For example, the first shva in the word קִמַּטְתְּ 'you (fem.) crumpled' is pronounced /e/ (/kiˈmatet/) though historically it was silent, whereas the shva in זְמַן ('time'), which was pronounced historically, is usually silent ([zman]). Orthographic shva is generally pronounced /e/ in prefixes such as ve- ('and') and be- ('in'), or when following another shva in grammatical patterns, as in /tilmeˈdi/ ('you [f. sg.] will learn'). An epenthetic /e/ appears when necessary to avoid violating a phonological constraint, such as between two consonants that are identical or differ only in voicing (e.g. /laˈmadeti/ 'I learned', not */laˈmadti/) (though this rule is lost in some younger speakers and quick speech) or when an impermissible initial cluster would result (e.g. */rC-/ or */Cʔ-/, where C stands for any consonant). Guttural consonants (א, ה, ח, ע) rarely take a shva. Instead, they can take reduced segol (חֱ), reduced patach (חֲ), or reduced kamatz (חֳ).

== Stress ==
Stress is phonemic in Modern Hebrew. There are two frequent patterns of lexical stress, on the last syllable (milrá מִלְּרַע) and on the penultimate syllable (mil‘él מִלְּעֵיל). Final stress has traditionally been more frequent, but in the colloquial language many words are shifting to penultimate stress. Contrary to the prescribed standard, some words exhibit stress on the antepenultimate syllable or even farther back. This often occurs in loanwords, e.g. פּוֹלִיטִיקָה /poˈlitika/ ('politics'), and sometimes in native colloquial compounds, e.g. אֵיכְשֶׁהוּ /ˈeχʃehu/ ('somehow'). Colloquial stress has often shifted from the last syllable to the penultimate, e.g. כּוֹבַע 'hat', normative /koˈvaʕ/ (Ezekiel 38 5) or /ˈkovaʕ/ (Isaiah 59 17), colloquial (always) /ˈkovaʕ/; שׁוֹבָךְ ('dovecote'), normative /ʃoˈvaχ/, colloquial /ˈʃovaχ/. This shift is common in the colloquial pronunciation of many personal names, for example דָּוִד ('David'), normative /daˈvid/, colloquial /ˈdavid/.

Historically, stress was phonemic, but bore low functional load. While minimal pairs existed (e.g. בָּֽנוּ /ˈbaːnuː/, 'in/with us' and בָּנֽוּ /baːˈnuː/, 'they built'), stress was mostly predictable, depending on syllable weight (that is, vowel length and whether a syllable ended in a consonant). Because spoken Israeli Hebrew has lost gemination (a common source of syllable-final consonants) as well as the original distinction between long and short vowels, but the position of the stress often remained where it had been, stress has become phonemic, as the following table illustrates. Phonetically, the following word pairs differ only in the location of the stress; orthographically they differ also in the written representation of vowel length of the vowels (assuming the vowels are even written):

Usual spelling (ktiv hasar niqqud)	Penultimate stress			Final stress		
Usual spelling (ktiv hasar niqqud)	spelling with vowel diacritics	pronunciation	translation	spelling with vowel diacritics	pronunciation	translation
ילד	יֶלֶד	/ˈjeled/	boy	יֵלֵד	/jeˈled/	will give birth (m.sg. 3rd person)
אכל, אוכל	אֹכֶל	/ˈoχel/	food	אוֹכֵל	/oˈχel/	eating (m.sg.)
בקר, בוקר	בֹּקֶר	/ˈbokeʁ/	morning	בּוֹקֵר	/boˈkeʁ/	cowboy

== Morphophonology ==
In fast-spoken colloquial Hebrew, when a vowel falls beyond two syllables from the main stress of a word or phrase, it may be reduced or elided. For example:

זֹאת אוֹמֶרֶת
/zot oˈmeʁet/ > [stoˈmeʁet] ('that is to say')

אֵיךְ קוֹרְאִים לְךָ?
/eχ koʁˈʔim leˈχa/ > [ˌeχkoˈʁimχa] (what's your name, lit. 'How are you called?')

When /l/ follows an unstressed vowel, it is sometimes elided, possibly with the surrounding vowels:

אַבָּא שֶׁלָּכֶם
/ˈaba ʃelaˈχem/ > [ˈabaʃχem] ('your father')

הוּא יִתֵּן לְךָ
/hu jiˈten leˈχa/ > [uiˈtenχa] ('he will give / let you')

Syllables /ʁV/ drop before /χ/ except at the end of a prosodic unit:

בְּדֶרֶךְ כְּלָל
/beˈdeʁeχ klal/ > [beˈdeχklal] ('usually')

but: הוּא בַּדֶּרֶךְ [u baˈdeʁeχ] ('he is on his way') at the end of a prosodic unit.

Sequences of dental stops reduce to a single consonant, again except at the end of a prosodic unit:

אֲנִי לָמַדְתִּי פַּעַם
/aˈni laˈmadeti ˈpaʕam/ > [aˌnilaˈmatipa:m] ('I once studied')

but: שֶׁלָּמַדְתִּי [ʃelaˈmadeti] ('that I studied')
