= Begadkefat =

Phonological pattern in Hebrew

Begadkefat (also begedkefet) is the phenomenon of lenition affecting the non-emphatic stop consonants of Biblical Hebrew and Aramaic when they are preceded by a vowel and not geminated. The name is also given to similar cases of spirantization of post-vocalic plosives in other languages; for instance, in Jerba Berber.

The phenomenon's name comprises these six consonants with haphazard vowels for pronunciation: BeGaDKePaT. The Hebrew term בֶּגֶ״ד כֶּפֶ״ת (Modern Hebrew /ˌbeɡedˈkefet/) denotes the letters themselves (rather than the phenomenon of spirantization). If a begadkefat is at the beginning of a word and is preceded by a word ending in an open syllable, then there is no dagesh.

Begedkefet spirantization developed during the Biblical Hebrew period due to Aramaic influence. Its time of emergence can be found by noting that the Old Aramaic phonemes /θ/, /ð/ disappeared in the 7th century BC. During this period all six plosive/fricative pairs were allophonic.

In Modern Hebrew, three of the six letters, ב (bet), כ (kaf) and פ (pe) each still denotes a stop–fricative variant pair; however, in Modern Hebrew these variants are no longer purely allophonic (see below). Although orthographic variants of ג (gimel), ד (daleth) and ת (taw) still exist, these letters' pronunciation always remains acoustically and phonologically indistinguishable. (Note: In modern Hebrew, the letter gimel modified by the diacritic geresh – ג׳ – is pronounced as the affricate [dʒ]; this, however, denotes a separate phoneme, not connected to the phenomenon of spirantization: compare e.g. גז /ɡez/ ("fleece") ←→ ג׳ז /dʒez/ ("jazz"); חג /χaɡ/ ("holiday") ←→ חג׳ /χadʒ/ ("the Hajj"). Conversely, dalet and tav with a geresh – ד׳ and ת׳ – respectively do denote the fricatives [ð] and [θ], however never as sounds in Hebrew words or even loanwords, but are rather used exclusively for the hebraization of foreign language texts or the transliteration of foreign names. Also these modern Hebrew variants have nothing to do with the phenomenon of spirantization.)

In Ashkenazi Hebrew and in Yiddish borrowings from it, ת without dagesh still denotes a fricative variant, which is pronounced [s], which diverged from Biblical/Mishnaic [θ].

The only pronunciation tradition to preserve and distinguish all begadkefat letters is Yemenite Hebrew. However, in Yemenite Hebrew, gimel with dagesh is a voiced postalveolar affricate [d͡ʒ] under the influence of Judeo-Yemeni Arabic; it diverged from Mishnaic Hebrew [ɡ].

== Orthography ==
The phenomenon is attributed to the following allophonic consonants:

		Plosives		Spirants		Hebrew Notes	
		Hebrew	Syriac	Hebrew	Syriac	Biblical, Mishnaic	Standard Israeli
Bet	Letter	בּ	ܒ݁	ב	ܒ݂	[β]	[v]
Bet	IPA	[b]		[β]		-	
Gimel	Letter	גּ	ܓ݁	ג	ܓ݂	[ɣ]	[ɡ]
Gimel	IPA	[ɡ]		[ɣ]		-	
Dalet	Letter	דּ	ܕ݁	ד	ܕ݂	[ð]	[d]
Dalet	IPA	[d]		[ð]		-	
Kaph	Letter	כּ	ܟ݁	כ	ܟ݂	[x]	[χ]
Kaph	IPA	[k]		[x]		-	
Pe	Letter	פּ	ܦ݁	פ	ܦ݂	[ɸ]	[f]
Pe	IPA	[p]		[ɸ]		-	
Taw	Letter	תּ	ܬ݁	ת	ܬ݂	[θ]	[t]
Taw	IPA	[t]		[θ]		-	

In Hebrew writing with niqqud, a dot in the center of one of these letters, called dagesh ( ּ ), marks the plosive articulation:

- at the beginning of a word (Note: In Hebrew texts that are not modern, begedkefet letters at the beginning of a word preceded by a vowel are sometimes written without a dagesh and therefore pronounced as fricatives, e.g. "אֲשֶׁר־בּוֹ פְרִי־עֵץ" (/aʃer bo fri ʕets/, Genesis 1, 29), but not always – e.g. "עֹשֶׂה פְּרִי" (/ʕose pri/, Genesis 1, 11 and 1, 12). This is governed by the stress and cantillation mark of the preceding word, but the detailed rules are beyond the scope of this article.) or after a consonant (in which cases it is termed "dagesh qal" (Note: In modern Hebrew ktiv menuqad, the dagesh qal is marked also in the three begedkefet letters which can no longer denote a fricative variant – ג ([ɡ]), ד ([d]) and ת ([t]) – conserving the masoretic niqqud tradition.)),
- when the sound is – or was historically – geminated (in which case it is termed "dagesh ẖazaq", a mark for historical gemination in most other consonants of the language as well), and
- in some modern Hebrew words independently of these conditions (see below).

A line (similar to a macron) placed above it, called "rafe" ( ֿ ), marks in Yiddish (and rarely in Hebrew) the fricative articulation.

== In Modern Hebrew ==
As mentioned above, the fricative variants of [ɡ], [d] and [t] no longer exist in modern Hebrew. (However, Hebrew does have the guttural R consonant /ʁ/ which is the voiced counterpart of /χ/ and sounds similar to Mizrahi Hebrew's fricative variant of [ɡ] ḡimel as well as Arabic's غ ġayn, both of which are [ɣ~ʁ]. Modern Hebrew ר resh can still sporadically be found standing in for this phoneme, for example in the Hebrew rendering of Raleb (Ghaleb) Majadele's name.) The three remaining pairs /b/~/v/, /k/~/χ/, and /p/~/f/ still sometimes alternate, as demonstrated in inflections of many roots in which the roots' meaning is retained despite variation of begedkefet letters' manner of articulation, e.g.,

in verbs:
• בוא ← תבוא	/bo/ → /taˈvo/	("come" (imperative) → "you will come"),
• שבר ← נשבר	/ʃaˈvaʁ/ → /niʃˈbaʁ/	("broke" (transitive) → "broke" (intransitive),
• כתב ← יכתוב	/kaˈtav/ → /jiχˈtov/	("he wrote" → "he will write"),
• זכר ← יזכור	/zaˈχaʁ/ → /jizˈkoʁ/	("he remembered" → "he will remember"),
• פנית ← לפנות	/paˈnit/ → /lifˈnot/	("you (f.) turned" → "to turn"),
• שפטת ← לשפוט	/ʃaˈfatet/ → /liʃˈpot/	("you (f.) judged" → "to judge "),
or in nouns:
• ערב ← ערביים	/ˈeʁev/ → /aʁˈbajim/	("evening" → "twilight"),
• מלך ← מלכה	/ˈmeleχ/ → /malˈka/	("king" → "queen"),
• אלף ← אלפית	/ˈelef/ → /alˈpit/	("a thousand" → "a thousandth"),

however, in Modern Hebrew, stop and fricative variants of ב, כ and פ are distinct phonemes, and there are minimal pairs:

• אִפֵּר – אִפֵר	/iˈpeʁ/ – /iˈfeʁ/	("applied make up" – "tipped ash"),
• פִּסְפֵּס – פִסְפֵס	/pisˈpes/ – /fisˈfes/	("striped" – "missed"),
• הִתְחַבֵּר – הִתְחַבֵר	/hitχaˈbeʁ/ – /hitχaˈveʁ/	("connected" – "made friends (with)"),
• הִשְׁתַּבֵּץ – הִשְׁתַּבֵץ	/hiʃtaˈbets/ – /hiʃtaˈvets/	("got integrated" – "was shocked"),

and consider, e.g.:

•	לככב "to star", whose common pronunciation /lekaˈχev/ preserves the manner of articulation of each kaf in the word it is derived from: כּוֹכָב /koˈχav/ "a star" (first stop, then fricative), as opposed to the prescribed pronunciation /leχaˈkev/, which regards the variation in pronunciation of kaf /χ/ ←→ /k/ as allophonic and determines its manner of articulation according to historical phonological principles; or:
•	similarly, לרכל "to gossip", whose prescribed pronunciation /leʁaˈkel/ is colloquially rejected, commonly pronounced /leʁaˈχel/, preserving the fricative manner of articulation in related nouns (e.g. רכילות /ʁeχiˈlut/ "gossip", רכלן /ʁaχˈlan/ "gossiper").

This phonemic divergence is due to a number of factors, amongst others:

- due to loss of consonant gemination in modern Hebrew, which formerly distinguished the stop members of the pairs from the fricatives when intervocalic – e.g. in the inflections:

• קפץ ← קיפץ	/kaˈfats/ → /kiˈpets/, historically /kipˈpets/	("jumped" → "hopped"),
• שבר ← שיבר	/ʃaˈvar/ → /ʃiˈber/, historically /ʃibˈber/	("broke" → "shattered"),
• שכן ← שיכן	/ʃaˈχan/ → /ʃiˈken/, historically /ʃikˈken/	("resided" → "housed"),

- due to the introduction, through foreign borrowings, of:

• syllable-initial /f/ (e.g. פברק /fibˈʁek/ "fabricated"),
• non-syllable-initial /p/ (e.g. הפנט /hipˈnet/ "hypnotized")
• non-syllable-initial /b/ (e.g. פברק /fibˈʁek/ "fabricated"), ג׳וֹבּ /dʒob/ "job", קוּבּ /kub/ "cubic meter", פָּאבּ /pab/ "pub").

Even aside from borrowings or lost gemination, common Israeli pronunciation sometimes violates the original phonological principle "stop variant after a consonant; fricative after a vowel", although this principle is still prescribed as standard by the Academy of the Hebrew Language, e.g.:

- The words מעבורת (ferry) and מעברות (refugee absorption camps), whose respective prescribed pronunciation is /maʕˈboʁet/ and /maʕbaˈʁot/, are commonly pronounced /ma.aˈboʁet/ and /ma.abaˈʁot/, replacing the consonant (/ʕ/) with a vowel (/a/), but still preferring the stop variant /b/ to its fricative counterpoint /v/.
- Similarly, the words העפלה (Aliyah Bet, called the Ha'apala which designates the covert Jewish immigration to British Palestine, 1934–1948) and מעפילים (the immigrants of this immigration), whose respective prescribed pronunciation is /haʕpaˈla/ and /maʕpiˈlim/, are commonly pronounced /ha.apaˈla/ and /ma.apiˈlim/, again replacing the consonant (/ʕ/) with the vowel (/a/), but still preferring the stop /p/ to the fricative /f/.
- Conversely, words like להכחיש (to deny) or מכחול (paintbrush), whose respective prescribed pronunciation is /lehaχˈħiʃ/ and /miχˈħol/, are commonly pronounced /lehakˈχiʃ/ and /mikˈχol/, preferring the stop /k/ to the fricative /χ/, although following vowels (respectively /a/ and /i/), due to the shifting of the original Semitic pronunciation of the letter ח (heth) from /ħ/ to /χ/, rendering it identical to common Israeli pronunciation of the fricative variant of the letter כ.
