= Ktiv menuqad =

Hebrew text supplemented with niqqud diacritics

Ktiv menuqad (Hebrew: כתיב מנוקד IPA: [ktiv menuˈkad], literally "writing with niqqud") is text in Hebrew supplemented with niqqud diacritics. In modern Israeli orthography niqqud is rarely used, except in specialised texts such as dictionaries, poetry, or texts for children or for new immigrants.

An example of ktiv menuqad is a tikkun, a book in which the text of the Torah appears in two side-by-side versions, one identical to the text which appears in the Torah (which uses ktiv haser), and one with niqqud and cantillation.

== See also ==
- Hebrew alphabet
- Academy of the Hebrew Language
- Hebrew spelling
- Ktiv male
- Ktiv haser
