= Hebraization =

Hebraization may refer to:

- Hebraization of Palestinian place names
- Hebraization of surnames
- Hebraization of English
