= Hebrew spelling =

Way words are spelled in the Hebrew language

Hebrew spelling is the way words are spelled in the Hebrew language. The Hebrew alphabet contains 22 letters, all of which are primarily consonants. This is because the Hebrew script is an abjad, that is, its letters indicate consonants, not vowels or syllables. An early system to overcome this, still used today, is matres lectionis, where four of these letters, alef, he, vav and yud also serve as vowel letters. Later, a system of vowel points to indicate vowels (Hebrew diacritics), called niqqud, was developed.

== History ==
Throughout history, there have been two main systems of Hebrew spelling. One is vocalized spelling, the other is unvocalized spelling.

In vocalized spelling (ktiv menuqad), all of the vowels are indicated by vowel points (called niqqud). In unvocalized spelling (ktiv hasar niqqud, or ktiv male), the vowel points are omitted, but can be substituted by other vowels – vav and yud. This system is the spelling system commonly used in Modern Hebrew today.

Vowel points are always optional in Hebrew. They can be used fully, partially or not used at all. The recommended approach endorsed today by the Academy of the Hebrew Language and other Israeli educational institutions is to use plēnē spelling (matres lectionis) when not adding vowel dots (which is the usual case), and place a vocalization sign on a letter only when ambiguity cannot be resolved otherwise. The "defective" spelling is recommended for a fully vocalized text, hence its use is becoming rare. Texts older than 50–60 years may be written in an unvocalized defective spelling (for example, the word ḵamiším "fifty", was written חמשים on banknotes issued in Mandatory Palestine or by the Bank of Israel in its early days. Today, the common spelling is חמישים). A vocalized plene spelling system is common in children's books, when it is better to accustom the children to the more popular plene spelling, while still letting them benefit from the vowel dots as a reading aid in early learning stages.

A third system that was endorsed in the past by the Academy of the Hebrew Language as an optimal system, but abandoned due to low popularity, calls for the use of ḥolám (וֹ), šurúq (וּ), dagéš in Bet, Kaf and Pe (בּ, כּ, פּ vs. ב, כ, פ), Šin Smalít (שׂ) and mappíq (הּ), while abandoning all other vowel dots (in everyday writing). According to this system, matres lectionis are still introduced to mark vowels, but the letter Vav is used only as a consonant, while its variants ḥolám and šurúq serve as vowel letters. This system also makes clear distinction between final He used as a vowel marker (e.g. ילדה /jalˈda/ "a girl" ) and as a consonant (e.g. ילדהּ /jalˈdah/ "her child"). This system was never extensively used, and the Academy of the Hebrew Language finally abandoned it in 1992, when new rules were published not assuming any use of vowel dots.

Unvocalized spelling rules were instituted by the Hebrew Language Committee in 1890 (which became the Academy of the Hebrew Language in 1953) and formally standardised in 1996. Even though the rules are established, some of the rules and specific spellings are disputed by writers and publishers, who often create their own in-house spelling system. Also, because having two spelling systems within the same language is confusing, some would like to reform it. In 2004, Mordechai Mishor, one of the academy's linguists, proposed in a session of the Academy of the Hebrew Language a modest reform.

== Usage today ==
There are three systems of spelling used for Modern Hebrew.

1. Ktiv haser ("missing spelling"): This defective script may be found in the Sefer Torah read in synagogue. It is sometimes considered to be anachronistic in everyday life, although it is still sometimes found in newspapers and published books. This is the original Hebrew spelling. It is called the "missing spelling" because it does not use niqqud.
2. Ktiv menuqad ("dotted spelling" or "vowelized spelling"): This system of spelling is called "vowelized spelling" and "dotted spelling" because unlike "missing spelling," this system shows exactly how the vowels are in addition to using the dots system ("neqqudot"). It is rarely used in everyday life. However, it is used wherever someone wants their writings to be clear and unambiguous, such as children's books, poetry, language instruction for newcomers, or ambiguous or foreign terms. However, it is very cumbersome and inconvenient in everyday life.
3. Ktiv hasar niqqud or Ktiv male ("spelling lacking niqqud" "full spelling"): This is the dominant system of spelling in Israel, personal correspondence, movie subtitles, etc. Ktiv Male is created to be a niqqud-less spelling that uses matres lectionis (consonant that are also used as vowels: alef, he, vav, yud) instead of the vowel pointers.

=== Examples ===
Word			Ktiv haser	Ktiv menuqad	Ktiv male (Ktiv haser niqqud)
English	Transliteration	IPA	Ktiv haser	Ktiv menuqad	Ktiv male (Ktiv haser niqqud)
courage	ometz	/ˈˀomets/	אמץ ^{1}	אֹמֶץ	אומץ
air	avir	/ˀaˈvir/	אויר ^{2}	אֲוִיר	אוויר
distribution	chalukkah	/χaluˈka/	חלקה ^{3}	חֲלֻקָּה	חלוקה
two	shenayim	/ˈʃnajim/	שנים ^{4}	שְׁנַיִם	שניים

To illustrate the problem with ktiv haser:
^{1} spelled the same as אמץ – immetz – /i'mets/ = "he adopted" – אִמֵּץ in ktiv menuqad
^{2} spelled the same as אויר – uyar – /u'jar/ = "he was drawn" – אוּיָר in ktiv menuqad
^{3} spelled the same as חלקה – chelkah – /ħelˈqa/ = "land plot" – חֶלְקַה in ktiv menuqad
^{4} spelled the same as שנים – shanim – /ʃaˈnim/ = "years" – שָׁנִים in ktiv menuqad

== Usage of multiple systems ==
Examples

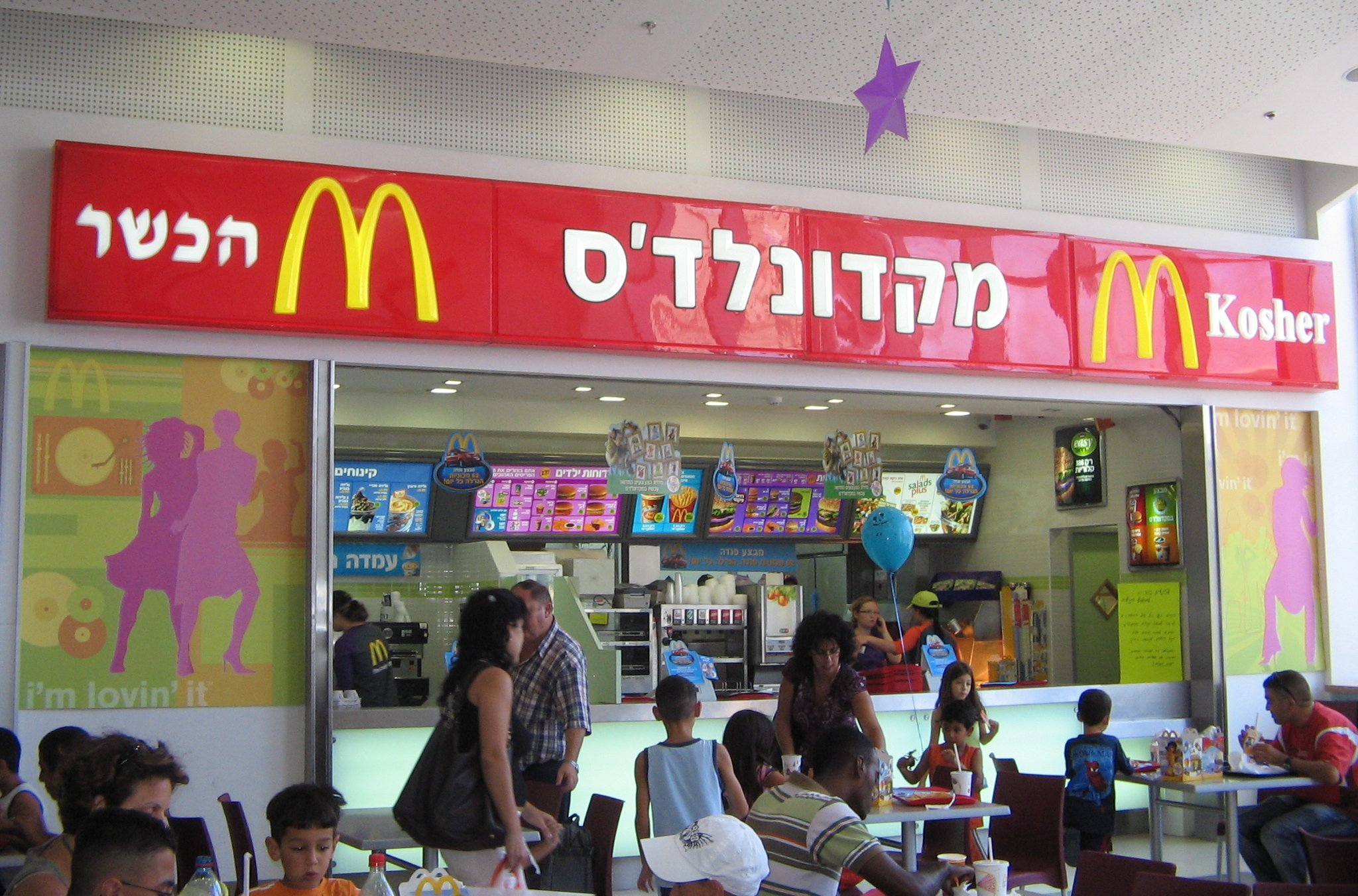
A kosher (הכשר "the Kosher") McDonald's, with the word for kosher spelled without niqqud

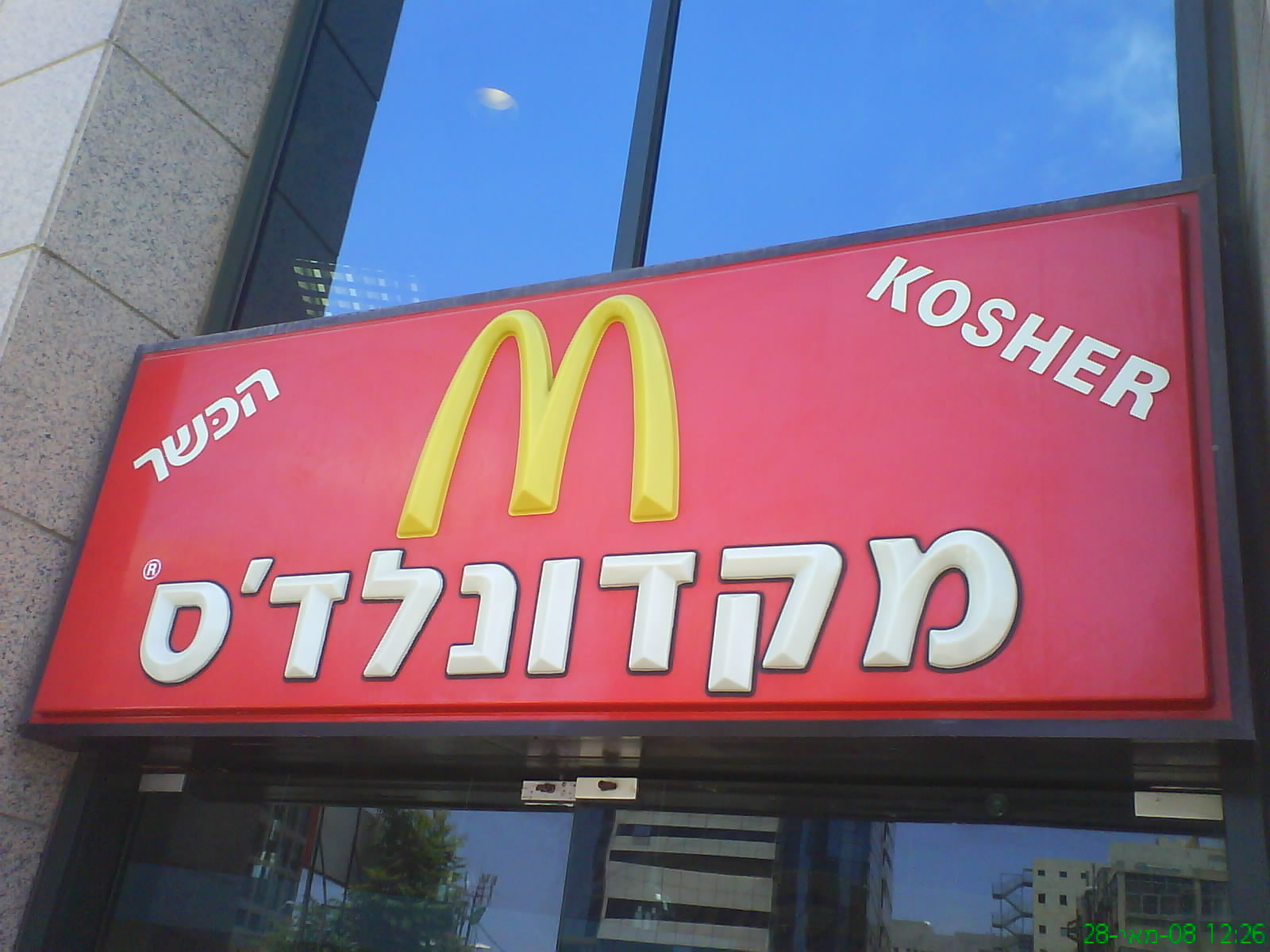
Another kosher (הכּשר "the Kosher") McDonald's, with the word for kosher spelled with partial niqqud to reduce ambiguity

In practice, several spelling systems may co-occur in a single text. Most commonly, a word will be partially marked with niqqud, e.g. אוֹמץ, where only the vav (ו) is vowelized. This clarifies that the vowel is an "o" (וֹ) and not "u" (וּ). In addition, three letters (bet, kaf, and pe; historically six) are pronounced differently depending on whether they have a dot (called a dagesh) in the middle when spelled with niqqud. In full spelling, the dot is absent regardless of the letter's phonetic value. An example in which a mixture of systems would be used is to clarify that a letter should be read with a dagesh. An example of this is shown in the adjacent picture, where for the word kosher (כָּשֵׁר (with niqqud), כשר (full spelling), /kaˈʃer/) may be written as כּשר (a mixture of the two systems) to be unambiguous that it is the letter כּ [k] and not כ [χ]. Words may be written in ktiv haser ("missing spelling") if it is unambiguous and clear enough (ex. חנכה /χanuˈka/ instead of the "full" form חנוכה). In this case, the reader deciphers the word mostly by its context.

Also, some words are almost always written in the "missing" form (ktiv haser) in everyday life: לא (/lo/, no), אמא (/ima/, mother), אם (/im/, if), and כנרת (/kiˈneret/, Kinneret); however, the Academy of the Hebrew Language favors אימא and כינרת, as well as צוהריים and מוחרתיים.

== See also ==
- Hebrew grammar
- Plene scriptum
- Romanization of Hebrew
- Hebraization of English
