= Mater lectionis =

Letters to indicate vowels in some Semitic languages

A mater lectionis (/ˌmeɪtər ˌlɛktiˈoʊnɪs/ MAY-tər LEK-tee-OH-niss, /ˌmɑːtər -/ MAH-tər -; Latin for 'mother of reading', pl. matres lectionis /ˌmɑːtreɪs -/ MAH-trayss -; original Hebrew: אֵם קְרִיאָה, romanized: ʾēm qərîʾāh) is any consonant letter that is used to indicate a vowel, primarily in the writing of Semitic languages such as Arabic, Hebrew and Syriac. The letters that do this in Hebrew are aleph א, he ה, vav ו and yud י, with the latter two in particular being more often vowels than they are consonants. In Arabic, the matres lectionis (though they are much less often referred to thus) are ʾalif ا, wāw و and yāʾ ي.

The original value of the matres lectionis corresponds closely to what are called in modern linguistics glides or semivowels.

== Overview ==
Because the scripts used to write some Semitic languages lack vowel letters, unambiguous reading of a text might be difficult. Therefore, to indicate vowels (mostly long), consonant letters are used. For example, in the Hebrew construct-state form bēt, meaning "the house of", the middle letter י in the spelling בית acts as a vowel, but in the corresponding absolute-state form bayit ("house"), which is spelled the same, the same letter represents a genuine consonant. Matres lectionis are extensively employed only in Hebrew, Aramaic, Syriac and Arabic, but the phenomenon is also found in the Ugaritic, Moabite, South Arabian and Phoenician alphabets.

== Origins and development ==
Historically, the practice of using matres lectionis seems to have originated when /aj/ and /aw/ diphthongs, written with the yod י and the waw ו consonant letters respectively, monophthongized to simple long vowels /eː/ and /oː/. This epiphenomenal association between consonant letters and vowel sounds was then seized upon and used in words without historic diphthongs.

In general terms, it is observable that early Phoenician texts have very few matres lectionis, and that during most of the 1st millennium BCE, Hebrew and Aramaic were quicker to develop matres lectionis than Phoenician. However, in its latest period of development in North Africa (referred to as "Punic"), Phoenician developed a very full use of matres lectionis, including the use of the letter ayin ע, also used for this purpose much later in Yiddish orthography.

In pre-exilic Hebrew, there was a significant development of the use of the letter he ה to indicate word final vowels other than ī and ū. This was probably inspired by the phonological change of the third-person singular possessive suffix from /ahuː/ > /aw/ > /oː/ in most environments. However, in later periods of Hebrew, the orthography was changed so word-final ō was no longer written with ה, except in a few archaically-spelled proper names, such as Solomon שלמה and Shiloh שלה. The difference between the spelling of the third-person singular possessive suffix (as attached to singular nouns) with ה in early Hebrew versus with ו in later Hebrew has become an issue in the authentication of the Jehoash Inscription.

According to Sass (5), already in the Middle Kingdom there were some cases of matres lectionis, i.e. consonant graphemes which were used to transcribe vowels in foreign words, namely in Punic (Jensen 290, Naveh 62), Aramaic, and Hebrew (ה, ו, י; sometimes even aleph א; Naveh 62). Naveh (ibid.) notes that the earliest Aramaic and Hebrew documents already used matres lectionis. Some scholars argue that the Greeks must therefore have borrowed their alphabet from the Arameans. However, the practice has older roots, as the Semitic cuneiform alphabet of Ugarit (13th century BC) already had matres lectionis (Naveh 138).

== Usage in different languages ==
=== Hebrew ===
The earliest method of indicating some vowels in Hebrew writing was to use the consonant letters yod י, waw ו, he ה, and aleph א of the Hebrew alphabet to also write long vowels in some cases. Originally, א and ה were only used as matres lectiones at the end of words, and י and ו were used mainly to write the original diphthongs /aw/ and /aj/ as well as /VjV/ sequences (/j/ surrounded by two vowels, which sometimes simplified to plain long vowels). Gradually, as it was found to be insufficient for differentiating between similar nouns, י and ו were also inserted to mark some long vowels of non-diphthongal origin.

If words can be written with or without matres lectionis, spellings that include the letters are called malē (Hebrew) or plene (Latin), meaning "full", and spellings without them are called ḥaser or defective. In some verb forms, matres lectionis are almost always used. Around the 9th century CE it was decided that the system of matres lectionis did not suffice to indicate the vowels precisely enough for purposes of liturgical recitation of Biblical texts so a supplemental vowel pointing system (niqqud, diacritic symbols indicating vowel pronunciation and other important phonological features not written by the traditional basic consonantal orthography) joined matres lectionis as part of the Hebrew writing system.

In some words in Hebrew, there is a choice of whether to use a mater lectionis or not, and in modern printed texts matres lectionis are sometimes used even for short vowels, which is considered to be grammatically incorrect according to traditional norms, though instances are found as far back as Talmudic times. Such texts from Judaea and Galilee were noticeably more inclined to malē spellings than texts from Babylonia. Similarly, in the Middle Ages, Ashkenazi Jews tended to use malē spellings under the influence of European languages, but Sephardi Jews tended to use ḥaser spellings under the influence of Arabic.

Most commonly, yod י indicates i or e, while waw ו indicates o or u. Aleph א was not systematically developed as a mater lectionis in Hebrew (unlike in Aramaic and Arabic), but it is occasionally used to indicate an a vowel. (However, a silent א, indicating an original glottal stop consonant sound that has become silent in some contexts in Hebrew pronunciation, can occur after almost any vowel.) At the end of a word, he ה can also be used to indicate that the vowel a or e should be pronounced.

Examples:

Symbol	Name	Vowel formation	Vowel quality	Example	
י	Yodh	î, ê, ệ	ī, ē or ǣ	אמיר	Amir
א	Aleph	ê, ệ, ậ, â, ô	mostly ā	פארן	Paran
ו	Waw	ô, û	ō or ū	יואל	Yo'el
ו	Waw	ô, û	ō or ū	ברוך	Baruch
ה	He	ê, ệ, ậ, â, ô	mostly ā or e	לאה	Leah
ה	He	ê, ệ, ậ, â, ô	mostly ā or e	משה	Moshe

=== Arabic ===
In Arabic, there is no choice, and the almost invariable rule is that a long vowel is written with a mater lectionis and a short vowel with a diacritic symbol, but the Uthmanic orthography, the one in which the Quran is traditionally written and printed, has some differences, which are not always consistent. Also, under influence from orthography of European languages, transliterating of vowels in borrowed words into Arabic is usually done using matres lectionis in place of diacritics, even when the vowel transliterated is short or when words from another Semitic language, such as Hebrew, are transliterated. That phenomenon is augmented by the neglect of diacritics in most printed forms since the beginning of mechanical printing.

The name given to the three matres lectionis by traditional Arabic grammar is ḥurūf al-līn wa-l-madd (حروف اللين والمدّ, 'consonants of softness and lengthening'), or ḥurūf al-ʿillah (حروف العلّة, 'causal consonants' or 'consonants of infirmity', because as in Greek grammar, words with 'accidents' were deemed to be afflicted, ill, in opposition to 'healthy' words without accidents).

Informal orthographies of spoken varieties of Arabic also use hāʾ ه to indicate a shorter version of alif ا in final position, a usage augmented by the ambiguity of the use of ه and tāʾ marbūṭah ة in formal Arabic orthography. It is a formal orthography in other languages that use Arabic script, such as Kurdish alphabets.

=== Syriac ===
Syriac-Aramaic vowels are classified into three groups: the alap (ܐ), the waw (ܘ), and the yod (ܝ). The mater lectionis was developed as early as the 6th century to represent long vowels, which were earlier denoted by a dot under the line. The most frequent ones are the yod and the waw, while the alap is mostly restricted to some transliterated words.

=== Mandaic ===
In the Mandaic alphabet, vowels are usually written out in full. The first letter, a (corresponding to alaph), is used to represent a range of open vowels. The sixth letter, wa, is used for close back vowels (u and o), and the tenth letter, ya is used for close front vowels (i and e). These last two can also serve as the consonants w/v and y. The eighth letter corresponds to the Semitic heth, and is called eh; it is pronounced as a long i-vowel but is used only as a suffix for the third person singular. The sixteenth letter, e (Aramaic ayn), usually represents e at the beginning of a word or, when followed by wa or ya, represents initial u or i respectively.

== Influence on other languages ==
Later, in some adaptations of the Arabic alphabet (such those sometimes used for Kurdish and Uyghur) and of the Hebrew alphabet (such as those used for Judeo-Arabic, Yiddish and Judaeo-Spanish), matres lectionis were generally used for all or most vowels, thus in effect becoming vowel letters: see Yiddish orthography. This tendency was taken to its logical conclusion in fully alphabetic scripts such as Greek, Latin, and Cyrillic. Many of the vowel letters in such languages historically go back to matres lectionis in the Phoenician script. For example, the letter ⟨i⟩ was originally derived from the consonant letter yod. Similarly the vowel letters in the Avestan alphabet were adapted from matres lectionis in the version of the Aramaic alphabet adapted as the Pahlavi scripts.

== See also ==
- Hebrew spelling
- Ktiv hasar niqqud
- Mappiq
- Niqqud
- Tiberian vocalization

== Bibliography ==
- Gesenius' Hebrew Grammar, §7
- Canteins, Jean. 1972. Phonèmes et archétypes: contextes autour d'une structure trinitaire; AIU. Paris: G.-P. Maisonneuve et Larose.
- Garr, W. Randall. 1985. Dialect Geography of Syria-Palestine, 1000-586 B.C.E. Philadelphia: University of Pennsylvania Press.
- Jensen, Hans. 1970. Sign Symbol and Script. London: George Allen and Unwin Ltd. Transl. of Die Schrift in Vergangenheit und Gegenwart. VEB Deutscher Verlag der Wissenschaften. 1958, as revised by the author.
- Naveh, Joseph. 1975. Origins of the Alphabet. London: Cassell; translated as Die Entstehung des Alphabets. Zürich und Köln: Benziger, 1979.
- Sass, Benjamin. 1991. Studia Alphabetica. On the origin and early history of the Northwest Semitic, South Semitic and Greek alphabets. CH-Freiburg: Universitätsverlag Freiburg Schweiz. Göttingen: Vandenhoeck & Ruprecht.
