= Emet (truth) =

Emet (אֱמֶת) is a Hebrew word for truth, which "carries the idea of firmness, reliability, faithfulness, and stability" in addition to the meaning of factuality. It can also describe fidelity or trust within relationships.

== Roots (disputed) ==
The root of the word is א-מ-ן, (alef-mem-nun) meaning 'stability'.

The word is spelled א-מ-ת (alef-mem-taw) in Hebrew.

== Spellings in English ==
- Emet
- Emes
- Emeth

== Usage ==
Emet appears in the phrase Baruch dayan emet ("Blessed is the true Judge"), which is traditionally said upon hearing of a death.

=== In Jewish liturgy ===
Emet appears multiple times in Jewish prayer services. Most famously found in the Shema to affirm that hashem's unity and presence are absolutely true.

=== In Yiddish ===
In Yiddish, the word emet carries a connotation of "unvarnished frankness".

== Grouping with other virtues ==
In the Bible and Talmud, emet is often grouped with other virtues, including peace (Zacharia 8:19) and justice (Pirkei Avot).
