= Geresh =

Mark used in Hebrew

Geresh
diacritic, punctuation mark	׳	וכו׳
cantillation mark	֜ or ֝	הָאָ֜רֶץ
compare with apostrophes
'וכו׳', 'הָאָ֜רֶץ'

Geresh (׳ in Hebrew: גֶּרֶשׁ or גֵּרֶשׁ [ˈɡeʁeʃ], or medieval [ˈɡeːɾeːʃ]) is a sign in Hebrew writing. It has two meanings.

1. An apostrophe-like sign (also known colloquially as a chupchik) placed after a letter:
  - as a diacritic that modifies the pronunciation of some letters (only in modern Hebrew),
  - as a diacritic that signifies Yiddish origin of a word or suffix, (examples below)
  - as a punctuation mark to denote initialisms or abbreviations,
  - or to denote a single-digit Hebrew numeral
2. A note of cantillation in the reading of the Torah and other Biblical books, taking the form of a curved diagonal stroke placed above a letter.

== Diacritic ==
As a diacritic, the Geresh is written immediately after (left of) the letter it modifies. It indicates three sounds native to speakers of modern Hebrew that are common in loan words and slang: [dʒ] as in judge, [ʒ] as in measure and [tʃ] as in church. In transliteration of Arabic, it indicates Arabic phonemes which are usually allophones in modern Hebrew: [ɣ] is distinguished from [r] and [ħ] is distinguished from [χ]. Finally, it indicates other sounds foreign to the phonology of modern Hebrew speakers and used exclusively for the transliteration of foreign words: [ð] as in then, [θ] as in thin, [sˤ]; and, in some transliteration systems, also [tˤ], [dˤ] and [ðˤ]. It may be compared to the usage of a following h in various Latin digraphs to form other consonant sounds not supported by the basic Latin alphabet, such as "sh", "th", etc.

=== Loanwords, slang, foreign names and transliterations ===
Loanwords, slang, foreign names, and transliteration of foreign languages
Without Geresh					With Geresh				
Symbol	Name	Translit.	IPA	Example	Symbol	Name	Translit.	IPA	Examples
ג	gimel	g	[ɡ]	gap	ג׳	gimel with a geresh	j (or g)	[dʒ]	Jupiter, George
ז	zayin	z	[z]	zoo	ז׳	zayin with a geresh	g, j	[ʒ]	Jacques, beige, vision
צ	tsadi	ts	[ts]	cats	צ׳	tsadi with a geresh	ch	[tʃ]	chip

=== Transcriptions of Arabic ===
There are six additional letters in the Arabic alphabet. They are Ṯāʾ, Ḫāʾ, Ḏāl, Ḍād, Ẓāʾ, and Ghayn. Also, some letters have different sounds in Arabic phonology and modern Hebrew phonology, such as Jīm.

Distinction when transcribing Arabic
Without Geresh						With Geresh					
Symbol	Name	Translit.	Arabic letter	IPA	Example	Symbol	Name	Arabic letter	IPA	Example	Comments
ג	gimel	g	Egyptian / Yemeni Jīm (ج)	[ɡ]	good	ג׳	gimel with a geresh	Jīm (ج)	[dʒ]	Al-Jazeera (الجزيرة)	Also used with other loan words and transliterations for /dʒ/
ד	dalet	d	Dāl (د)	[d]	door	ד׳	dalet with a geresh	Ḏāl (ذ)	[ð]	Dhu [a]l-Hijjah (ذو الحجة)	Also used for English voiced th; Often a simple Dalet (ד) is written
ח	heth	ẖ / h, ḥ, or h	Ḥaʾ (ح)	[ħ]	Non existent in English, pronounced like an "h" while contracting the pharynx	ח׳	heth with a geresh	Ḫāʾ (ﺥ)	[χ]	Sheikh (شيخ)	
ת	tav	t	Tāʾ (ت)	[t]	tail	ת׳	tav with a geresh	ṯāʾ (ث)	[θ]	ʿuthman (عثمان)	Also used for English voiceless th
ס	samekh	s	Sīn (س)	[s]	sun	ס׳	samekh with a geresh	Ṣad (ص)	[sˤ] pharyngealized [s]; approximate pronunciation by pronouncing a voiceless "s" while constricting the pharynx or the larynx		May also be transcribed with the corresponding Hebrew letter צ
ר	resh	r	Rāʾ (ر)	[r]	French r	ר׳	reish with a geresh	Ghayn (غ)	[ɣ]	Abu Ghosh (أَبُو غوش)	Standard simplified: ר׳ and ע׳; however, ר׳ is proscribed by the Academy of the Hebrew Language. Another precise proscribed transcription is גֿ; in some cases of established usage, a ג with no diacritics is used.
The predominant pronunciation is uvular [ʁ, ʀ], therefore resh is spelled without geresh for that pronunciation. Other accentual variants include an alveolar pronunciation [ɾ, r].						ר׳	reish with a geresh	Ghayn (غ)	[ɣ]	Abu Ghosh (أَبُو غوش)	Standard simplified: ר׳ and ע׳; however, ר׳ is proscribed by the Academy of the Hebrew Language. Another precise proscribed transcription is גֿ; in some cases of established usage, a ג with no diacritics is used.
ע	ayin	’	ʿAyn (ع)	[ʕ] ←→ [ʢ], sometimes [ʡ] or [ʔˤ] Ranges from pharyngeal fricative [ʕ] to epiglottal fricative [ʢ], sometimes an epiglottal stop [ʡ] or a pharyngealized glottal stop [ʔˤ]; approximate pronunciation by constricting the pharynx or the larynx		ע׳	ayin with a geresh	Ghayn (غ)	[ɣ]	Abu Ghosh (أَبُو غوش)	Standard simplified: ר׳ and ע׳; however, ר׳ is proscribed by the Academy of the Hebrew Language. Another precise proscribed transcription is גֿ; in some cases of established usage, a ג with no diacritics is used.

=== Transliteration of foreign names ===
Distinction when transcribing foreign names
Without Geresh					With Geresh				
Symbol	Name	Translit.	IPA	Example	Symbol	Name	Translit.	IPA	Example
ד	dalet	d	[d]	door	ד׳	dalet with a geresh	English voiced th	[ð]	then
ת	tav	t	[t]	tail	ת׳	tav with a geresh	English voiceless th	[θ]	thing
ו	vav	v	[v]	vote	וו or ו׳ (non-standard^{[*]})	vav with a geresh or double vav	w	[w]	William

Note
* Both double-vav and vav with geresh are non-standard and inconsistently used.

=== Yiddish origin ===
Some words or suffixes of Yiddish origin or pronunciation are marked with a geresh, e.g. the diminutive suffix לֶ׳ה – -le, e.g. יענקל׳ה – Yankale (as in Yankale Bodo), or the words חבר׳ה – [ˈχevre], 'guys' (which is the Yiddish pronunciation of Hebrew חבורה [χabuˈra] 'company'), or תכל׳ס – [ˈtaχles], 'in the end' or 'to conclude', from Hebrew תכלית [taχˈlit], 'ending'.

== Punctuation mark ==
The geresh is used as a punctuation mark in initialisms and to denote numerals.

=== Indicating initialisms ===
In initialisms, the Geresh is written after the last letter of the initialism. For example: the title גְּבֶרֶת (literally "lady") is abbreviated גב׳, equivalent to English "Mrs" and "Ms".

=== Denoting a numeral ===
A Geresh can be appended after (left of) a single letter to indicate that the letter represents a Hebrew numeral. For example: ק׳ represents 100. A multi-digit Hebrew numeral is indicated by the Gershayim ⟨״⟩.

== Cantillation mark ==
As a note of cantillation in the reading of the Torah, the Geresh is printed above the accented letter: ב֜. The Geresh Muqdam (lit. 'a Geresh made earlier'), a variant cantillation mark, is also printed above the accented letter, but slightly before (i.e. more to the right of) the position of the normal Geresh: ב֝. As a cantillation mark it is also called Ṭères (טֶרֶס).

== Computer encoding ==
Most keyboards do not have a key for the geresh. As a result, an apostrophe ( ', Unicode U+0027) is often substituted for it.

Appearance	Code points	Name
׳	U+05F3	HEBREW PUNCTUATION GERESH
֜	U+059C	HEBREW ACCENT GERESH
֝	U+059D	HEBREW ACCENT GERESH MUQDAM

== See also ==
- Gershayim
- Hebraization of English
- Hebrew alphabet
- Hebrew numerals
