= Hiriq =

Hebrew niqqud vowel sign

Ḥiriq
ִ
IPA	Hebrew: i Yiddish: ɪ
Transliteration	i
English approximation	Hebrew: ski Yiddish: skip
Ḥiriq Example
נִקּוּד
The word niqqud in Hebrew. The first vowel (under Nun, the dot underneath) is a ḥiriq itself.
Ḥiriq mālē Example
תִּינוֹק
The word "baby" in Hebrew with niqqud. Notice the additional Yud ⟨יִ.⟩
Other Niqqud
Shva · Hiriq · Tzere · Segol · Patach · Kamatz · Holam · Dagesh · Mappiq · Shuruk · Kubutz · Rafe · Sin/Shin Dot

Hiriq, also called Chirik (Hebrew: חִירִיק, romanized: ḥiriq IPA: [χiˈʁik]) is a Hebrew niqqud vowel sign represented by a single dot ⟨ ִ ⟩ underneath the letter. In Modern Hebrew, it indicates the phoneme /i/ which is similar to the "ee" sound in the English word deep and is transliterated with "i". In Yiddish, it indicates the phoneme /ɪ/ which is the same as the "i" sound in the English word skip and is transliterated with "i".

== Spelling ==
When writing with niqqud, the letter yud ⟨י⟩ is often written after the letter that carries the Hiriq sign. This is called ḥiriq mālē (Hebrew: חִירִיק מָלֵא IPA: [χiˈʁik maˈle]), meaning "full" (or "plene") hiriq. In writing without niqqud, the letter yud is added more often as a mater lectionis, than in writing with niqqud, The main exception is the "i" vowel in a syllable that ends with shva naḥ. For example the words סִדְרָה (series) and סִדְּרָה (she organized) are pronounced identically in modern Hebrew, but in spelling without niqqud סִדְרָה is written סדרה because there is a shva naḥ on the letter ד, and סִדְּרָה is written סידרה.

In Yiddish orthography the ḥiriq is placed under the yud ⟨יִ⟩.

== Pronunciation ==
The following table contains the pronunciation and transliteration of the different Hiriqs in reconstructed historical forms and dialects using the International Phonetic Alphabet.

The letter Bet ⟨ב⟩ used in this table is only for demonstration, any letter can be used.

Symbol	Name	Pronunciation						
Symbol	Name	Israeli	Ashkenazi	Sephardi	Yemenite	Tiberian	Reconstructed	
Symbol	Name	Israeli	Ashkenazi	Sephardi	Yemenite	Tiberian	Mishnaic	Biblical
בִ	Hiriq	[i]	[i]	[i, iː]	[i]	[i, iː]	?	[ɪ]
בִי	Ḥiriq mālē (Also called, Ḥiriq Yud)	[i]	[iː]	[iː]	[iː]	[iː]	?	[iː]

== Vowel length comparison ==
These vowels lengths are not manifested in Modern Hebrew. In addition, the short i is usually promoted to a long i in Israeli writing for the sake of disambiguation.

Vowel comparison table
Vowel Length			IPA	Transliteration	English approximation
Long	Short	Very Short	IPA	Transliteration	English approximation
ִ י	ִ	n/a	[i]	i	ski

Yiddish orthography style
Vowel	IPA	Transliteration	English approximation
No length distinction	IPA	Transliteration	English approximation
יִ	[ɪ]	i	skip

Note: In Yiddish orthography only, the glyph, yud-ḥiriq (יִ ), pronounced /i/, can be optionally used, rather than typing yud then ḥiriq (יִ). In Hebrew spelling this would be pronounced /ji/. /i/ is written ḥiriq under the previous letter then yud ( ִ י).

== Computer encoding ==
Glyph	Unicode	Name
ִ	U+05B4	HIRIQ

== See also ==
- Niqqud
- Unicode and HTML for the Hebrew alphabet
