= Plene scriptum =

Word containing a superfluous letter

In orthography, a plene scriptum (Latin for 'fully written') is a word containing an additional letter, usually one which is superfluous – not normally written in that word – nor needed for the proper comprehension of the word. Today, the term applies mostly to sacred scripture.

Examples of plene scripta appear frequently in classical Hebrew texts, and copyists are obliged to copy them unchanged, to ensure that biblical or other sacred texts are written with universal conformity. The expression plene scriptum (יתר, yater, 'excess'), sometimes simply described in Hebrew as מלא (malé, 'full'), is often used in contrast with defective scriptum (חסר, ḥaser, 'deficient'), the latter implying a word in which a letter that is normally present has been omitted. Together, plene and defective scripta are sometimes described using the Hebrew phrase יתר וחסר, yater we-ḥaser.

The original use of the phrase plene scriptum seems to mean Latin characters written without using abbreviations.

== Implications ==
In the Hebrew Bible, in Devarim Deut. 3:21, the name "Joshua" is written in Hebrew in plene scriptum (יהושוע, yhwšw’), as it possesses a superfluous vav, and which word is normally written with only one vav, as in יהושע (yhwš’). Other examples abound of this anomaly, such as the name "Jacob" (יעקוב, y’qwb) in Leviticus 26:42. The Hebrew name "Issachar" (יִשָּׂשכָר), where there is a second letter sin (ש) having no sound, is a classic example of plene scriptum. The word צידה (tsāyiḏ) in Genesis 27:3, where the he at the end of the word has no function, is another example of plene scriptum or else a case of qere and ketiv.

The Babylonian Talmud discusses why the Hebrew Bible in Leviticus 23:42–43 writes for the plural word 'booths' the Hebrew word סֻּכֹּת (in defective scriptum), but in the verse that immediately follows makes use of the plural word in its usual form, סֻּכּוֹת. A biblical word's plene or defective characteristic has often been used in rabbinic hermeneutics to decide Halachic norms. (Note: For an example of rabbinical hermeneutics, see the commentary of Rabbi Yishmael in the Babylonian Talmud (Menahot 34b), regarding the word לטטפת ('frontlets'), in Exod. 13:16, Deut. 6:8, and Deut. 11:18, by which he learned that tefillin are made with four compartments; cf. Sanhedrin 3b–4b on the word קרנת ('horn of the altar'), in Lev. 4:7, 18, and 25, and by which verses the School of Hillel learned how many blood oblations are required as a first resort to be put on the horns of the altar when bringing a sin-offering, and how many are actually indispensable.) The Talmud and the rabbis explain the variations in plene and defective scriptum found in the Torah as being merely a Halacha le-Moshe mi-Sinai (a Law given to Moses at Sinai).

In some Semitic languages (Hebrew, Aramaic and Arabic), paleographers often describe the addition of a plene consonantal letter, such as vav and yud (used in place of the vowels 'o', 'u', 'i', and 'ei'), as employing matres lectionis in its reading, although not all plene letters used in Hebrew words are indeed a mater lectionis.

== Variant readings ==
The ethnographer, Jacob Saphir (1822–1886), in his 19th century work Iben Safir, mentions the tradition of orthography found in the Halleli Codex of the Pentateuch, in which he laid down the most outstanding examples of plene and defective scriptum copied generation after generation by the scribes. The Catalan rabbi and Talmudist, Menachem Meiri (1249 – c. 1310), also brings down an exhaustive list of words in his Kiryat Sefer, showing which words are to be written by scribes in plene scriptum and which words are to be written in defective scriptum, based on the Masoretic Text. Rabbi Jedidiah Norzi (1560–1626) wrote a popular work on Hebrew orthography contained in the Five Books of Moses, and in the five Megillot, with examples of plene and defective writings, which was later named Minḥat Shai.

In the Tikkun Soferim (the model text for copying Torah scrolls by scribes), the word plene is always used in relation to other words written in defective scriptum, not because there is necessarily anything unusual or abnormal about the word being written in such a way, but to ensure a universal layout (conformity) in scribal practices, where one word in a text must be written as though it were lacking in matres lectionis, and another word in a different text (sometimes even the same word) appearing as though it was not.

Among Israel's diverse ethnic groups, variant readings have developed over certain words in the Torah, the Sephardic tradition calls for the word ויהיו (wyhyw) in the verse ויהיו כל ימי נח (Genesis 9:29) to be written in defective scriptum (i.e. ויהי, wyhy), but the Yemenite Jewish community requiring it to be written in plene scriptum (i.e. ויהיו). The word mineso in גדול עוני מנשוא (Genesis 4:13) is written in Sephardic Torah scrolls in plene scriptum, with an additional 'waw', but in Yemenite Torah scrolls, the same word mineso is written in defective scriptum, without a 'waw' (i.e. מנשא, mnsʾ).

== Other uses ==
The ancient Roman meaning of the phrase plene scriptum may have simply meant Latin characters written without using abbreviations.

The word plene has also come to denote the horizontal bar or line written above the six double-sounding consonants in ancient Hebrew codices, whenever their assigned reading is to be read without a dagesh, or as a non-accentuated Hebrew character. These letters are the bet (ב), gimel (ג), dalet (ד), kaph (כ), pe (פ), and tau (ת). When the accentuation dot appears in the middle of these Hebrew characters, there is no plene bar written above them.

== See also ==
- Mater lectionis
- Hebrew spelling
- Latin phrases
- Parashah
- Qere and Ketiv
- Ktiv hasar niqqud
