= Ktiv hasar niqqud =

Hebrew spelling without indicating vowels via diacritic marks (niqqudot)

Ktiv hasar niqqud (Hebrew pronunciation: [ktiv χaˈsaʁ niˈkud]; Hebrew: כתיב חסר ניקוד, literally "spelling lacking niqqud"), colloquially known as ktiv maleh (IPA: [ktiv maˈle]; כתיב מלא, literally "full spelling"), are the rules for writing Hebrew without vowel points (niqqud), often replacing them with matres lectionis (ו and י). To avoid confusion, consonantal ו ([v]) and י ([j]) are doubled in the middle of words. In general use, niqqud are rarely used, except in specialized texts such as dictionaries, poetry, or texts for children or for new immigrants.

== Comparison example ==
From a Hebrew translation of "The Raven" by Edgar Allan Poe (translated by Eliyahu Tsifer):

Ktiv male

וילון של משי ארגמן, ספק רשרוש, מסך מוכמן,
הפחידוני, ביעתוני, חששות אימה וסלוד,
פעמי לבי מקבת, במאוץ וגם בשבת,
האושפיז בשוט ושבט, את דלתי הזיז במנוד,
את דלתי הזיז הניע, קטב לשכתי ישוד,
אלמוני הוא האורח, אלמוני הוא ולא עוד!

שלוותי פרשה כנפיים, היסוסיי אפסו אפיים,
אדון וגברת, בכנות אפציר אסגוד,
כן עובדה היא, שעת גלוש, וברוך ידך תקוש,
מדורי אזי נלוש, עת הנדת שדוד,
לרווחה דלתי פרשתי, כי נועדתי לשרוד,
ושור! הבט! רק שחור, לא עוד!

With niqqud

וִילוֹן שֶׁל מֶשִׁי אַרְגָּמָן, סָפֵק רִשְׁרוּשׁ, מָסָךְ מֻכְמָן,
הִפְחִידֻנִּי, בִּעֲתֻנִי, חֲשָׁשוֹת אֵימָה וּסְלוֹד,
פַּעֲמֵי לִבִּי מַקֶּבֶת, בִּמְאוֹץ וְגַם בְּשֶׁבֶת,
הָאֻשְׁפִּיז בְּשׁוֹט וָשֵׁבֶט, אֶת דַּלְתִּי הֵזִיז בִּמְנֹד,
אֶת דַלְתִּי הֵזִיז הֵנִיעַ, קֶטֶב לִשְׁכַּתִּי יָשׁוֹד,
אַלְמוֹנִי הוּא הָאוֹרֵחַ, אַלְמוֹנִי הוּא וְלֹא עוֹד!

שַׁלְוַתִּי פַּרְשָׂה כְּנָפַיִם, הִסּוּסַי אָפְסוּ אַפַּיִם,
אָדוֹן וּגְבֶרֶת, בְּכֵנוּת אָפְצִיר אֶסְגֹּד,
כֵּן עֻבְדָּה הִיא, שְׁעַת גְּלֹש, וּבְרוֹךְ יָדְךָ תַּקֹּשׁ,
מְדוֹרִי אֲזַי נַלֹּשׁ, עֵת הֵנַדְתָּ שָׁדֹד,
לִרְוָחָה דַּלְתִּי פָּרַשְׂתִּי, כִּי נוֹעַדְתִּי לִשְׂרֹד,
וְשּׁוּר! הַבֵּט! רַק שְׁחוֹר, לֹא עוֹד!

Added letters highlighted and respective phonemes
viˈlon ʃel ˈmeʃi ʔarɡaˈman, saˈfek riʃˈruʃ, maˈsaχ muχˈman	וילון של משי ארגמן, ספק רשרוש, מסך מוכמן,
hifħiˈduni, biʕaˈtuni, ħaʃaˈʃot ʔejˈma ʔuˈslod	הפחידוני, ביעתוני, חששות אימה וסלוד,
paʕaˈmej liˈbi maˈkevet, bimˈʔots veˈɡam beˈʃevet,	פעמי לבי מקבת, במאוץ וגם בשבת,
haʔuʃˈpiz beˈʃot vaˈʃevet, ʔet dalˈti heˈziz bimˈnod,	האושפיז בשוט ושבט, את דלתי הזיז במנוד,
ʔet dalˈti heˈziz heˈniaʕ, ˈketev liʃkaˈti jaˈʃod,	את דלתי הזיז הניע, קטב לשכתי ישוד,
ʔalmoˈni hu haʔoˈreaħ, ʔalmoˈni hu velo ʕod	אלמוני הוא האורח, אלמוני הוא ולא עוד!
ʃalvaˈti parˈsa knaˈfajim, hisuˈsaj ʔafˈsu ʔaˈpajim,	שלוותי פרשה כנפיים, היסוסי אפסו אפיים,
ʔaˈdon uɡˈveret, beχeˈnut ʔafˈtsir ʔesˈɡod,	אדון וגברת, בכנות אפציר אסגוד,
ken ʕuvˈda hi, ʃʕat ɡloʃ, uveˈroχ jadˈχa taˈkoʃ,	כן עובדה היא, שעת גלוש, וברוך ידך תקוש,
medoˈri aˈzaj naˈloʃ, ʕet heˈnadeta ˈʃadod,	מדורי אזי נלוש, עת הנדת שדוד,
lirvaˈħa dalˈti paˈrasti, ki noˈʕadeti lisˈrod,	לרווחה דלתי פרשתי, כי נועדתי לשרוד,
veˈʃur, haˈbet, rak ʃħor, lo ʕod	ושור! הבט! רק שחור, לא עוד!
Note: In Modern Hebrew, the letter ח is commonly pronounced [χ] (not [ħ]), and the letter ע is [ʔ] (not [ʕ]) if at all; i.e., often neither א nor ע is pronounced. The consonants /ħ/ and /ʕ/ are pronounced daily only dialectally; sometimes however they are also pronounced in festive or theatrical contexts: in poetry readings, where a more distinct articulation than usual of the א as /ʔ/ would be common; thus the proposed transcription could be representative of a literary reading of this text, not representative of everyday Israeli speech. Similarly, the consonantal י in the dual forms כנפיים /knaˈfajim/ and אפיים /ʔaˈpajim/ is distinctly pronounced [j] only dialectically or in festive or theatrical contexts and is otherwise not pronounced, resulting in the hiatus /ˈa.i/.

== Historical examination ==
=== Ktiv haser ===
Ktiv haser (כתיב חסר) is writing whose consonants match those generally used in voweled text, but without the actual niqqud. For example, the words שֻׁלְחָן and דִּבֵּר written in ktiv haser are שלחן and דבר. In voweled text, the niqqud indicate the correct vowels, but when the niqqud is missing, the text is difficult to read, and the reader must make use of the context of each word to know the correct reading.

A typical example of a Hebrew text written in ktiv haser is the Torah, read in synagogues (simply called the Torah reading). For assistance, readers often use a Tikkun, a book where the text of the Torah appears in two side-by-side versions, one identical to the text which appears in the Torah, and one with niqqud and cantillation.

=== Ktiv male ===
Due to the difficulty of reading unvoweled text, the Va'ad ha-lashon introduced the Rules for the Spelling-Without-Niqqud (כללי הכתיב חסר הניקוד), which in reality dictates ktiv male. This system mostly involved the addition of ו and י to mark the different vowels. Later on, these rules were adopted by the Academy of the Hebrew Language, which continued to revise them, and they were mostly accepted by the public, mainly for official writing.

Ktiv haser became obsolete in Modern Hebrew, and ktiv male has already been dominant for decades in unvoweled texts: all of the newspapers and books published in Hebrew are written in ktiv male. Additionally, it is common for children's books or texts for those with special needs to contain niqqud, but ktiv haser without niqqud is rare.

Despite the Academy's standardization of the rules for ktiv male, there is a substantial absence of unity in writing, partly because of a lack of grammatical knowledge, partly because of the historical layers of the language, and partly because of a number of linguistic categories in which the Academy's decisions are not popular. As a result, book publishers and newspaper editors make their own judgments.

== Rules for spelling without niqqud ==
As is the norm for linguistic rules, the rules for spelling without niqqud are not entirely static. Changes occur from time to time, based on amassed experience. For example, originally the rules for spelling without niqqud dictated that אשה isha ("woman") should be written without a yod י (to distinguish it from אישה ishah – "her husband"), but currently the exception has been removed, and now, the Academy prefers אישה. The last substantial change to the rules for spelling without niqqud was made in 1993 updated in 1996. The following is the summary of the current rules:

- Every letter that appears in unvoweled text also appears in voweled text.
- After a letter voweled with a kubuts (the vowel /u/), the letter waw ו appears: קופסה, הופל, כולם (kufsa, hupal, kulam).
- After a letter voweled with a holam haser (the vowel /o/) the letter waw ו appears: בוקר, ישמור (boker, yishmor).
- After a letter voweled with a hirik haser (the vowel /i/) the letter yod י appears: דיבור, יישוב, תעשייה (dibur, yishuv, ta'asiya). The letter yod י does not appear in the following situations:
  - Before a shva nah, for example: הרגיש, מנהג, דמיון (hirgish, minhag, dimyon);
  - Words whose base forms do not contain the vowel /i/: ליבי, איתך, עיתים (livi, itkha/itakh, itim), which are inflected forms of לב, את, עת; (lev, et, et), respectively
  - After affix letters, like in מביתו, מיד (mi-beto, mi-yad), and also in the words: עם im, הנה hine
  - Before יו (/ju/ or /jo/): דיון, קיום, בריות, נטיות (diyun, kiyum, briyot, netiyot).
- After a letter voweled with a tsere (the vowel /e/) the letter yod י generally does not appear: ממד (=מֵמַד), אזור (=אֵזוֹר) (memad, ezor), but there are situations when yod י does appear: תיבה, הישג (teva, heseg) and in words in which tsere replaces hirik because of the presence of a guttural letter (אהחע״ר): תיאבון, תיאבד (te'avon, teaved).
- Consonantal vav ו (the consonant /v/) is doubled in the middle of a word: תקווה, זווית (tikva, zavit). The letter is not doubled at the beginning or the end of a word: ורוד, ותיק, צו (varod, vatik, tzav). Initial vav ו is doubled when an affix letter is added except for the affix ו- (meaning "and-"). Thus from the word ורוד varod one has הוורוד ha-varod but וורוד u-varod.
- Consonantal yod י (the consonant /j/) is doubled in the middle of a word, for example: בניין, הייתה (binyan, hayta). The letter is not doubled at the beginning of a word or after affix letters: ילד, יצא, הילד (yeled, yatza, ha-yeled). Still, consonantal yod י is not doubled in the middle of a word where it appears before or after a mater lectionis: פרויקט, מסוים, ראיה, הפניה, בעיה (proyekt, mesuyam, re'aya, hafnaya/hapniya, be'aya).

These are the most basic rules. Each one has exceptions which are described in the handbook "כללי הכתיב חסר הניקוד" (spelling rules without niqqud) that the Academy publishes in Hebrew.

=== Notes ===
- When a reader is likely to err in the reading of a word, the use of partial vowelling is recommended: מִנהל minhal (to distinguish it from מנַהל menahel).
- While the rules above apply to the writing of native Hebrew words, they are not used for spelling given names, which are frequently written in ktiv haser rather than ktiv male: שלמה, יעקב, כהן (Shlomo, Ya'akov, Kohen).

== See also ==
- Hebrew alphabet
