= Defective script =

Writing system which does not represent all sounds of a language

In graphemics, a defective script is a writing system that does not represent all the phonemic distinctions of a language. This means that the concept is always relative to a given language. Taking the Latin alphabet used in Italian orthography as an example, the Italian language has seven vowels, but the alphabet has only five vowel letters to represent them; in general, the difference between the phonemes close /e, o/ and open /ɛ, ɔ/ is simply ignored, though stress marks, if used, may distinguish them. Among the Italian consonants, both /s/ and /z/ are written ⟨s⟩, and both /t͡s/ and /d͡z/ are written ⟨z⟩; stress and hiatus are also not reliably distinguished.

== Ancient examples of defective script ==
Such shortcomings are not uncommon. The Greek alphabet was defective during its early history. Ancient Greek had distinctive vowel length: five short vowels, /i e a o u/, and seven long vowels, /iː eː ɛː aː ɔː oː uː/. When the Phoenician alphabet was adapted to Greek, the names of five letters were pronounced by the Greeks with initial consonants made silent, and were then used acrophonically to represent vowels. These were alpha, e (later called e psilon), iota, o (later called o micron), and u (later called u psilon) – <α, ε, ι, ο, υ> – five letters for twelve vowel sounds. (The lost initial consonants were /ʔ, h, j, ʕ, w/.) Later the [h] (from /ħ/) dropped out from the Eastern Greek dialects, and the letter heta (now pronounced eta) became available; it was used for /ɛː/. About the same time, the Greeks created an additional letter, o mega, probably by writing o micron with an underline, that was used for /ɔː/. Digraphs <ει> and <ου>, no longer pronounced as diphthongs /ej/ and /ow/, were adopted for /eː/ and /oː/. Thus, Greek entered its classical era with seven letters and two digraphs – <α, ε, ι, ο, υ, η, ω, ει, ου> – for twelve vowel sounds. Long /iː aː uː/ were never distinguished from short /i a u/, even though the distinction was meaningful. Although the Greek alphabet was a good match to the consonants of the language, it was defective when it came to some vowels.

Other ancient scripts were also defective. Egyptian hieroglyphs had no vowel representation at all, while the cuneiform script frequently did not distinguish among a consonant triad like /t/, /d/ and /t'/ (emphatic /t/), or between the vowels /e/ and /i/.

With only 16 characters, the Younger Futhark was an even more defective form of the Elder Futhark, from which it had evolved by the 9th century, after a "transitional period" during the 7th and 8th centuries. At the same time, phonetic changes that led to a greater number of different phonemes in the spoken language, when Proto-Norse evolved into Old Norse. As an example, the Younger Futhark no longer had separate signs for voiced stops and voiceless stops, so a rune like Týr (ᛏ) could represent all of /d/, /t/, /nd/ or /nt/.

== Modern examples of defective script ==
Languages with a long literary history have a tendency to freeze spelling at an early stage, leaving subsequent pronunciation shifts unrecorded. Such is the case with English, French, Greek, Hebrew, and Thai, among others. By contrast, some writing systems have been periodically respelled in accordance with changed pronunciation, such as Dutch, Portuguese, Spanish, Irish, and Japanese hiragana. Note that all of these languages indeed have long literary histories but have simply evolved where others did not.

=== Non-Latin scripts ===
A broadly defective script is the Arabic abjad. The modern script does not normally write short vowels or geminate (double) consonants, and for the first few centuries of the Islamic era, long ā was also not consistently written and many consonant letters were ambiguous as well. The Arabic script derives from the Aramaic, and not only did the Aramaic language have fewer phonemes than Arabic, but several originally distinct Aramaic letters had conflated (become indistinguishable in shape), so that in the early Arabic writings, 28 consonant phonemes were represented by only 18 letters—and in the middle of words, only 15 were distinct. For example, medial ⟨ـٮـ⟩ represented /b, t, θ, n, j/, and ⟨ح⟩ represented /d͡ʒ, ħ, x/. A system of diacritic marks, or pointing, was later developed to resolve the ambiguities and over the centuries became nearly universal. However, even today, unpointed texts of a style called mašq are found, wherein these consonants are not distinguished.

Without short vowels or geminate consonants being written, modern Arabic script نظر nẓr could represent نَظَرَ /naðˤara/ 'he saw', نَظَّرَ /naðˤːara/ 'he compared', نُظِرَ /nuðˤira/ 'he was seen', نُظِّرَ /nuðˤːira/ 'he was compared', نَظَر /naðˤar/ 'a glance', or نِظْر /niðˤr/ 'similar'. However, in practice there is little ambiguity, as the vowels are more easily predictable in Arabic than they are in a language like English. Moreover, the defective nature of the script has its benefits: the stable shape of the root words, despite grammatical inflection, results in quicker word recognition and therefore faster reading speeds; and the lack of short vowels, the sounds which vary the most between Arabic dialects, makes texts more widely accessible to a diverse audience. Non-native speakers learning Arabic or Persian, however, do suffer difficulties in acquiring correct pronunciation from undermarked pedagogical material.

Further, in mašq and those styles of kufic writing which lack consonant pointing, the ambiguities are more serious, for here different roots are written the same. ٮطر could represent the root nẓr 'see' as above, but also nṭr 'protect', bṭr 'pride', bẓr 'clitoris' or 'with flint', as well as several inflections and derivations of each of these root words.

The Arabic alphabet has been adopted by many Muslim peoples to write their languages. In them, new consonant letters have been devised for sounds lacking in Arabic (e.g. /p/, /g/, /t͡ʃ/, and /ʒ/ in Persian; and all the aspirate and retroflex stops in Sindhi). But rarely have the full set of vowels been represented in those new alphabets: Ottoman Turkish had eight vowels but used only three letters to notate them. However, some adaptions of the Arabic alphabet do unambiguously and compulsorily mark all vowels: among them, those for Bosnian, Kashmiri, Kyrgyz, Mandarin, Sorani, and Uyghur.

When a defective script is written with diacritics or other conventions to indicate all phonemic distinctions, the result is called plene writing.

=== Latin script ===
Some otherwise phonemic orthographies based on the Latin script are slightly defective:

- Malay (incl. Malaysian and Indonesian, where /e/ and /ə/ are written as <e>).
- Italian does not distinguish open-mid and close-mid vowels in stressed syllables; /s/ and /z/; /ts/ and /dz/.
- Maltese and Welsh do not distinguish most vowel length.
- Kazakh
- Lithuanian and Serbo-Croatian do not distinguish tone and vowel length (also additional vowels for Lithuanian).
- Latvian does not distinguish tone and some of its vowels.
- Somali does not distinguish vowel phonation and tone.

== Stenography systems ==
Stenography systems are normally defective writing systems, omitting redundant information for the sake of writing speed. Pitman shorthand, for instance, can be written while distinguishing only three vowel symbolizations for the first vowel of a word (high vowel, mid vowel, or low vowel), though there are optional diacritical methods for distinguishing more vowel qualities. Taylor shorthand, which was widely used in the first half of the 19th century, does not distinguish any vowels at all – there is just a dot when a word begins or ends with any vowel.

== Considerations ==
Defectiveness is a cline: the Semitic abjads do not indicate all vowels, but there are also alphabets which mark vowels but not tone (e.g. many African languages), or vowel quality but not vowel length (e.g. Latin). Even if English orthography were regularized, the English alphabet would still be incapable of unambiguously conveying intonation; since this is not expected of scripts, it is not normally counted as defectiveness.

== See also ==
- Phonemic orthography – Orthography in which there is an exact one-to-one correspondence between the graphemes and the phonemes of the language
