= Niqqud =

System of diacritical signs for Hebrew

ְ ֱ ֲ ֳ ִ
ֵ ֶ ַ ָ ֹ
ֻ ּ ֿ ׁ ׂ
Other diacritics	cantillation, geresh, gershayim
- Example
- Gen. 1:9, "And God said, Let the waters be collected". Letters in black, niqqud in red, cantillation in blue
- Niqqud articles
- Shva · Hiriq · Zeire · Segol · Patach · Kamatz · Holam · Dagesh · Mappiq · Shuruk · Kubutz · Rafe · Sin/Shin dot

In Hebrew orthography, niqqud or nikud (Hebrew: נִקּוּד, Modern: nikúd, Tiberian: niqqūḏ, 'dotting, pointing' or נְקֻדּוֹת, Modern: nekudót, Tiberian: nəquddōṯ, 'dots') is a system of diacritical signs used to represent vowels or distinguish between alternative pronunciations of letters of the Hebrew alphabet. Several such diacritical systems were developed in the Early Middle Ages. The most widespread system, and the only one still used to a significant degree today, was created by the Masoretes of Tiberias in the second half of the first millennium AD in the Land of Israel (see Masoretic Text, Tiberian Hebrew). Text written with niqqud is called ktiv menuqad.

Niqqud marks are small compared to the letters, so they can be added without retranscribing texts whose writers did not anticipate them.

In modern Israeli orthography, niqqud is mainly used in specialised texts such as dictionaries, poetry, or texts for children or new immigrants to Israel. For purposes of disambiguation, a system of spelling without niqqud, known in Hebrew as ktiv maleh (כְּתִיב מָלֵא, literally "full spelling"). This was formally standardised in the Rules for Spelling without Niqqud (כְּלָלֵי הַכְּתִיב חֲסַר הַנִּקּוּד) enacted by the Academy of the Hebrew Language in 1996, and updated in 2017. Nevertheless, niqqud is still used occasionally in texts to prevent ambiguity and mispronunciation of specific words.

One reason for the lesser use of niqqud is that it no longer reflects the current pronunciation. In modern Hebrew, tzere is pronounced the same as segol, although they were distinct in Tiberian Hebrew, and pataḥ the same as qamatz. To the younger generation of native Hebrew speakers, these distinctions seem arbitrary and meaningless; on the other hand, Hebrew language purists have rejected out of hand the idea of changing the basics of niqqud and fitting them to the current pronunciation – with the result that in practice niqqud is increasingly going out of use.

According to Ghil'ad Zuckermann, the lack of niqqud in what he calls "Israeli" (Modern Hebrew) often results in "mispronunciations". For example, the Israeli lexical item מתאבנים is often pronounced as mitabním (literally "becoming fossilized (masculine plural)") instead of metaavním "appetizers", the latter deriving from תאבון teavón "appetite", the former deriving from אבן éven "stone". Another example is the toponym מעלה אדומים, which is often pronounced as maalé edomím instead of maalé adumím, the latter appearing in the Hebrew Bible (Joshua 15:7 and 18:17). The hypercorrect yotvetá is used instead of yotváta for the toponym יטבתה, mentioned in Deuteronomy 10:7. The surname of American actress Farrah Fawcett (פארה פוסט) is often pronounced fost instead of fóset by many Israelis.

== Chart ==
This table uses the consonant letters ב, ח or ש, where appropriate, to demonstrate where the niqqud is placed in relation to the consonant it is pronounced after. Any other letters shown are actually part of the vowel. Note that there is some variation across traditions in exactly how certain vowel points are pronounced. The table below shows how most Israelis would pronounce them, but the classic Ashkenazi Hebrew, for example, differs in several respects.

Note concerning IPA: the transcription symbols are linked to the articles about the sounds they represent. The diacritic ˘ (breve) indicates a short vowel; the triangular colon symbol ː indicates that the vowel is long.

Symbol	Common name	Alternative names	Type	Scientific name	Hebrew	IPA	Transliteration	Comments
בְ	Shva	sh'va sheva	Israeli	šva	שְׁוָא	[e̞] or Ø	ə, e, ', or nothing	In modern Hebrew, shva represents either /e/ or Ø, regardless of its traditional classification as shva naḥ (Hebrew: שווא נח) or shva naʿ (Hebrew: שווא נע). Examples: Niqqud / Shva denoting the vowel /e/ / Shva denoting Ø (absence of a vowel); shva naḥ / קִמַּטְתְּ [kiˈmate̞t]; הִתְמוֹטַטְתְּ [hitmo̞ˈtate̞t] / קִפַּלְתְּ [kiˈpalt]; הִתְקַפַּלְתְּ [hitkaˈpalt]; shva naʿ / שָׁדְדוּ [ʃade̞ˈdu]; לְאַט [le̞ʾˈat] / שָׂרְדוּ [sarˈdu]; זְמַן [zman]
בְ	Shva	sh'va sheva	Tiberian	šəwāʾ	שְׁוָא	[ă]; [ɛ̆]; [ĕ]; [ĭ]; [ɔ̆]; [ŏ]; [ŭ]		In modern Hebrew, shva represents either /e/ or Ø, regardless of its traditional classification as shva naḥ (Hebrew: שווא נח) or shva naʿ (Hebrew: שווא נע). Examples: Niqqud / Shva denoting the vowel /e/ / Shva denoting Ø (absence of a vowel); shva naḥ / קִמַּטְתְּ [kiˈmate̞t]; הִתְמוֹטַטְתְּ [hitmo̞ˈtate̞t] / קִפַּלְתְּ [kiˈpalt]; הִתְקַפַּלְתְּ [hitkaˈpalt]; shva naʿ / שָׁדְדוּ [ʃade̞ˈdu]; לְאַט [le̞ʾˈat] / שָׂרְדוּ [sarˈdu]; זְמַן [zman]
חֱ	Reduced segol	hataf segol	Israeli	χataf segol	חֲטַף סֶגּוֹל	[e̞]	e or é	
חֱ	Reduced segol	hataf segol	Tiberian	ḥăṭep̄ səgōl	חֲטֶף סְגוֹל	[ɛ̆]	ĕ	
חֲ	Reduced patach	hataf patah hataf patach	Israeli	χataf pataχ	חֲטַף פַּתָּח	[a]	a or á	
חֲ	Reduced patach	hataf patah hataf patach	Tiberian	ḥăṭep̄ páṯaḥ	חֲטֶף פַּתַח	[ă]	ă	
חֳ	Reduced kamatz	hataf kamats hataf kamatz	Israeli	χataf qamats	חֲטַף קָמָץ	[o̞]	ŏ	
חֳ	Reduced kamatz	hataf kamats hataf kamatz	Tiberian	ḥăṭep̄ qāmeṣ	חֲטֶף קָמֶץ	[ɔ̆]	ŏ	
בִ	Hiriq	chirik	Israeli	χiʁiq	חִירִיק	[i]	ī	Usually promoted to Hiriq Malei in Israeli writing for the sake of disambiguation.
בִ	Hiriq	chirik	Tiberian	ḥīreq	חִירֶק	[i] or [iː]	ī	
בִי	Hiriq malei	hiriq yod	Israeli	χiʁiq male	חִירִיק מָלֵא	[i]	ī	
בִי	Hiriq malei	hiriq yod	Tiberian	ḥīreq mālēʾ	חִירֶק מָלֵא	[iː]	ī	
בֵ	Tsere	tzeirei	Israeli	tseʁe	צֵירֵי	[e̞]	e	
בֵ	Tsere	tzeirei	Tiberian	ṣērē	צֵרי	[eː]	ē	
בֵי, בֵה, בֵא	Tsere malei	tsere yod tzeirei yod	Israeli	tseʁe male	צֵירֵי מָלֵא	[e̞]	ē	More commonly ei (IPA [ei̯]).
בֵי, בֵה, בֵא	Tsere malei	tsere yod tzeirei yod	Tiberian	ṣērē mālēʾ	צֵרֵי מָלֵא	[eː]	ē	
בֶ	Segol	segol	Israeli	segol	סֶגּוֹל	[e̞]	e	
בֶ	Segol	segol	Tiberian	səḡōl	סְגוֹל	[ɛ] or [ɛː]	e or é	
בֶי, בֶה, בֶא	Segol malei	segol yod	Israeli	segol male	סֶגּוֹל מָלֵא	[e̞]	e	With succeeding yod, it is more commonly ei (IPA [ei̯]).
בֶי, בֶה, בֶא	Segol malei	segol yod	Tiberian	səḡōl mālēʾ	סְגוֹל מָלֵא	[ɛː]	ệ	
בַ	Patach	patah	Israeli	pataχ	פַּתָּח	[a]	a	A patach on the letters ח, ע, ה at the end of a word is sounded before the letter, and not after. Thus, נֹחַ (Noah) is pronounced /ˈno.ax/. This only occurs at the ends of words and only with patach and ח, ע, and הּ (that is, ה with a dot (mappiq) in it). This is sometimes called a patah ganuv (פַּתָּח גָּנוּב), or "stolen" patach (more formally, "furtive patach"), since the sound "steals" an imaginary epenthetic consonant to make the extra syllable.
בַ	Patach	patah	Tiberian	páṯaḥ	פַּתַח	[a] or [aː]	a or á	
בַה, בַא	Patach malei	patah-he	Israeli	pataχ male	פַּתָּח מָלֵא	[a]	a	
בַה, בַא	Patach malei	patah-he	Tiberian	páṯaḥ mālēʾ	פַּתַח מָלֵא	[aː]	a	
בָ	Kamatz gadol	kamats	Israeli	qamaṣ gadōl	קָמָץ גָּדוֹל	[a]	a	
בָ	Kamatz gadol	kamats	Tiberian	qāmeṣ gāḏōl	קָמֶץ גָּדוֹל	[ɔː]	ā	
בָה, בָא	Kamatz malei	kamatz-he kamats-he	Israeli	qamats male	קָמָץ מָלֵא	[a]	a	
בָה, בָא	Kamatz malei	kamatz-he kamats-he	Tiberian	qāmeṣ mālēʾ	קָמֶץ מָלֵא	[ɔː]	â	
בׇ	Kamatz katan	kamats hatuf	Israeli	qamats qatan	קָמָץ קָטָן	[o̞]	o	Usually promoted to holam malei in Israeli writing to disambiguate. Not to be confused with Hataf Kamatz.
בׇ	Kamatz katan	kamats hatuf	Tiberian	qāmeṣ qāṭān	קָמֶץ קָטָן	[ɔ]	o	
בֹ	Holam	cholam	Israeli	χolam	חוֹלָם	[o̞]	o	Usually promoted to holam malei in Israeli writing to disambiguate. The holam is written above the consonant in the left corner, or slightly to the left of it (i.e., after it) at the top.
בֹ	Holam	cholam	Tiberian	ḥōlem	חֹלֶם	[oː]	ō	
בוֹ, בֹה, בֹא	Holam malei	holam male cholam malei cholam male	Israeli	χolam male	חוֹלָם מָלֵא	[o̞]	ō	The holam is written in the normal position relative to the main consonant (above and slightly to the left), which places it directly over the vav.
בוֹ, בֹה, בֹא	Holam malei	holam male cholam malei cholam male	Tiberian	ḥōlem mālēʾ	חֹלֶם מָלֵא	[oː]	ō	
בֻ	Kubutz	kubuts shuruk (Ashkenazi)	Israeli	qubuts	קֻבּוּץ	[u]	u	Usually promoted to Shuruk in Israeli writing for disambiguation.
בֻ	Kubutz	kubuts shuruk (Ashkenazi)	Tiberian	qibbūṣ	קִבּוּץ	[u] or [uː]	u or ú	
בוּ, בוּה, בוּא	Shuruk	melopum (Ashkenazi)	Israeli	šuʁuq	שׁוּרוּק	[u]	ū	The shuruk is written after the consonant it applies to (the consonant after which the vowel /u/ is pronounced). The dot in the shuruk is identical to a dagesh, thus shuruq and vav with a dagesh are indistinguishable. (see below)
בוּ, בוּה, בוּא	Shuruk	melopum (Ashkenazi)	Tiberian	šūreq	שׁוּרֶק	[uː]	ū	
בּ	Dagesh	-	Israeli	dageš	דָּגֵשׁ	varied	varied	Not a vowel, "dagesh" refers to two distinct grammatical entities: 1. "dagesh kal", which designates the plosive (as opposed to fricative) variant of any of the letters בגדכפת (in earlier forms of Hebrew this distinction was allophonic; in Israeli Hebrew [[ג|ג]], [[ד|ד]] and [[ת|ת]] with or without dagesh kal are acoustically and phonologically indistinguishable, whereas plosive and fricative variants of [[ב|ב]], [[כ|כ]] and [[פ|פ]] are sometimes allophonic and sometimes distinct phonemes (e.g., אִפֵּר /iˈper/ applied make up vs. אִפֵר /iˈfer/ tipped ash).; 2. dagesh ḥazak", which designates gemination (prolonged pronunciation) of consonants, but which, although represented in most cases when transliterated according to standards of the Academy of the Hebrew Language, is acoustically and phonologically nonexistent in Modern Hebrew (except occasionally in dramatic or comical recitations, in some loanwords—such as a few Arabic profanities—and pronunciations exaggerated for the sake of disambiguation).; For most letters the dagesh is written within the glyph, near the middle if possible, but the exact position varies from letter to letter (some letters do not have an open area in the middle, and in these cases it is written usually beside the letter, as with yod). The guttural consonants (א, ה, ח, ע) and resh (ר) are not marked with a dagesh, although the letter he (ה) (and rarely א) may appear with a mappiq (which is written the same way as dagesh) at the end of a word to indicate that the letter does not signify a vowel but is consonantal. To the resulting form, there can still be added a niqqud diacritic designating a vowel.
בּ	Dagesh	-	Tiberian	dāḡēš	דָּגֵשׁ			
בֿ	Rafe	raphe	Israeli	rafe	רָפֵה	Ø	a˺, e˺, i˺, o˺, or u˺	No longer used in Hebrew. Still seen in Yiddish (especially following the YIVO standard) to distinguish various letter pairs. Some ancient manuscripts have a dagesh or a rafe on nearly every letter. It is also used to indicate that a letter like ה or א is silent. In the particularly strange case of the Ten Commandments, which have two different traditions for their cantillations which many texts write together, there are cases of a single letter with both a dagesh and a rafe, if it is hard in one reading and soft in the other.
בֿ	Rafe	raphe	Tiberian	rāfē	רָפֵה	[◌̆]	ă, ĕ, ĭ, or ŭ	Niqqud, but not a vowel. Used as an "anti-dagesh", to show that a בגדכפ״ת letter is soft and not hard, or (sometimes) that a consonant is single and not double, or that a letter like ה or א is completely silent.
שׁ	Shin dot	-	Israeli and Tiberian	šin dot	שִׁי"ן, שִׁי״ן יְמָנִית, "right Shin"	[ʃ]	š/sh	Niqqud, but not a vowel (except when inadequate typefaces merge the holam of a letter before the shin with the shin dot). The dot for shin is written over the right (first) branch of the letter. It is usually transcribed "sh".
שׂ	Sin dot	-	Israeli	śin dot	שִׂי"ן, שִׁי״ן שְׂמָאלִית, "left Shin"	[s]	ś/s	Niqqud, but not a vowel (except when inadequate typefaces merge the holam of the sin with the sin dot). The dot for sin is written over the left (third) branch of the letter.
שׂ	Sin dot	-	Tiberian	śin dot	שִׂי"ן, שִׁי״ן שְׂמָאלִית, "left Shin"	[s]	ś/s	Some linguistic evidence indicates that it was originally IPA [ɬ].

== Keyboard ==
Both consonants and niqqud can be typed from virtual graphical keyboards available on the World Wide Web, or by methods integrated into particular operating systems.

=== Microsoft Windows ===
- In Windows 8 or later, niqqud can be entered using the right alt (or left alt + ctrl) + the first Hebrew letter of the name of the value, when using the default (Hebrew Standard) keyboard layout:

Niqqud	Right Alt (=AltGr) + Hebrew-keyboard key:	Explanation (usually the first Hebrew letter of the niqqud's name)
אָ	AltGr+ק for קָמץ (kamatz)	first Hebrew letter of the niqqud's name
אַ	AltGr+פ for פַתח (patach)	
בְ	AltGr+ש for שְׁווא (sheva)	
בּ וּ הּ	AltGr+ד for דּגש (dagesh)	
אִ	AltGr+ח for חִירִיק (hiriq)	
אֶ	AltGr+ס for סֶגול (segol)	
אֵ	AltGr+צ for צֵירֵי (tsere)	
אֹ	AltGr+ו for חוֹלם (holam)	the ו key (like the 'o' vowel), since the ח key is already used for hiriq
אֻ	AltGr+\ for קֻבּוּץ (kubuts)	because the line \ visually resembles ֻ
אֲ	AltGr+[ for reduced patach פַתח	the key to the right of פ
אֳ	AltGr+ר for reduced kamats קָמץ	the key to the right of ק
אֱ	AltGr+ב for reduced segol סֶגול	the key to the right of ס
שׁ	AltGr+W for the Shin dot	the key above ש, right-side, since the dot is placed above ש, right-side
שׂ	AltGr+Q for the Sin dot	the key above ש, left-side, since the dot is placed above ש, left-side
בֿ	AltGr+] for רפֿה (rafe)	

- In Windows 7 or earlier, niqqud can be entered by enabling Caps Lock and then, with the cursor positioned after a letter, pressing Shift and one of the keys in the Windows column below.
- The user can configure the registry to allow use of the Alt key with the numeric plus key to type the hexadecimal Unicode value.
- The user can use the Microsoft Keyboard Layout Creator to produce a custom keyboard layout, or can download a layout produced by another party.

=== Linux ===
In GTK+ Linux systems, niqqud can be entered by holding down AltGR and pressing the same keys as for Windows, above, or by pressing ctrl+shift+u followed by the appropriate 4 digit Unicode.

=== macOS ===
Using the Hebrew keyboard layout in macOS, the typist can enter niqqud by pressing the Option key together with a number on the top row of the keyboard. Other combinations such as sofit and hataf can also be entered by pressing either the Shift key and a number, or by pressing the Shift key, Option key, and a number at the same time.

Niqqud input
Input (Windows)	Key (Windows)	Input (macOS)	Unicode	Type	Result
~		0	05B0	Sh'va	^{[1]}
1		3	05B1	Reduced Segol	^{[1]}
2		1	05B2	Reduced Patach	^{[1]}
3		2	05B3	Reduced Kamatz	^{[1]}
4		4	05B4	Hiriq	^{[1]}
5		5	05B5	Zeire	^{[1]}
6		9	05B6	Segol	^{[1]}
7		6	05B7	Patach	^{[]}
8		7	05B8	Kamatz	^{1}
9		A	05C2	Sin dot (left)	^{2}
0		M	05C1	Shin dot (right)	^{2}
–		=	05B9	Holam	^{1}
= ^{3}		,	05BC	Dagesh or Mappiq	^{1}
= ^{3}		U	05BC	Shuruk	^{4}
\		8	05BB	Kubutz	^{1}

Notes:

- ^{1} The letter "ס" represents any Hebrew consonant.
- ^{2} For sin-dot and shin-dot, the letter "ש" (sin/shin) is used.
- ^{3} The dagesh, mappiq, and shuruk have different uses, but the same graphical representation, and hence are input in the same manner.
- ^{4} For shuruk, the letter "ו" (vav) is used since it can only be used with that letter.
- A rafe can be input by inserting the corresponding Unicode character, either explicitly or via a customized keyboard layout.

SIL Global have developed another standard, which is based on Tiro, but adds the Niqqud along the home keys. Linux comes with "Israel — Biblical Hebrew (Tiro)" as a standard layout. With this layout, niqqud can be typed without pressing the Caps Lock key.

== See also ==
- Arabic diacritics#I‘jām (phonetic distinctions of consonants)
- Hebrew diacritics
- Qere and Ketiv#Qere perpetuum
- Hebrew spelling
- Tiberian Hebrew
- Hebrew keyboard

== Bibliography ==
- Gonen, Einat; Dan, Barak (2006). Gadish, Ronit (ed.). "Leshonenu La′am. Academy Decisions: Grammar". Ha-ʻIvrit (in Hebrew). Jerusalem: The Academy of the Hebrew Language. ISSN 0024-1091.
- Gesenius' Hebrew Grammar, especially §7, §8, §9
- Netzer, Nisan (1976). Haniqqud halakha lema′ase (in Hebrew). Israel: Massada.
