= Dalet =

Fourth letter of many Semitic alphabets

← Gimel Dalet He →
- Phoenician: 𐤃
- Hebrew: ד
- Samaritan: ࠃ
- Aramaic: 𐡃
- Syriac: ܕ
- Nabataean: 𐢅
- Arabic: د
- South Arabian: 𐩵
- Geʽez: ደ
- North Arabian: 𐪕
- Ugaritic: 𐎄
- Phonemic representation: d, ð
- Position in alphabet: 4
- Numerical value: 4

Alphabetic derivatives of the Phoenician
- Greek: Δ
- Latin: D
- Cyrillic: Д

Dalet (dāleth, also spelled Daleth or Daled) is the fourth letter of the Semitic abjads, including Phoenician dālt 𐤃, Hebrew dālet ד, Aramaic dālaṯ 𐡃, Syriac dālaṯ ܕ, and Arabic dāl د (in abjadi order; 8th in modern order). Its sound value is the voiced alveolar plosive ([d]). It is also related to the Ancient North Arabian 𐪕, South Arabian 𐩵, and Ge'ez ደ.

The letter is based on a glyph of the Proto-Sinaitic script, probably called dalt 'door' (door in Modern Hebrew is delet), ultimately based on a hieroglyph depicting a door:

O31

== Arabic dāl ==
The letter is named dāl (دَالْ), and is written in several ways depending on its position in the word:

Position in word:	Isolated	Final	Medial	Initial
Glyph form: (Help)	د	ـد	ـد	د

The letter represents a /d/ sound.

== Phoenician ==
The Phoenician dālet gave rise to the Greek delta (Δ), Latin D, and the Cyrillic letter Д.

== Hebrew dalet ==
Orthographic variants
Various print fonts			Cursive Hebrew	Solitreo	Rashi script
Serif	Sans-serif	Monospaced	Cursive Hebrew	Solitreo	Rashi script
ד	ד	ד			

Hebrew spelling: דָּלֶת

The letter is dalet in the modern Israeli Hebrew pronunciation (see Tav (letter)). Dales is still used by many Ashkenazi Jews and daleth by some Jews of Middle-Eastern background, especially in the Jewish diaspora. In some academic circles, it is called daleth, following the Tiberian Hebrew pronunciation. It is also called daled. The ד like the English D represents a voiced alveolar stop. Just as in English, there may be subtle varieties of the sounds that are created when it is spoken.

=== Variations ===
Dalet can receive a dagesh, being one of the six letters that can receive Dagesh Kal (see Gimel). There are minor variations to this letter's pronunciation, such as

- ד dhaleth /d/ (/ð/ among Teimanim, Mizrachim and some Sephardim; /z/ among some Ashkenazim.) or
- דּ daleth /d/.

In addition, in modern Hebrew, the combination ד׳ (dalet followed by a geresh) is used when transcribing foreign names to denote /ð/.

=== Significance ===
In gematria, dalet symbolizes the number four.

The letter dalet, along with the He (and very rarely Gimel) is used to represent the Names of God in Judaism. The letter He is used commonly, and the dalet is rarer. A good example is the keter (crown) of a tallit, which has the blessing for donning the tallit, and has the name of God usually represented by a dalet. A reason for this is that He is used as an abbreviation for HaShem "The Name" and the dalet is used as a non-sacred way of referring to God.

Dalet as a prefix in Aramaic (the language of the Talmud) is a preposition meaning "that", or "which", or also "from" or "of"; since many Talmudic terms have found their way into Hebrew, one can hear dalet as a prefix in many phrases (as in Mitzvah Doraitah; a mitzvah from the Torah).

In an undisclosed sample of Modern Hebrew writings the frequency of the usage of dalet was discovered to be is 2.59%.

== Syriac daled/dolath ==
Daled/Dolath
Madnḫaya daled
Serṭo dolath
Esṭrangela dalath

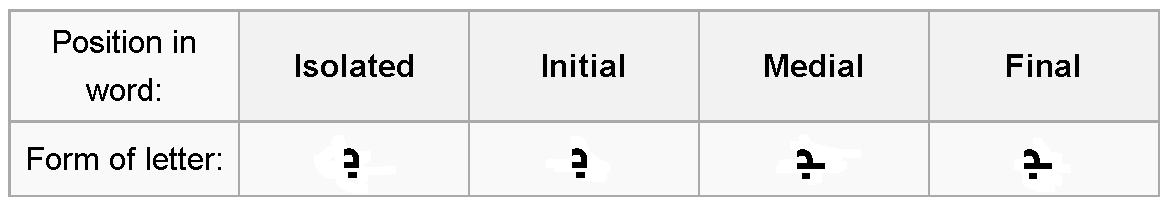

In the Syriac alphabet, the fourth letter is ܕ — dolath in western pronunciation, dalath and daled in eastern pronunciation (ܕܵܠܵܬ). It is one of six letters that represents two associated sounds (the others are bet, gimel, kaph, pe and taw). When daled/dolath has a hard pronunciation (qûššāyâ) it is a [d]. When it has a soft pronunciation (rûkkāḵâ) it is traditionally pronounced as a [ð]. The letter is very common in Syriac as it is often attached to the beginning of words as the relative pronoun.

Daled/dolath is always written with a point below it to distinguish it from the letter resh (ܪ), which is identical apart from having a point above. As a numeral, dalad/dolath stands for the number four. With various systems of dots and dashes, it can also stand for 4,000 and 40,000.

== Other uses ==
=== Mathematics ===
In set theory, the dalet symbol U+2138 ℸ DALET SYMBOL is sometimes used to reference the fourth transfinite cardinal number.

== Character encodings ==
Character information
Preview	ד		د		ܕ		ࠃ		ℸ	
Unicode name	HEBREW LETTER DALET		ARABIC LETTER DAL		SYRIAC LETTER DALATH		SAMARITAN LETTER DALAT		DALET SYMBOL	
Encodings	decimal	hex	dec	hex	dec	hex	dec	hex	dec	hex
Unicode	1491	U+05D3	1583	U+062F	1813	U+0715	2051	U+0803	8504	U+2138
UTF-8	215 147	D7 93	216 175	D8 AF	220 149	DC 95	224 160 131	E0 A0 83	226 132 184	E2 84 B8
Numeric character reference	&#1491;	&#x5D3;	&#1583;	&#x62F;	&#1813;	&#x715;	&#2051;	&#x803;	&#8504;	&#x2138;
Named character reference									&daleth;	

Character information
Preview	𐎄		𐡃		𐤃	
Unicode name	UGARITIC LETTER DELTA		IMPERIAL ARAMAIC LETTER DALETH		PHOENICIAN LETTER DELT	
Encodings	decimal	hex	dec	hex	dec	hex
Unicode	66436	U+10384	67651	U+10843	67843	U+10903
UTF-8	240 144 142 132	F0 90 8E 84	240 144 161 131	F0 90 A1 83	240 144 164 131	F0 90 A4 83
UTF-16	55296 57220	D800 DF84	55298 56387	D802 DC43	55298 56579	D802 DD03
Numeric character reference	&#66436;	&#x10384;	&#67651;	&#x10843;	&#67843;	&#x10903;

== See also ==
- History of the alphabet § Semitic alphabet
- Proto-Sinaitic script
