= Taw =

Letter of many Semitic alphabets

← Shin Taw
- Phoenician: 𐤕
- Hebrew: ת
- Samaritan: ࠕ
- Aramaic: 𐡕
- Syriac: ܬ
- Nabataean: 𐢞
- Arabic: ت
- South Arabian: 𐩩
- Geʽez: ተ
- North Arabian: 𐪉
- Ugaritic: 𐎚
- Phonemic representation: t (also θ, s)
- Position in alphabet: 22
- Numerical value: 400

Alphabetic derivatives of the Phoenician
- Greek: Τ
- Latin: T
- Cyrillic: Т

Taw, tav, or taf is the twenty-second and last letter of the Semitic abjads, including Arabic tāʾ ت, Aramaic taw 𐡕, Hebrew tav ת, Phoenician tāw 𐤕, and Syriac taw ܬ. In Arabic, it also gives rise to the derived letter ث ṯāʾ. Taw's original sound value has been claimed to be /t/. It is related to the Ancient North Arabian 𐪉, South Arabian 𐩩, and Geʽez ተ.

The Phoenician letter potentially gave rise to the Greek tau (Τ), Latin T, and Cyrillic Т.

== Origins ==
Taw is believed to be derived from the Egyptian hieroglyph representing a tally mark.

Hieroglyph	Proto-Sinaitic	Phoenician	Paleo-Hebrew
Z9			

== Arabic tāʾ ==
Tāʾ تاء
- ت

Usage
- Writing system: Arabic script
- Type: Abjad
- Language of origin: Arabic language
- Sound values: t
- Alphabetical position: 3

History
- Development: 𐤕: 𐡕; 𐢞; ٮ; ت

Other
- Writing direction: Right-to-left

The letter is named tāʼ. It is written in several ways depending on its position in the word:

Position in word:	Isolated	Final	Medial	Initial
Glyph form: (Help)	ت	ـت	ـتـ	تـ

Final ـَتْ (fatha, then tāʼ with a sukun on it, pronounced /at/, though diacritics are normally omitted) is used to mark feminine gender for third-person perfective/past tense verbs, while final تَ (tāʼ-fatḥa, /ta/) is used to mark past-tense second-person singular masculine verbs, final تِ (tāʼ-kasra, /ti/) to mark past-tense second-person singular feminine verbs, and final تُ (tāʼ-ḍamma, /tu/) to mark past-tense first-person singular verbs. The plural form of Arabic letter ت is tāʼāt (تاءات), a palindrome.

Recently, the isolated ت has been used online as an emoticon in the Western world, because it resembles a smiling face.

=== Tā' marbūṭa ===
An alternative form (ـَة, ة) called tāʼ marbūṭa (تَاءْ مَرْبُوطَة), "bound tāʼ ", is used at the end of words to mark feminine gender for nouns and adjectives. Regular tāʼ, to distinguish it from tāʼ marbūṭa, is referred to as tāʼ maftūḥa (تَاءْ مَفْتُوحَة, "open tāʼ").

Position in word:	Isolated	Final	Medial	Initial
Glyph form: (Help)	ة	ـة	ـة	ة

In words such as رِسَالَة ('letter, message, epistle'), the fatha (/a/) + tāʼ marbūṭa combination (ـَة) is transliterated as -a or -ah (risāla or risālah), and pronounced as /-a/ (as if there were only a fatha). Historically, tāʼ marbūṭa was pronounced as the /t/ sound in all positions, but now the /t/ sound is dropped in coda positions.

However, when a word ending with a tāʼ marbūṭa is suffixed with a grammatical case ending or any other suffix, the /t/ is clearly pronounced. For example, the word رِسَالَة ('letter, message', 'epistle') is pronounced as risāla in pausa but is pronounced risālatun in the nominative case (/un/ being the nominative case ending), risālatin in the genitive case (/in/ being the genitive case ending), and risālatan in the accusative case (/an/ being the accusative case ending). When the possessive suffix -ī ('my') is added, it becomes risālatī ('my letter') . The /t/ is also always pronounced when the word is in construct state (iḍāfa), for example in Risālat al-Ghufrān ('The Epistle of Forgiveness').

The isolated and final forms of this letter combine the shape of hāʼ (ه) and the two dots of tāʼ (ت). When words containing the symbol are borrowed into other languages written in the Arabic script, such as Persian, tāʼ marbūṭa usually becomes either a regular ه or a regular ت.

== Hebrew tav ==
Orthographic variants
Various print fonts			Cursive Hebrew	Solitreo	Rashi script
Serif	Sans-serif	Monospaced	Cursive Hebrew	Solitreo	Rashi script
ת	ת	ת			

Hebrew spelling: תָּיו, תָּי״ו

=== Hebrew pronunciation ===
The letter tav in Modern Hebrew usually represents a voiceless alveolar plosive: /t/.

==== Variations on written form and pronunciation ====
The letter tav is one of the six letters that can receive a dagesh kal diacritic; the others are bet, gimel, dalet, kaph and pe. Bet, kaph and pe have their sound values changed in Modern Hebrew from the fricative to the plosive, by adding a dagesh. In modern Hebrew, the other three do not change their pronunciation with or without a dagesh, but they have had alternate pronunciations at other times and places.

In traditional Ashkenazi pronunciation, tav represents an /s/ without the dagesh and has the plosive form when it has the dagesh. Among Yemen and some Sephardi areas, tav without a dagesh represented a voiceless dental fricative /θ/—a pronunciation hailed by the Sfath Emeth work as wholly authentic, while the tav with the dagesh is the plosive /t/. In traditional Italian pronunciation, tav without a dagesh is sometimes /d/.

=== Significance of tav ===
In gematria, tav represents the number 400, the largest single number that can be represented without using the sophit (final) forms (see kaph, mem, nun, pe, and tzade).

In representing loanwords and names from foreign languages, a geresh can also be placed after the tav (ת׳), making it represent /θ/. (See also: Hebraization of English)

==== In Judaism ====
Tav is the last letter of the Hebrew word emet, which means 'truth'. The midrash explains that emet is made up of the first, middle, and last letters of the Hebrew alphabet (aleph, mem, and tav: אמת). Sheqer (שקר, falsehood), on the other hand, is made up of the 19th, 20th, and 21st (and penultimate) letters.

Thus, truth is all-encompassing, while falsehood is narrow and deceiving. In Jewish mythology it was the word emet that was carved into the head of the Golem which ultimately gave it life. But when the letter aleph was erased from the golem's forehead, what was left was "met"—dead. And so the golem died.

Ezekiel 9:4 depicts a vision in which the tav plays a Passover role similar to the blood on the lintel and doorposts of a Hebrew home in Egypt. In Ezekiel's vision, the Lord has his angels separate the demographic wheat from the chaff by going through Jerusalem, the capital city of ancient Israel, and inscribing a mark, a tav, "upon the foreheads of the men that sigh and that cry for all the abominations that be done in the midst thereof."

In Ezekiel's vision, then, the Lord is counting tav-marked Israelites as worthwhile to spare, but counts the people worthy of annihilation who lack the tav and the critical attitude it signifies. In other words, looking askance at a culture marked by dire moral decline is a kind of shibboleth for loyalty and zeal for God.

==== Sayings with taf ====
״מאל״ף עד תי״ו״, "From aleph to taf" describes something from beginning to end, the Hebrew equivalent of the English "From A to Z."

== Syriac taw ==
In the Syriac alphabet, as in the Hebrew and Phoenician alphabets, taw (ܬܰܐܘ) or tăw (ܬܲܘ or ܬܰܘ) is the final letter in the alphabet, most commonly representing the voiceless dental stop [t̪] and fricative [θ] consonant pair, differentiated phonemically by hard and soft markings. When left as unmarked ܬ ܬ ܬ or marked with a qūššāyā dot above the letter ܬ݁ ܬ݁ ܬ݁ indicating 'hard' pronunciation, it is realized as a plosive /t/. When the phoneme is marked with a rūkkāḵā dot below the letter ܬ݂ ܬ݂ ܬ݂ indicating 'soft' pronunciation, the phone is spirantized to a fricative /θ/. Hard taw (taw qšīṯā) is Romanized as a plain t, while the soft form of the letter (taw rakkīḵtā) is transliterated as ṯ or th.

ʾEsṭrangēlā (classical)	Maḏnḥāyā (eastern)	Serṭo (western)	Unicode character
			ܬ ܬ ܬ

Position in word:	Isolated	Final	Medial	Initial
Glyph form: (Help)	ܬ	ـܬ	ـܬـ	ܬـ

== Character encodings ==
Character information
Preview	ת		ت		ܬ	
Unicode name	HEBREW LETTER TAV		ARABIC LETTER TEH		SYRIAC LETTER TAW	
Encodings	decimal	hex	dec	hex	dec	hex
Unicode	1514	U+05EA	1578	U+062A	1836	U+072C
UTF-8	215 170	D7 AA	216 170	D8 AA	220 172	DC AC
Numeric character reference	&#1514;	&#x5EA;	&#1578;	&#x62A;	&#1836;	&#x72C;

Character information
Preview	ࠕ		𐎚		𐡕		𐤕	
Unicode name	SAMARITAN LETTER TOF		UGARITIC LETTER TO		IMPERIAL ARAMAIC LETTER TAW		PHOENICIAN LETTER TAU	
Encodings	decimal	hex	dec	hex	dec	hex	dec	hex
Unicode	2069	U+0815	66458	U+1039A	67669	U+10855	67861	U+10915
UTF-8	224 160 149	E0 A0 95	240 144 142 154	F0 90 8E 9A	240 144 161 149	F0 90 A1 95	240 144 164 149	F0 90 A4 95
UTF-16	2069	0815	55296 57242	D800 DF9A	55298 56405	D802 DC55	55298 56597	D802 DD15
Numeric character reference	&#2069;	&#x815;	&#66458;	&#x1039A;	&#67669;	&#x10855;	&#67861;	&#x10915;
