= Academy of the Hebrew Language =

Israeli institution established in 1953

- האקדמיה ללשון העברית
- Formation: 1890 – Hebrew Language Committee; 1953 – Academy of the Hebrew Language
- Type: Governmental organization
- Legal status: Language regulator
- Purpose: To regulate the Hebrew language
- Headquarters: Givat Ram, Jerusalem, Israel
- Coordinates: 31°46′20.34″N 35°11′54.71″E
- Region served: Hebrew-speaking population
- Official language: Modern Hebrew
- President: Aharon Maman
- Staff: 38
- Website: hebrew-academy.org.il
- Formerly called: Hebrew Language Committee

The Academy of the Hebrew Language (Hebrew: הָאָקָדֶמְיָה לַלָּשׁוֹן הָעִבְרִית, ha-akademyah la-lashon ha-ivrit) was established by the Israeli government in 1953 as the "supreme institution for scholarship on the Hebrew language in the Hebrew University of Jerusalem of Givat Ram campus."

Its stated aims are to assemble and research the Hebrew language in all its layers throughout the ages; to investigate the origin and development of the Hebrew tongue; and to direct the course of development of Hebrew, in all areas, including vocabulary, grammar, writing, spelling, and transliteration.

Since 2022, the Academy has been headed by Aharon Maman. It is composed of 42 members, in addition to having members who serve as academic advisors, as well as honorary members. Every person is entitled to query the Academy on language matters and to receive a formal reply.

== History ==
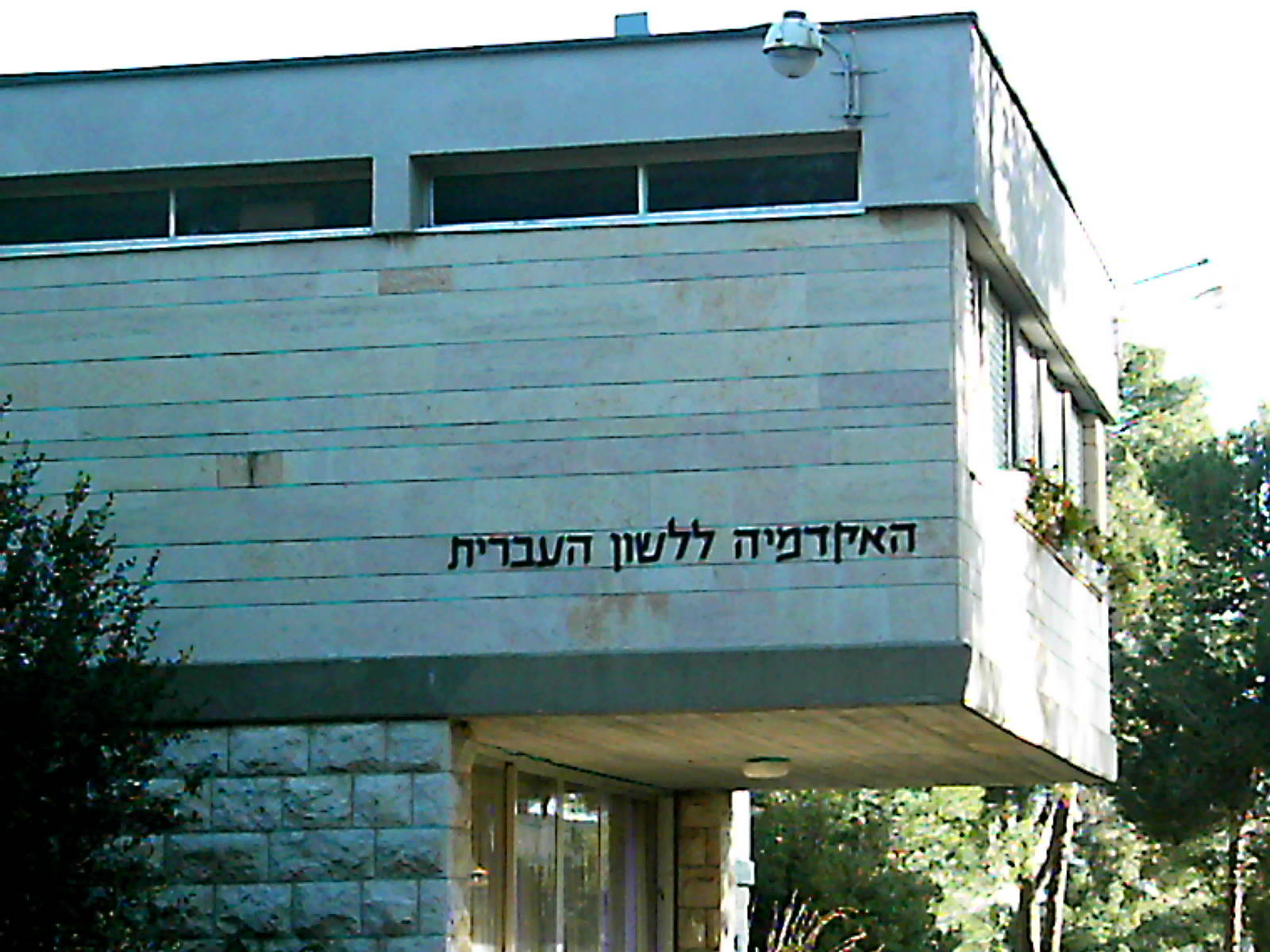
The Academy of the Hebrew Language building at the Hebrew University Givat Ram campus

The Academy replaced the Hebrew Language Committee (Vaʻad ha-lashon ha-ʻIvrit) established in 1890 by Eliezer Ben-Yehuda, who was its first president. As Hebrew became the spoken language in Palestine and was adopted by the educational system, the Hebrew Language Committee published bulletins and dictionaries. It coined thousands of words that are in everyday use today.

Its successor, the Academy of the Hebrew Language, has continued this mission of creating new Hebrew words to keep up modern usage.

Although the academy's business is creating new words from Hebrew roots and structures to replace loanwords derived from other languages, its own name is a loanword, "akademya." It addresses this irony on its English website.

The Academy's mission, as defined in its constitution, is "to direct the development of Hebrew in light of its nature" (לכוון את דרכי התפתחותה של הלשון העברית לפי טבעה). The Academy sets standards for modern Hebrew grammar, orthography, transliteration, and punctuation based on the historical development of the language. It also writes a Hebrew Historical Dictionary.

== Organization ==
The plenum consists of 42 members. In addition, the Academy employs 8 academic advisors, among them respected scholars of language, linguistics, Judaic studies, and Bible. It also has 9 honorary members. The Academy's decisions are binding on all governmental agencies, including the Israeli Public Broadcasting Corporation.

== See also ==
- Study of the Hebrew language
- List of language regulators
- Revival of the Hebrew language
- Historical Dictionary Project of the Hebrew Language
- Autoridad Nasionala del Ladino, a language regulator for Ladino
- YIVO (Yidisher Visnshaftlekher Institut), a language regulator for Yiddish
- Academy of the Arabic Language in Israel
