= Mizrahi Hebrew =

Pronunciation system for Biblical Hebrew

Mizrahi Hebrew, or Eastern Hebrew (Hebrew: הגייה מזרחית, romanized: hăgiyyâ mizrāḥît, lit. 'eastern pronunciation'), is a group of pronunciation systems for Biblical Hebrew used liturgically by Mizrahi Jews: Jews from Arab countries or east of them and with a background of Arabic, Persian or other languages of Asia. As such, Mizrahi Hebrew is actually a blanket term for many dialects.

Sephardi Hebrew is not considered one of these, even if it has been spoken in the Middle East and North Africa. The Sephardim were expellees from Spain and settled among the Mizrahim, but in countries such as Syria and Morocco, there was a fairly high degree of convergence between the Sephardi and the local pronunciations of Hebrew. Yemenite Hebrew is also considered quite separate, as it has a wholly different system for the pronunciation of vowels.

The same terms are sometimes used for the pronunciation of Modern Hebrew by Jews of Mizrahi origins. It is generally a compromise between Modern Standard Hebrew and the traditional liturgical pronunciation as described in this article. A common form of such compromise is the use of [ħ], [r] and [ʕ] for ח, ר and ע, respectively, with most or all other sounds pronounced as in Standard Israeli Hebrew.

== Features ==
The following features are generally found in the pronunciation of Jews from Arabic-speaking countries, and the variations tend to follow the Arabic dialect of the country in question.

- The stress tends to fall on the last syllable wherever that is the case in Biblical Hebrew.
- א (Aleph) is pronounced with a clear glottal stop [ʔ] except when it is used as a mater lectionis.
- ב (Bet without dagesh) is pronounced [b] in some countries (such as among some Syrians) and [v] (voiced labiodental fricative) in others (such as Morocco). In Iraq, it is pronounced /β/, between a /w/ and /b/ sound. (Note: The [b] presumably reflects the influence of Arabic, which has no [v]. The [v] pronunciation may reflect the influence of Sephardic immigrants from and after 1492, as it is also found in the pronunciation of Ottoman Sephardim (but not all Sephardim: see Sephardi Hebrew). The pronunciation before 1492, both in Spain and in Arabic-speaking countries, is unclear.)
- ג (Gimel without dagesh) is pronounced [ɣ] (voiced velar fricative) like Arabic غ.
- ד (Dalet without dagesh) is normally pronounced [d], but occasionally (such as in the Iraqi pronunciation of the words adonai and, in the Shema only, eḥad) [ð], like Arabic ذ (voiced dental fricative).
- ו (Vav) is pronounced [v] in some countries and [w] in others (such Iraq).
- ח (Ḥet) is pronounced [ħ], like Arabic ح (voiceless pharyngeal fricative).
- ט (Ṭēth) is pronounced [tˤ], like Arabic ط (pharyngealized voiceless alveolar stops).
- כ (Kaph without dagesh) is pronounced [x], like Arabic خ (voiceless velar fricative).
- ע (Ayin) is pronounced [ʕ], like the Arabic ع (voiced pharyngeal fricative).
- צ (Tsade) is pronounced [sˤ], like Arabic ص (pharyngealized voiceless alveolar fricative).
- ק (Qoph) is usually pronounced [q] like Arabic ق (voiceless uvular stop), but other sounds occur such as [k], [ɡ] or [ʔ] (glottal stop).
- ר (Resh) is trilled [r], even among Baghdadi Jews, who pronounced the equivalent letter in Judaeo-Arabic as a uvular [ʀ], close to Arabic غ. (Note: Baghdad Jews traditionally used the uvular sound in Judaeo-Arabic. The peculiarity has been present for centuries, as old manuscript translations of the Bible into Iraqi Judaeo-Arabic often confuse ra with ghayn, but that mistake is not found in translations into other dialects.)
- ת (Tav without dagesh) is pronounced [t] in some countries and [θ]—like Arabic ث (voiceless dental fricative)—in others, such as Iraq. (Note: The difference usually follows differences in the local dialect of Arabic; however, Sephardim are divided on the pronunciation of this letter, with [t] predominating.)
- Vowels generally have the same sounds as in Sephardi Hebrew:
  - Tzere is pronounced [eː].
  - Holam is pronounced [oː].
  - Kamatz gadol is pronounced [aː].

The pronunciation of Mizrahi Jews from non-Arab countries differs in some respects. For example, among Persian Jews, distinctively Arabic sounds such as ح [ħ] and ط [tˤ] do not occur, and certain sounds do occur which are not present in other forms of Mizrahi Hebrew. For example, Kamatz gadol is pronounced [ɒ], like the long ā ا/آ in Persian, ק (Qof) is approximately pronounced [ɣ] (voiced velar fricative), and ח (Het) is pronounced identical to ה (Hay), as opposed to the Arab ح [ħ].

== History ==
In Talmudic times, it was noted that the Galilean (and maybe Syrian) pronunciation of Hebrew and Aramaic differed from those of both Judaea and Babylonia, principally by the loss of distinct sounds for the guttural letters he, ḥet, and ʿayin. That feature is still found in Samaritan Hebrew.

After the Arab conquest of Palestine and Mesopotamia, much work was done by the Masoretes in standardising and refining the pronunciation of Biblical Hebrew, under the influence of the Arabic grammarians of the time. That included establishing the pronunciation of the guttural letters by reference to their Arabic equivalents. Three distinct notations for the vowels were devised: the Palestinian, the Babylonian and the Tiberian, the last of which eventually superseded the others.

The distinctive Babylonian pronunciation of Geonic times is still preserved by Yemenite Jews, but they do not retain the Babylonian notation. In Iraq, it appears to have been superseded by the Palestinian pronunciation (similar to today's Sephardi Hebrew) in or around the 11th century, when the Tiberian notation was adopted: both Saadia Gaon and Jacob Qirqisani report that in their time the Palestinian pronunciation had come to be regarded as standard. Nevertheless, in their reading of unvocalised texts such as the Mishnah, Baghdadi Jews preserve certain peculiarities of the old Babylonian pronunciation, particularly with their choices between dagesh and rafe and between silent and vocal sheva.

The process of assimilation to Arabic went the furthest with the Babylonian Jews. For example, in Classical Arabic and in some spoken dialects including Mesopotamian Arabic, there is no phonemic distinction between a and e, but a phonetic difference is made by the presence of an adjacent emphatic or guttural consonant. Accordingly, the Babylonian notation does not distinguish between patach (in other pronunciations [a]), segol (in other pronunciations [e] or [ɛ]) and sheva na', and the three vowels are still pronounced alike (as [æ]) by Yemenite Jews. In Levantine Arabic, by contrast, there are distinct a and e sounds, and both vowels are distinguished in both the Palestinian and the Tiberian notations. (Note: However, the distinction is differently applied in Tiberian Hebrew and Levantine Arabic. For example, the feminine ending is -ah in Tiberian Hebrew and -é in Levantine Arabic.)

After the expulsion of the Jews from Spain in 1492, Sephardic exiles took the leading position in most Arab and Ottoman countries, and the local pronunciation of Hebrew assimilated to Sephardi Hebrew in many respects, particularly for pronouncing the vowels. Today's Iraqi Jews distinguish between patach (/a/) and segol (/e/) in the same way as most other Sephardi and Mizrahi Jews. However, distinct sounds for the guttural and emphatic letters and the [b] sound for bet rafe were retained in many Arab countries, probably under the influence of Arabic.

Iraqi Jews, like Yemenite Jews, retain the Classical Arabic sounds of waw ([w]) and tav raphe ([θ]). In other Arab countries, tav raphe is pronounced [t], which is equally consistent with the pronunciation of both Sephardi Hebrew and of colloquial Arabic. The pronunciation of waw as [v], in countries other than Iraq and Yemen, is more clearly Sephardic in origin. (Note: However, Arabic /w/ becomes [v] in some North African dialects, in Persian and in Turkish.)

== See also ==
- Ashkenazi Hebrew
- Hebrew pronunciation of Syrian Jews

== Bibliography ==
- Idelsohn, Abraham Zevi (1917). Phonographierte Gesänge und Aussprachsproben des Hebräischen der jemenitischen, persischen und syrischen Juden [Phonographed chants and pronunciation samples of the Hebrew of the Yemeni, Persian and Syrian Jews] (in German). Vienna: Hölder.
- Katz, K. (1981). Masoret ha-lashon ha-'Ivrit shel Yehude Aram-Tsova (ִHalab) bi-qeriat ha-Miqra ve-ha-Mishnah [The Hebrew Language Tradition of the Jews of Aleppo in the Reading of the Bible and Mishnah]. Edah ve-Lashon (in Hebrew). Vol. 7. Jerusalem.
- Katz, K. Masoret ha-qeri'ah shel qehillat Jerba ba-Miqra u-va-Mishnah [The Hebrew Language Tradition of the Community of Djerba, Tunisia]. Edah ve-Lashon (in Hebrew). Vol. 2.
- Yeivin, I. (1985). The Hebrew Language Tradition as Reflected in the Babylonian Vocalization (in Hebrew). Jerusalem.
