= Hebrew point dagesh or mapiq =

The Hebrew diacritic U+05BC ּ HEBREW POINT DAGESH OR MAPIQ can represent:

- Dagesh, indicating a modification of the sound of a letter
- Mappiq, indicating that the letter He (ה) is to be pronounced as a consonant
- Shuruk, a niqqud vowel sign representing the sound Hebrew pronunciation: [/u/]
