= Rafe =

Diacritical mark used in Hebrew

Rafe
ֿ
Similar appearance	macron
Example
פֿיש
The word for fish in Yiddish, fish. The first diacritic (the line over the pei) is a rafe.
Other Niqqud
Shva · Hiriq · Zeire · Segol · Patach · Kamatz · Holam · Dagesh · Mappiq · Shuruk · Kubutz · Rafe · Sin/Shin Dot

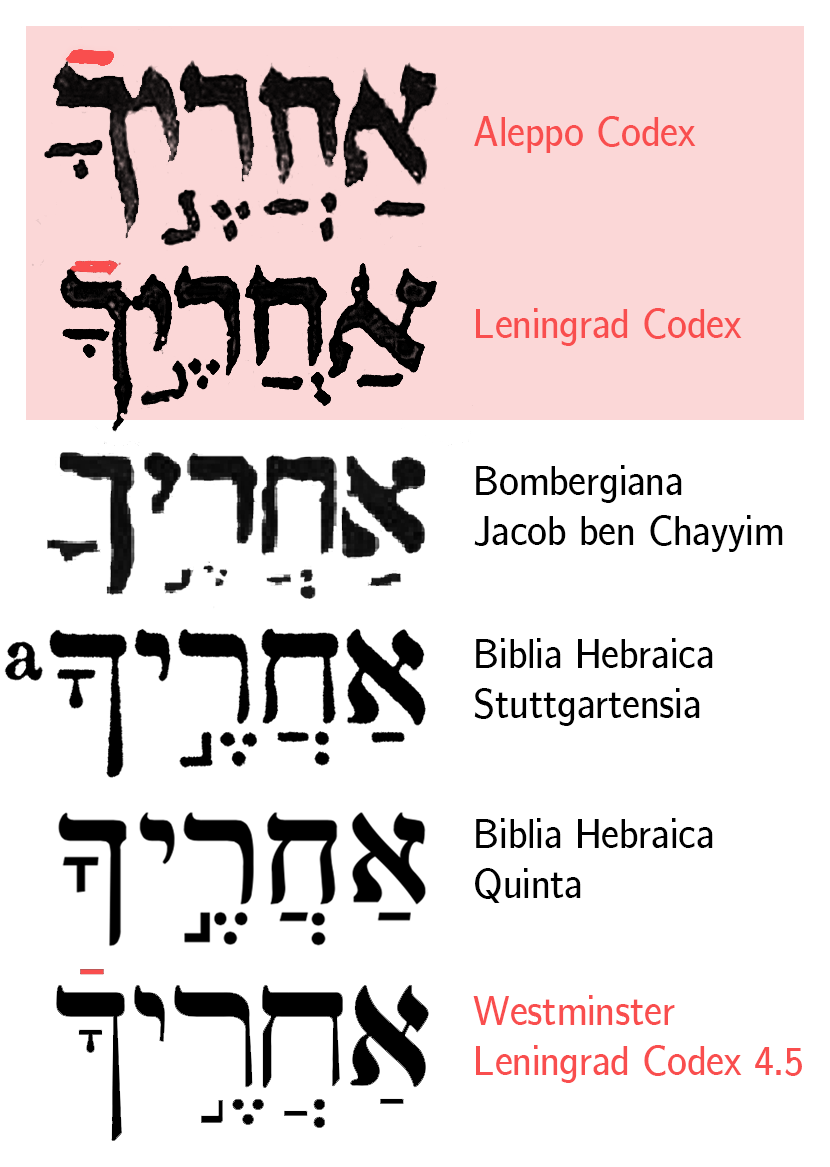
Typefaces of the word אחריך (’aḥăreḵā,, Songs 1:4a) in the two Masoretic Codices and four Hebrew Bible print editions. The rafe diacritic is mostly omitted in print editions.

In Hebrew orthography the rafe or raphe (Hebrew: רָפֶה, pronounced [ʁaˈfe], meaning "weak, limp") is a diacritic (⟨◌ֿ⟩), a subtle horizontal overbar placed above certain letters to indicate that they are to be pronounced as fricatives.

It originated with the Tiberian Masoretes as part of the extended system of niqqud (vowel points), and has the opposite meaning of dagesh, showing that one of the letters בגדכפת is to be pronounced as a fricative and not as a plosive, or (sometimes) that a consonant is not geminated; or, as the opposite to a mappiq, to show that the letters ה or א are silent (mater lectionis).

The rafe generally fell out of use for Hebrew with the coming of printing, although according to Gesenius (1813) at that time it could still be found in a few places in printed Hebrew Bibles, where the absence of a dagesh or a mappiq was noticeable. (e.g. Exodus 20:13,14,15; Deuteronomy 5:13,17,18,19; 2 Samuel 11:1; Isaiah 22:10; Jeremiah 20:17; Psalm 119:99; Zechariah 5:11)

In some siddurs (e.g. those printed by ArtScroll) a diacritical symbol, typographically the same as the rafe, but utterly unrelated, is used to mark instances of "moving sheva" (Shva Na).

The rafe is similar in function to the buailte (dot above, denoting lenition) in the old-style Irish alphabet.

== Yiddish ==
In standard Yiddish orthography, the rafe (Yiddish: רפֿה, romanized: rofe; colloquially also דעכעלע dekhele 'little roof') distinguishes פּ /p/ from פֿ /f/ and in words of Semitic origin also ב /b/ from בֿ /v/.

Name	Symbol	IPA	Transliteration	Example
pey	פּ	/p/	p	pan
fey	פֿ	/f/	f	fan

== Ladino ==
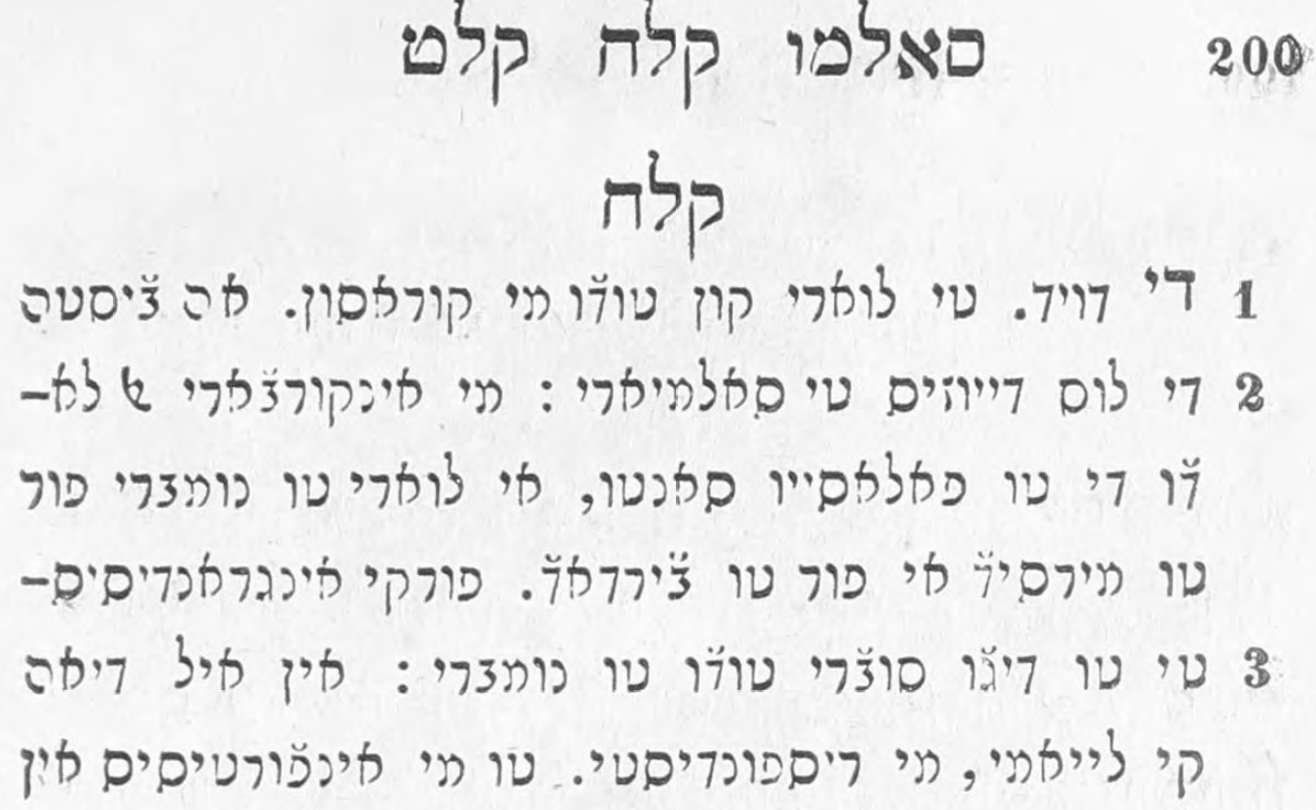
Text from a 19th-century printing of Psalm 138 in Ladino language, showing use of the curved “varrica” rafe atop letters written in Rashi script (titles/headings are in block print).

In Ladino the rafe, called a varrica (“little crossbar”), looks more like a breve-shaped diacritic (ﬞ ) on top of the letter (◌ﬞ). When written in the square form, or when unable to apply the varrica rafe diacritic to a letter, it is replaced by a geresh (׳) immediately after the letter as a substitute to effect the same change in pronunciation. For example, גﬞ is equivalent to ג׳ in altering the sound from the voiced velar stop [g] to the voiced postalveolar affricate [d͡ʒ], known in English as "soft g".

In Ladino, as in Tiberian Hebrew, the rafe changes ב [b] into בﬞ [v], ד [d] into דﬞ [ð], and פ [p] into פﬞ [f]. Unlike in Hebrew, the rafe also changes ג [g] into גﬞ ([d͡ʒ] or [t͡ʃ]), ז [z] into זﬞ [ʒ], and in words of Semitic origin also ש ([s] or [ʃ]) into שﬞ [ʃ]. In words of Romance origin, [s] is spelled as ס, freeing up ש for the voiceless postalveolar fricative [ʃ] without the need for a rafe to disambiguate.

Note Ladino orthography is far less standardized than Yiddish; original Ladino works may be written in Rashi script (using rafe), Hebrew block print (using geresh), or in the Latin alphabet (e.g. the 1553 Ferrara Bible).

Ladino letters formed using a 'varrica' rafe
Without Rafe				With Rafe (equivalent with geresh)			
Symbol	Translit.	IPA	Example	Symbol	Translit.	IPA	Example
ב	b	[b]	boy	(ב׳) בﬞ	v	[v]~[β̞]	voyage
ג	g	[ɡ]	gap	(ג׳) גﬞ	dj, ǧ, or ch, č	[d͡ʒ]~[t͡ʃ]	Jupiter, George, chip
ד	d	[d̪]	day	(ד׳) דﬞ	dh, th, ḏ, đ	[ð̞]	they
ז	z	[z]	zoo	(ז׳) זﬞ	j, g, zh, ž	[ʒ]	Jacques, beige, vision
ט	t	[t̪]	toy	(ט׳) טﬞ	th	[θ]	thirty
כ	c, k	[k]	care, king	(כ׳) כﬞ	ch, kh, k	[x]~[χ]	loch, Bach
פ	p	[p]	past	(פ׳) פﬞ	f	[f]	fast
ש	s, ç	[s]	sin, cent	(ש׳) שﬞ	sh, š	[ʃ]	shin

== Unicode ==
"Hebrew Point Rafe" is encoded in the Unicode standard as U+05BF.

== See also ==
- Dagesh
- Hebrew alphabet
- Hebrew phonology
- Macron
- Mappiq
- Yiddish orthography
