= Holam =

Hebrew niqqud vowel sign

Holam
ֹ
IPA	o or o̞
Transliteration	o
English example	shore
Similar sound	Qamatz qaṭan, ḥataf qamatz
Ḥolam Example
נֹעַר
The word noʿar (youth) in Hebrew. The first vowel (over Nun, the dot above) is the ḥolam.
Ḥolam male Example
חוֹלָם
The word ḥolam in Hebrew. The letter vav ⟨ו⟩ with the dot above it is the Ḥolam male itself.
Other Niqqud
Shva · Hiriq · Tzere · Segol · Patach · Kamatz · Holam · Dagesh · Mappiq · Shuruk · Kubutz · Rafe · Sin/Shin Dot

Holam or cholam (Israeli Hebrew: חוֹלָם, IPA: [χoˈlam]; Classical Hebrew: חֹלֶם, ḥōlem) is a Hebrew niqqud vowel sign represented by a dot above the upper left corner of the consonant letter. For example, here the holam appears after the letter mem ⟨מ⟩: מֹ. In modern Hebrew, it indicates the mid back rounded vowel, [o̞], and is transliterated as an o.

The mater lectionis letter which is usually employed with holam is vav, although in a few words, the letters alef or he are used instead of vav. When it is used with a mater lectionis, the holam is called holam male (חוֹלָם מָלֵא, IPA: [χoˈlam maˈle], "full holam"), and without it the holam is called holam haser (חוֹלָם חָסֵר, IPA: [χoˈlam χaˈser], "deficient holam").

== Appearance ==
If a holam is used without a following mater lectionis (vav, alef or he), as in פֹּה (/po/, "here"), it is written as a dot above at the upper-left corner of the letter after which it is pronounced. Letter-spacing is not supposed to be affected by it, although some buggy computer fonts may add an unneeded space before the next letter.

In the word דֹּאר, the Biblical Hebrew spelling of the name Dor, the alef is a mater lectionis, and in traditional typography the holam is written above the alef's right arm. In the word דֹּאַר (/ˈdo.aʁ/, "mail"), the alef is a consonant (a glottal stop), under which appears the vowel pataḥ, so the ḥolam is written above the previous letter's upper left corner. Not all fonts actually implement these placement rules, however.

If vav is used as a mater lectionis, the holam appears above the vav. If the mater lectionis is alef, as in לֹא (/lo/, "no"), it is supposed to appear above the alef's right hand, although this is not implemented in all computer fonts, and does not always appear even in professionally typeset modern books. This means a holam with alef may, in fact, appear in the same place as a regular holam haser. If the alef itself is not a mater lectionis, but a consonant, the holam appears in its regular place above the upper-left corner of the previous letter, as in תֹּאַר (/ˈto.aʁ/, "epithet").

If a holam haser is written after vav, as in לִגְוֺעַ (/liɡˈvo.a/, "to agonize"), it may appear above the vav, or slightly farther to the left; this varies between different fonts. In some fonts, a holam merges with the shin dot (which appears on the upper-right corner of its letter seat), in words such as חֹשֶׁךְ (ḥṓšeḵ, [ˈχoʃeχ], 'darkness') or with the sin dot, as in שֹׂבַע (/ˈsova/, 'satiation'). (These dots may or may not appear merged on your screen, as that depends on your device's Hebrew font.)

== Usage ==
Holam male is, in general, the most common way to write the /o/ sound in modern spelling with niqqud. If a word has Holam male in spelling with niqqud, the mater lectionis letter vav is without any exception retained in spelling without niqqud, both according to the spelling rules of the Academy of the Hebrew Language and in common practice.

The use of holam haser is restricted to certain word patterns, although many common words appear in them. In most cases the Academy's spelling rules mandate that the vav will be written even when the spelling with niqqud does not have it. The normative exceptions from this rule are listed below. The Academy's standard is not followed perfectly by all speakers, and common deviations from it are also noted below.

In Biblical Hebrew the above rules are not followed consistently, and sometimes the vav is omitted or added.

For further complications involving Kamatz katan and Hataf kamatz, see the article Kamatz.

=== Holam haser which is written as vav in text without niqqud ===
- In words in which the penultimate syllable has the vowel /o/ and is stressed (sometimes called segolate):
  - קֹטֶר ('diameter') /ˈkoteʁ/
  - זֹהַר ('radiance', Zohar), /ˈzohaʁ/
  - נֹגַהּ ('brightness', Nogah), /ˈnoɡa(h)/
  - דֹּאַר ('mail'), /ˈdo.aʁ/ or /ˈdoʔaʁ/.

Some people tend to spell some of these words without the vav, e.g. דאר instead of דואר, although the Academy mandates דואר. The tendency is especially strong when the words can be used as personal names.

- When Kubutz is changed to holam before guttural letters in the passive binyan Pual due to tashlum dagesh (a vowel-change due to the inability of guttural letters to carry a dagesh):
  - מְפֹאָר ('fancy'), /məfoˈʔaʁ/. Without niqqud: מפואר.
  - פֹּרַשׁ ('was explained'), /poˈʁaʃ/. Without niqqud: פורש.
- In words which have the pattern /CaCoC/ in the singular and become /CəCuCCim/ with Kubutz in the plural, especially names of colors:
  - כָּתֹם ('orange'), /kaˈtom/, pl. כְּתֻמִּים /kətumˈmim/
  - עָגֹל ('round'), /ʕaˈɡol/, pl. עֲגֻלִּים /ʕaɡulˈlim/.
- When the last letter of the root is guttural, holam haser is preserved due to tashlum dagesh:
  - שָׁחֹר ('black'), /ʃaˈχoʁ/, pl. שְׁחֹרִים /ʃəχoˈʁim/.
  Without niqqud: כתום, כתומים, עגול, עגולים, שחור, שחורים.
- A similar pattern, in which the last letter of the root is not doubled in declension, has holam male in the base form, which is preserved in declension:
  - sg. גָּדוֹל ('big'), /ɡaˈdol/, pl. גְּדוֹלִים /ɡədoˈlim/.
- In three words, a holam male is changed to a shuruk in declension:
  - מָגוֹר ('place of living'), /maˈɡoʁ/, pl. מְגוּרִים /məɡuˈʁim/
  - מָנוֹס ('escape'), /maˈnos/, pl. מְנוּסִים /mənuˈsim/;
  - מָתוֹק ('sweet'), /maˈtok/, pl. מְתוּקִים /mətuˈkim/.
- Similar to the above is the pattern /CəCaCCoC/, with reduplication of the second and third letters of the root:
  - פְּתַלְתֹּל ('crooked'), /pətalˈtol/, pl. פְּתַלְתֻּלִּים /pətaltulˈlim/. Without niqqud: פתלתול, פתלתולים.
- In the future, infinitive and imperative forms of most verbs in binyan Qal:
  - אֶסְגֹּר ('I shall close'), /ʔesˈɡoʁ/, לִסְגֹּר ('to close'), /lisˈɡoʁ/, סְגֹר ('close!'), /səɡoʁ/. Without niqqud: אסגור, לסגור, סגור.
- In words, whose roots' second and third letter are the same, in which case in declension the holam changes to Kubutz after which there will be a dagesh:
  - כֹּל all, /kol/, decl. כֻּלּהּ /kulˈlah/ ('all of her'), root כ־ל־ל
  - רֹב ('most'), /rov/, decl. רֻבּוֹ /rubˈbo/ ('most of him'), root ר־ב־ב
  - תֹּף ('drum'), /tof/, pl. תֻּפִּים /tupˈpim/, root ת־פ־פ
  - מָעֹז ('stronghold'), /maˈʕoz/, pl. מָעֻזִּים /maʕuzˈzim/, root ע־ז־ז

The standard spelling without niqqud for all of them except כָּל־ in construct state is with vav: כול, כולה, רוב, רובו, תוף, תופים, מעוז, מעוזים. Despite this, some people occasionally omit the vav in some of those words and spell רב, תף etc.

- Several common words are spelled with a holam haser in the Bible, but the Academy mandates that they be spelled with holam male in modern Hebrew, among them:
  - כֹּחַ/כּוֹחַ ('force'), /ˈkoaχ/
  - מֹחַ/מוֹחַ ('brain'), /ˈmoaχ/
  - יַהֲלֹם/יַהֲלוֹם ('a precious stone', in modern Hebrew 'diamond'), /jahaˈlom/
  - מְאֹד/מְאוֹד ('very'), /məʔod/
  - פִּתְאֹם/פִּתְאוֹם ('suddenly'), /pitˈʔom/
  Some people still spell them without vav, but the standard spelling is with vav.
- The participle of most verbs in binyan Qal is often written with holam haser in the Bible, but always with holam male in modern Hebrew.
  - For example, in the Bible appear both חֹזֶה and חוֹזֶה ('seer'), /χoˈze/, but in modern Hebrew only חוֹזֶה.

=== Holam with other matres lectionis ===
- The most common occasion for not writing the /o/ sound as a vav in text without niqqud is when in text with niqqud the mater lectionis is Alef (א) or He (ה) instead of vav. In the Bible some words are irregularly and inconsistently spelled with ה as a mater lectionis:
  - זֹה alongside זוֹ, e.g. בֵּיתֹה alongside בֵּיתוֹ, etc.
  but the number of these irregularities was brought to minimum in modern Hebrew.
- In the future forms of several verbs whose roots' first letter is Alef:
  - תֹּאכַל ('you shall eat'), /toˈχal/, root א־כ־ל, without niqqud תאכל.
  - The prefix of the first person singular is itself Alef and in spelling with niqqud only one Alef is written: אֹמַר ('I shall say'), /ʔoˈmaʁ/, root א־מ־ר, and in spelling without niqqud a vav is added: אומר. This always happens in the roots א־ב־ד ('perish'), א־ב־י ('wish'), א־כ־ל ('eat'), א־מ־ר ('say'), א־פ־י ('bake') and less consistently in the roots א־ה־ב ('love'), א־ח־ז ('hold'), א־ס־ף ('collect'), א־ת־י ('come'). In the root א־מ־ר a holam male with vav is used in the infinitive in Mishnaic and modern Hebrew:
  - לוֹמַר /loˈmaʁ/.
- In the infinitive form of a small number of verbs whose roots' last letter is Alef: בִּמְלֹאת ('upon becoming full'), /bimˈlot/, root מ־ל־א.
- In the following words the mater lectionis is always Alef (א):
  - זֹאת ('this' fem.), /zot/
  - לֹא ('no'), /lo/
  - מֹאזְנַיִם ('scales'), /mozˈnajim/, without niqqud מאזניים
  - נֹאד ('wineskin'), /nod/
  - צֹאן ('sheep' or 'goats'), /t͡son/
  - רֹאשׁ ('head'), /ʁoʃ/
  - שְׂמֹאל ('left'), /səmol/
- In the following words the mater lectionis is always He (ה):
  - כֹּה ('such'), /ko/
  - פֹּה ('here'), /po/
  - אֵיפֹה ('where?'), /eˈfo/
- In the absolute infinitive form of verbs which end in He: הָיֹה (/haˈjo/ 'to be'). This form is common in the Bible, but in modern Hebrew it is not productive and it is preserved only in fossilized sayings. For example, a common opening for fairy tales, הָיֹה הָיָה ('there once was'), /haˈjo haˈja/ is written היה היה without niqqud.

=== Holam without vav in personal names ===
Some examples of usage of holam without vav in personal names:

- The names Pharaoh (פַּרְעֹה, /paʁˈʕo/), Moshe (מֹשֶׁה) and Shlomo (שְׁלֹמֹה) are never written with vav. Shilo (שִׁילֹה) is sometimes written with vav in the Bible, but always with He in modern Hebrew. The adjectives פַּרְעוֹנִי, שִׁילוֹנִי are written with vav and with a nun in the suffix.
- The name Aharon (אַהֲרֹן) is spelled with holam haser in the Bible. In modern Hebrew both אהרן and אהרון are used.
- The name Noah (נֹחַ) is spelled with holam haser in the Bible, but it is sometimes written with the vav in the Mishna and in modern Hebrew.
- Several other names of places and people are spelled with holam and Alef in the Bible include Yoshiyahu (יֹאשִׁיָּהוּ, Josiah), Dor (דֹּאר, in modern Hebrew דּוֹר) and No Amon (נֹא אָמוֹן, the Hebrew name of Thebes).
- The word כֹּהֵן ('priest'), /koˈhen/ is spelled with holam haser in the Bible. It is a common Jewish last name, Cohen. The Academy mandates holam male for the noun כּוֹהֵן, but allows the omission of vav for spelling the personal name.
- Some personal names, such as Ohad (אֹהַד), Zohar (זֹהַר) and Nogah (נֹגַהּ), are sometimes spelled without vav in modern writing without niqqud, although this varies from person to person.
- God's name Adonai (אֲדֹנָי) is written with holam haser to distinguish it from the word "Lord" (אָדוֹן) used for humans. When the Tetragrammaton is written with niqqud, it follows that of Adonai, so it is written with holam haser, too. For religious reasons writing Adonai and the Tetragrammaton is avoided in modern religious texts except in direct quotes from the Bible. They rarely appear in secular modern Hebrew texts and their spelling there is inconsistent.
- The name Elohim (אֱלֹהִים) is written with holam haser in the Bible, although its singular form Eloah (אֱלוֹהַּ) is usually written with holam male. In modern Hebrew Elohim is a common word for "God" and it is usually spelled with the vav, which is also the Academy's recommendation.

== Pronunciation ==
The following table contains the pronunciation and transliteration of the different holams in reconstructed historical forms and dialects using the International Phonetic Alphabet.

The letters Pe ⟨פ⟩ and Tsade ⟨צ⟩ are used in this table only for demonstration. Any letter can be used.

Symbol	Name	Pronunciation						
Symbol	Name	Israeli	Ashkenazi	Sephardi	Yemenite	Tiberian	Reconstructed	
Symbol	Name	Israeli	Ashkenazi	Sephardi	Yemenite	Tiberian	Mishnaic	Biblical
פֹ פֹה	Holam	[o̞]	[oɪ ~ øɪ ~ eɪ ~ əʊ ~ ɐʊ ~ ɑʊ ~ oʊ]	[o̞]	[ɶ ~ ɤ ~ œ]	[o]	[o]	[aw] > [oː]
פוֹ צֹא	Holam male	[o̞]	[oɪ ~ øɪ ~ eɪ ~ əʊ ~ ɐʊ ~ ɑʊ ~ oʊ]	[o̞]	[ɶ ~ ɤ ~ œ]	[o]	[o]	[oː]

== Vowel length comparison ==
These vowel lengths are not manifested in modern Hebrew. In addition, the short o is usually promoted to a long o in Israeli writing for the sake of disambiguation. As well, the short o (qamatz qaṭan) and long a (qamatz) have the same niqqud. As a result, a qamatz qaṭan is usually promoted to Holam male in Israeli writing for the sake of disambiguation.

Vowel Length			IPA	Transliteration	English example
Long	Short	Very Short	IPA	Transliteration	English example
וֹ	ָ	ֳ	[o̞]	o	cone

== Computer encoding ==
Glyph	Unicode	Name
ֹ	U+05B9	HEBREW POINT HOLAM
ֺ	U+05BA	HEBREW POINT HOLAM HASER FOR VAV
וֹ	U+FB4B	HEBREW LETTER VAV WITH HOLAM

In Unicode there are two ways to distinguish the vowel ḥolam male and the consonant-vowel combination vav + ḥolam ḥaser. For example, in the pair מַצּוֹת (/maˈt͡sot/, the plural of מַצָּה, matza) and מִצְוֹת (/miˈt͡svot/, the plural of מִצְוָה mitzva):

1. By using the zero-width non-joiner after the vav and before the holam: מִצְו‌ֹת
2. By using the Unicode character U+05BA HEBREW POINT HOLAM HASER FOR VAV: מִצְוֺת.

The precomposed character, U+FB4B (HTML Entity (decimal) &#64331;) stands for a vav + ḥolam male, and there is no precomposed character for the vav + ḥolam ḥaser combination.

== See also ==
- Niqqud
- Combining Grapheme Joiner
