= Tzere =

Hebrew niqqud vowel sign

Tzere
ֵ
IPA	e, e̞/ɛ̝
Transliteration	e
English example	⦁ bed ⦁ bay ⦁ (Scottish) bay
Same sound	segol
Example
תֵּל
The word for mound in Hebrew, tel. The only vowel (under Tav, the two dots horizontally) is the Tzere itself.
Other Niqqud
Shva · Hiriq · Tzere · Segol · Patach · Kamatz · Holam · Dagesh · Mappiq · Shuruk · Kubutz · Rafe · Sin/Shin Dot

Tzere (also spelled Tsere, Tzeirei, Zere, Zeire, Ṣērê; modern Hebrew: צֵירֵי, IPA: [tseˈʁe], sometimes also written צירה; formerly צֵרֵי ṣērê) is a Hebrew niqqud vowel sign represented by two horizontally-aligned dots "◌ֵ" underneath a letter. In modern Hebrew, tzere is mostly pronounced the same as segol and indicates the phoneme /e̞/, which is the same as the "e" sound in the vowel segol and is transliterated as an "e". There was a distinction in Tiberian Hebrew between segol and Tzere.

== Name ==
The name comes from Aramaic/Syriac “a tearing asunder, splitting, tearing, bursting” is probably a loan translation from Arabic kasrah ⟨كَسْرَة⟩, the name of the short vowel /i/, literally “a breaking, breach”.

== Usage ==
Tzere is usually written in these cases:

- In final stressed closed syllables: מַחְשֵׁב ([maħˈʃev], computer), סִפֵּר ([sipˈpeʁ], he told; without niqqud סיפר). Also in final syllables closed by guttural letters with an added furtive patach: מַטְבֵּעַ ([matˈbeaʕ], coin), שוֹכֵחַ ([ʃoˈχeaħ], forgetting). Notable exceptions to this rule are:
  - The personal suffixes ־תֶם ([tem], 2 pl. m.), ־תֶן ([ten], 2 pl. f.), ־כֶם ([χem], 2 pl. m.), ־כֶן ([χen], 2 pl. f.), ־הֶם ([hem], 3 pl. m.), ־הֶן ([hen], 3 pl. f.) are written with segol. (But the words הֵם ([hem], they m.), הֵן ([hen], they f.) are written with Tzere.)
  - The words אֱמֶת ([eˈmet], truth), בַּרְזֶל ([baʁˈzel], iron), גַּרְזֶן ([ɡaʁˈzen], axe), כַּרְמֶל ([kaʁˈmel], Carmel, gardenland), עֲרָפֶל ([ʕaʁaˈfel], fog) are written with segol.
  - The word בֵּן ([ben], son, boy) is written with tzere in the absolute state, but with segol in the construct state: בֶּן־. In the Bible this rule also applies to other words which end in tzere, when they are written with maqaf.
- In non-final, unstressed open syllables: עֵנָב ([ʕeˈnav], grape), תֵּבָה ([teˈva], chest, ark; without niqqud תיבה).
- In the first (stressed) syllable of about 70 segolate words, among them חֵלֶק ([ˈħeleq], part), סֵפֶר ([ˈsefeʁ], book), עֵדֶן ([ˈʕeden], Eden). In other – much more numerous – segolate words the first [e] sound is a segol.
- In final open syllables, when the mater lectionis is yod (י) or aleph (א): בְּנֵי־ ([bəne], sons of), מוֹצֵא ([moˈtse], finding). When the mater lectionis is he (ה), the vowel sign is usually segol, but tzere is written in the imperative and absolute infinitive forms of the verb, in nouns in construct state, and in the base form of several other nouns (see below for details).

In declension tzere sometimes changes to other vowels or to shva. The full rules for these changes were formulated the Academy of the Hebrew Language.

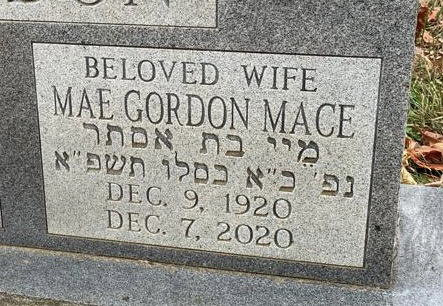
An uncommon use of Tzere on a tomb in the U.S. state of Maryland. Name in question would have been likely to be mispronounced in the absence of vocalization

In modern Hebrew there are words which are homophones and homographs in spelling without niqqud, but are written differently with niqqud, the difference being segol and tzere. For example, עֶרֶב evening and עֵרֶב weft are both pronounced [ˈʕeʁev] and written ערב without niqqud (these words also have different etymology).

== Writing tzere with and without matres lectionis ==
Tzere can be written with and without matres lectionis. The most prominent mater lectionis for tzere is Yod (י), and in some cases it is used with the letters aleph (א) and he (ה).

Standard spelling rules mandate only one way to spell every word with or without the Yod after tzere. Although in standard modern pronunciation the sound of tzere with or without the Yod is the same, it may change the word's meaning in a written text (see below).

=== Standard usage without Yod ===
Tzere can be written by itself without mater lectionis, in which case it is called tzere ḥaser ("lacking tzere"), for example in the word זֵר ([zeɾ], wreath). In this case, in text without niqqud the vowel [e] is usually not written at all: זר. This word can be also vocalized as זָר ([zaɾ], stranger) and the reader has to guess the right pronunciation according to the context. According to the standardized Hebrew spelling the letter Yod is sometimes written in texts without niqqud, when there is a grammatical reason for it; for example, the verb תֵּעָדֵר ([teʕaˈdeɾ], she will be absent) is written without Yod in texts with niqqud, but the Yod is written in a text without niqqud: תיעדר.

=== Standard usage with Yod ===
Tzere with Yod is called "full tzere". When a full tzere is written in text with niqqud, the letter Yod must be written in text without niqqud. The main cases for writing the tzere with Yod are these:

- Tzere is written with Yod to indicate the plural number of declined words, for example מוּצָרֵנוּ means our product and מוּצָרֵינוּ means our products; the standard pronunciation is the same: [mutsaˈɾenu].
- Tzere is written with Yod in words in which the Yod is a part of the root:
  - Nouns, for example בֵּיצָה ([beˈtsa], egg), root ב־י־צ; זֵיתִים ([zeˈtim], olives, the plural of זַיִת), root ז־י־ת, מֵידָע ([meˈdaʕ], information), root י־ד־ע. Tzere is also traditionally written with Yod in several other words, the roots of which are rarely used productively to form other words, among them פְּסֵיפָס ([pəseˈfas], mosaic), קֵיסָם ([qeˈsam], sliver) and the word "tzere" itself – צֵירֵי ([tseˈɾe]).
  - Verbs, in which the last letter of the root is he (ל״ה), which is by convention treated as interchangeable with Yod, for example נִבְנֵית ([nivˈnet], being built f.), root ב־נ־ה (or ב־נ־י). In Arabic the corresponding verbs are written with ʾalif maqṣūra, which represents a similar interchange of the letters yāʾ (ي) and ʾalif (ا).
  - Some verbs in which the first letter of the root is Yod (פ״י), for example הֵיטִיב ([heˈtiv], he did well), root י־ט־ב.
- In standard spelling without niqqud Yod is written to represent the [e] sound in words formed in the pattern heCCeC (הֶקְטֵל), in which the first and the second consonants of the root merge, even though the vowel there is not tzere, but seggol, for example הֶשֵּׂג ([hesˈseɡ], achievement; root נ־שׂ־ג, without niqqud הישג).

=== Nonstandard usage of Yod to represent tzere ===
In texts with full niqqud – mostly poetry, religious and children books – tzere is usually written in accordance with the rules mandated by the academy. The academy defined some cases in which a Yod is added to texts without niqqud to signify an [e] sound, but in common usage Yod is often written or not written contrary to the standard.

Some notable common deviations from the standard in which a Yod is added include:

- Some words are often written with Yod in texts without niqqud, even though the Yod is not a part of the root and is not written in a text with niqqud. For example: מֵמַד ([meˈmad], dimension), מֵרַב ([meˈɾav], Merab, most), שֵׂעָר ([seˈʕaɾ], hair) are often written מימד, מירב, and שיער, even though the standard spelling without niqqud is ממד, מרב, שער. This goes further as the Yod is retained in declined forms of the word, which aren't written with tzere at all, but with shva; for example, the word שְׂעָרוֹת ([seʕaˈɾot], hairs) is frequently written שיערות, although the vowel of the ש is shva (the standard spelling is שערות).
- Words in the pattern CəCeCa (קְטֵלָה) are often written with a Yod, even though it is not the standard. Examples include בְּרֵכָה ([bəɾeˈχa], pool), גְּנֵבָה ([ɡəneˈva], theft), שְׂרֵפָה ([səɾeˈfa], burning), which are often written בריכה, גניבה, שריפה instead of the standard ברכה, גנבה, שרפה.
- Yod is often added in texts without niqqud to represent tzere in the future tense of verbs in which Yod is the first letter of the root, for example יֵשֵׁב ([jeˈʃev], he will sit) is often written יישב, although the standard spelling is ישב. This spelling may also be vocalized יָשַׁב ([jaˈʃav], he sat), but adding a Yod doesn't solve the ambiguity – יישב may be vocalized יְיַשֵׁב ([jeˈjaʃev], he will settle) and יִשֵׁב ([jiˈʃev], he settled). Because of the many potential ambiguities, the academy suggests adding vocalization in such cases.
- Several other (non-comprehensive) examples:
  - The standard spelling of the plural form of the word פְּרִי ([pəɾi], fruit) is פֵּרוֹת ([peɾot]) with niqqud and פרות without niqqud, but it is often written פירות (פרות may also mean פָּרוֹת [paˈɾot] cows).
  - The words אֵזוֹר ([eˈzoɾ], zone), הֵפֶךְ ([ˈhefeχ], contrary; also הֶפֶךְ), תֵּכֶף ([ˈteχef], immediately; also תֶּכֶף) are sometimes spelled איזור, היפך, תיכף, although the standard spelling without niqqud is אזור, הפך, תכף. (In the Even-Shoshan dictionary תיכף refers to תֶּכֶף; in the Rav-Millim dictionary it is the main entry.)

Some notable common deviations from the standard in which a Yod is not written include:

- According to the modern spelling rules, the academy mandates writing a Yod in some cases in which the vowel [i] changes to [e] for grammatical reasons. (Not writing the Yod is correct according to the old ktiv haser spelling.) For example:
  - In the future, imperative and infinitive forms of verbs in binyan nif'al, the vowel of the prefix is usually [i], which in standard spelling without niqqud is written with a Yod: לְהִזָּהֵר ([ləhizzaˈheɾ], to be cautious), standard spelling without niqqud: להיזהר. This vowel changes to [e] before the guttural letters א, ה, ח, ע, ר: לְהֵרָדֵם ([ləheɾaˈdem], to fall asleep), standard spelling without niqqud: להירדם. Sometimes, however, verbs with both [i] and [e] are written without a Yod in texts without niqqud: להזהר, להרדם.
  - In nouns of the pattern CiCCuC, such as סִפּוּק ([sipˈpuq], satisfaction, without niqqud סיפוק) the vowel [i] also changes to [e] before guttural letters: פֵּרוּשׁ ([peˈɾuʃ], commentary), תֵּאוּר ([teˈʔuɾ], description), without niqqud: פירוש, תיאור, but sometimes פרוש, תאור.
- The Yod is sometimes omitted from words, the last letter of whose root is ה. This is a mistake, because in these verbs the Yod is written in texts with niqqud. For example: הוֹדֵיתִי ([hoˈdeti], I thanked, root י־ד־ה), נֶהֱנֵינוּ ([neheˈnenu], we enjoyed, root ה־נ־ה) are sometimes incorrectly spelled הודתי, נהננו.

=== Tzere with aleph and he ===
The letter aleph (א) is the mater lectionis after tzere in the middle or the end of the word when it is a part of the root: מוֹצֵא ([moˈtse], finding m.), מוֹצֵאת ([moˈtset], finding f.).

The letter he (ה) is very rarely used as a mater lectionis for [e] in the middle of the word. The notable example for this is the word יְפֵהפִיָּה ([jəfefiˈja], pretty), in which the two last letters of the root (י־פ־ה) are reduplicated. It can also be spelled יפה־פיה (fem.; so in the Bible, Jeremiah 46:20) or יפיפיה.

The letter he (ה) is often used as a mater lectionis for the vowel [e] in the end of the word, but the niqqud is usually segol. It is tzere in these cases:

- In the construct state of nouns: absolute state שָׂדֶה ([saˈde], field), but construct state שְׂדֵה־ ([səde]).
- In the imperative and absolute infinitive forms of the verb: future form יְגַלֶּה ([jəɡalˈle], he will discover), but גַּלֵּה ([ɡalˈle], discover!); future form תַּרְבֶּה ([taɾˈbe], she shall increase, make many), absolute infinitive הַרְבֵּה ([haɾˈbe], many).
- In some words, among them אַיֵּה ([ajˈje], where?), אַרְיֵה ([aɾˈje], lion), הִנֵּה ([hinˈne], here!), יָשְׁפֵה ([jaʃəˈfe], jasper; also יָשְׁפֶה), ־עֶשְׂרֵה ([ʕesˈre], -teen f.).

== Pronunciation ==
The following table contains the pronunciation and transliteration of the different tzeres in reconstructed historical forms and dialects using the International Phonetic Alphabet.

The letter Bet ⟨ב⟩ used in this table is only for demonstration, any letter can be used.

Symbol	Name	Pronunciation							
Symbol	Name	Israeli	Ashkenazi		Sephardi	Yemenite	Tiberian	Reconstructed	
Symbol	Name	Israeli	Northern	Southern	Sephardi	Yemenite	Tiberian	Mishnaic	Biblical
בֵ	Tzere	[e̞]	[ej]	[aj]	[e̞]	[e̞]	[e]	?	[eː]
בֵי, בֵה, בֵא	Tzere Mālē	[e̞]	[ej]	[aj]	[e̞]	[e̞]	[e]	?	[eː]

In Modern Hebrew tzere – with or without a following yod – may be pronounced as [ej] and transliterated as "ei or "ey". Such pronunciation and transliteration of tzere are not correct in the normative pronunciation and not consistent in the spoken language.

== Unicode encoding ==
Glyph	Unicode	Name
ֵ	U+05B5	HEBREW POINT TSERE

== See also ==
- Niqqud
- Segol
