= Kamatz =

Hebrew niqqud vowel sign

Kamatz
ָ
IPA	[ä]
Transliteration	a
English approximation	spa
Similar sound	patach
Example
דָּג
The word for fish in Hebrew, dag. The only vowel (under Dalet, the two perpendicular lines) is a kamatz.
Other Niqqud
Shwa · Hiriq · Tzere · Segol · Patach · Kamatz · Holam · Dagesh · Mappiq · Shuruk · Kubutz · Rafe · Sin/Shin Dot

Kamatz or qamatz (Modern Hebrew: קָמָץ, IPA: [kaˈmats]; alternatively קָמֶץ qāmeṣ) is a Hebrew niqqud (vowel) sign represented by two perpendicular lines (looking like an uppercase T) ⟨ ָ ⟩ underneath a letter. In modern Hebrew, it usually indicates the phoneme /a/ which is the "a" sound in the word spa and is transliterated as a. In these cases, its sound is identical to the sound of pataḥ in modern Hebrew. In a minority of cases it indicates the phoneme /o/, equal to the sound of ḥolam. In traditional Ashkenazi Hebrew pronunciation, kamatz is pronounced as the phoneme /ɔ/, which becomes /u/ in some contexts in southern Ashkenazi dialects. For this reason, the equivalent phoneme in Yiddish (/ɔ/ in some dialects, /u/ in others) is spelled with an aleph marked with a kamatz ⟨אָ⟩, in Yiddish orthography.

== Etymology ==
The kamatz name comes from the verb קָמַץ kamáts 'to clench, to tighten' (used in cases like clenching fists or tightening lips), because the vowel's original pronunciation in the Tiberian system, between the [o] and [a] sounds, requires the lips to be tightened.

== Overview ==
=== Kamatz katan and Kamatz gadol ===
Biblical Hebrew	Tiberian phoneme	Tiberian vowel	Babylonian phoneme	Modern Hebrew
/a/	[a]	Patach	[a]	Patach
/aː/	[ɔ]	Kamatz	[a]	Kamatz gadol
/o/	[ɔ]	Kamatz	[o]	Kamatz katan
/oː/	[o]	Holam	[o]	Holam

The Hebrew of the late centuries BCE and early centuries of the Common Era had a system with five phonemic long vowels /aː eː iː oː uː/ and five short vowels /a e i o u/.

In the later dialects of the 1st millennium CE, phonemic vowel length disappeared, and instead was automatically determined by the context, with vowels pronounced long in open syllables and short in closed ones. However, the previous vowel phonemes merged in various ways that differed from dialect to dialect:

- In Tiberian Hebrew, which underlies the written system of vowels, short /a/ became [a] (indicated by patach); long /oː/ became [o] (indicated by holam); while /aː/ and /o/ both merged into an in-between sound [ɔ] (similar to the vowel in English "caught" without the cot-caught merger), which was indicated by kamatz.
- In the Babylonian vocalization, however, short and long variants simply merged, with /a/ and /aː/ becoming [a], while /o/ and /oː/ became [o]; and this system underlies the pronunciation of Modern Hebrew.

The result is that in Modern Hebrew, the vowel written with kamatz might be pronounced as either [a] or [o], depending on historical origin. It is often said that the two sounds can be distinguished by context:

- The kamatz sound of [o], known as kamatz katan (Hebrew: קָמַץ קָטָן, IPA: [kaˈmats kaˈtan], 'little kamatz') occurs in a closed syllable, i.e. one which ends in a consonant marked with a shwa nakh (zero vowel) or with a dagesh ḥazaq (which indicates that the consonant was pronounced geminated, i.e. doubled);
- The kamatz sound of [a], known as kamatz gadol (Hebrew: קָמַץ גָּדוֹל [kaˈmats ɡaˈdol], 'big kamatz') occurs in an open syllable, i.e. any other circumstance: one which ends in a consonant followed by a normal vowel, a consonant at the end of a word and with no vowel marking, or a consonant marked with a shwa na (originally pronounced [ə]).

Unfortunately, the two varieties of shwa are written identically, and pronounced identically in Modern Hebrew; as a result, there is no reliable way to distinguish the two varieties of kamatz when followed by a vowel marked with a shwa. (In some cases, Biblical texts are marked with a metheg or other cantillation mark that helps to indicate which pronunciation is intended, but this usage is not consistent, and in any case such marks are absent in non-Biblical texts.) It should also be noted that there are examples of kamatz katan appearing in open syllables, such as in the plural of שֹׁרֶשׁ ([ˈʃo.ʁɛʃ], 'root'), שׇׁרָשִׁים ([ʃo.ʁa.ˈʃim]).

An example of the kamatz katan is the Modern Hebrew word תׇּכְנִית ([toχˈnit], "program").

According to the standard Hebrew spelling rules as published by the Academy of the Hebrew Language, words which have a kamatz katan in their base form must be written without a vav, hence the standard vowel-less spelling of תׇּכְנִית is תכנית. In practice, however, Modern Hebrew words containing a kamatz katan do add a vav ⟨ו⟩ to indicate the [o] pronunciation; hence the nonstandard (also termed "excessive") spelling תוכנית is common in newspapers and is even used in several dictionaries, for example Rav Milim. Words which in their base form have a ḥolam that changes to kamatz katan in declension retain the vav in vowel-less spelling: the noun חֹפֶשׁ ([ˈχofeʃ], "freedom") is spelled חופש in vowel-less texts; the adjective חָפְשִׁי ([χofˈʃi], "free") is spelled חופשי in vowel-less text, despite the use of kamatz katan, both according to the standard spelling and in common practice.

Some books print the kamatz katan differently, although the way in which they do is not consistent. For example, in siddur Rinat Yisrael the vertical line of kamatz katan is longer. In Siddur Sim Shalom, the horizontal line is separated from the bottom. In a book of Psalms used by some Breslov hassidim the kamatz katan is bolder. In the popular niqqud textbook Niqqud halakha le-maase by Nisan Netser, the kamatz katan is printed as an encircled kamatz for didactic purposes.

Unicode defines the code point U+05C7 ׇ HEBREW POINT QAMATS QATAN, although its usage is not required.

=== Hataf kamatz ===
Hataf kamatz (Hebrew: חֲטַף קָמַץ, IPA: [χaˈtaf kaˈmats]) is a "reduced kamatz". Like kamatz katan, it is pronounced [o], but the rationale for its usage is different: it replaces the shva on letters which require a shva according to the grammar, but where the traditional pronunciation is [o]. This mostly happens with gutturals, for example in אֳרָנִים ([oʁaˈnim], "pines", the plural form of אֹרֶן, [ˈoʁen]), but occasionally also on other letters, for example שֳׁרָשִׁים ([ʃoʁaˈʃim], "roots", another plural of שֹׁרֶשׁ [ˈʃoʁeʃ]); and צִפֳּרִים ([tsipoˈʁim], "birds", the plural of צִפּוֹר ([tsiˈpoʁ]).

== Pronunciation and transliteration ==
The following table contains the pronunciation and transliteration of the different kamatz forms in reconstructed historical forms and dialects using the International Phonetic Alphabet. The transcription in IPA is above and the transliteration is below.

The letters Bet ⟨ב⟩ and Het ⟨ח⟩ used in this table are only for demonstration, any letter can be used.

Symbol		Name	English	Pronunciation						
Symbol		Name	English	Modern	Ashkenazi	Sephardi	Yemenite	Tiberian	Reconstructed	
Symbol		Name	English	Modern	Ashkenazi	Sephardi	Yemenite	Tiberian	Mishnaic	Biblical
בָ		Kamatz gadol	Big kamatz	[ä]	[ɔ~u]	[ä]	[ɔ]	[ɔ]	?	[aː]
בָ		Kamatz gadol	Big kamatz	a	o, u	a	o	ā	?	ā
בָה	בָא	Kamatz male	Full kamatz	[ä]	[ɔ~u]	[ä]	[ɔ]	[ɔ]	?	[ɐː]
בָה	בָא	Kamatz male	Full kamatz	a	o, u	a	o	â	?	a
בׇ		Kamatz katan	Little kamatz	[o̞]	[ɔ]	[o̞]	[ɔ]	[ɔ]	?	[ʊ]
בׇ		Kamatz katan	Little kamatz	o	o	o	o	o	?	u
חֳ		Hataf kamatz	Reduced kamatz	[o̞]	[ɔ]	[o̞]	[ɔ]	[ɔ̆]	?	[ɔ̝]
חֳ		Hataf kamatz	Reduced kamatz	o	o	o	o	ŏ	?	u

== Vowel length comparison ==
These vowel lengths are not manifested in Modern Hebrew. The short o (kamatz katan) and long a (kamatz) have the same niqqud. Because of this, the short o (kamatz katan) is usually promoted to a long o (holam male) in Israeli writing, written as a vav ⟨ו⟩, for the sake of disambiguation.

By adding two vertical dots (shva) the vowel is made very short.

Vowel comparison table
Vowel length			IPA	Transliteration	English approximation
Long	Short	Very Short	IPA	Transliteration	English approximation
ָ	ַ	ֲ	[a]	a	spa
Kamatz	Patach	Reduced patach	[a]	a	spa
וֹ	ׇ	ֳ	[o]	o	core
Holam	Kamatz katan	Reduced kamatz	[o]	o	core

== Unicode encoding ==
Glyph	Unicode	Name
ָ	U+05B8	QAMATS
ֳ	U+05B3	HATAF QAMATS
ׇ	U+05C7	QAMATS QATAN

Note: the glyph for QAMATS QATAN may appear empty or incorrect if one applies a font that cannot handle the glyph necessary to represent Unicode character U+05C7. Usually this Unicode character isn't used and is substituted with the similar looking QAMATS (U+05B8).

== Literature ==
Blau, Joshua (2010). Phonology and Morphology of Biblical Hebrew. ISBN 978-1-57506-129-0.
