= Romanization of Hebrew =

Transcription of Hebrew into the Latin alphabet

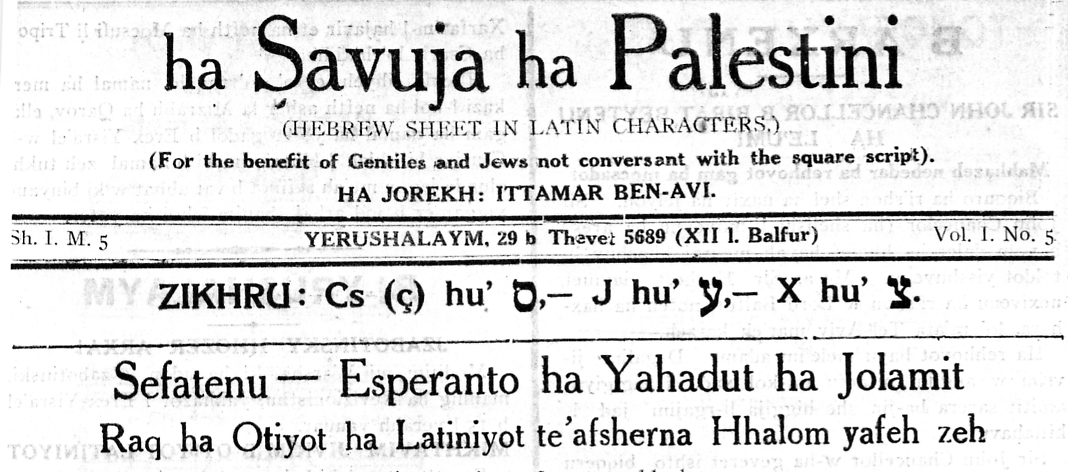
The front page of the Romanized Hebrew newspaper Ha-Savuja Ha-Palestini, showing parts of the Romanization method by Itamar Ben-Avi, 1929

The Hebrew language uses the Hebrew alphabet with optional vowel diacritics. The Romanization of Hebrew refers specifically to the use of the Latin alphabet to represent Hebrew words. For example, the Hebrew name יִשְׂרָאֵל ('Israel') can be Romanized as Yisrael or Yiśrāʼēl in addition to Israel.

Particularly in contexts where the Latin alphabet is the dominant writing system, Romanization and transliteration are often used interchangeably. The actual relationship between the two terms is dependent on the discipline and/or context. However, generally speaking, one can safely define transliteration as the representation of words from one script in a different script. Romanization is a subset of transliteration, specifically referring to the representation of non-Latin or vernacular scripts in the Latin writing system. Transliteration and Romanization can—but do not necessarily—account for vowels even for abjads as Hebrew.

== Transliteration ==
Transliteration assumes two different script systems. Transliteration of a foreign word into another language is usually the exception to translation, and often occurs when there is something distinctive about the word in the original language, such as a double entendre, uniqueness, religious, cultural or political significance, or it may add local flavor. Many Hebrew words have a long history of transliteration, for example Amen, Satan, ephod, Urim and Thummim have traditionally been transliterated, not translated. These terms were in many cases also first transliterated into Greek and Latin before English. (See also Transliteration of Greek into English)

Different publishers have different transliteration policies.

There are various transliteration standards or systems for Hebrew-to-English; no one system has significant common usage across all fields. Consequently, in general usage there are often no hard and fast rules in Hebrew-to-English transliteration, and many transliterations are an approximation due to a lack of equivalence between the English and Hebrew alphabets. Conflicting systems of transliteration often appear in the same text, as certain Hebrew words tend to associate with certain traditions of transliteration. For example,

For Hanukkah at the synagogue Beith Sheer Chayyim, Isaac donned his talis that Yitzchak sent him from Bet Qehila in Tsfat, Israel.

This text includes instances of the same word transliterated in different ways: The Hebrew word בית is transliterated as both Beith and Bet.

These discrepancies in transliterations of the same word can be traced to discrepancies in the transliterations of individual Hebrew letters, reflecting not only different traditions of transliteration into different languages that use Latin alphabets, but also the fact that different pronunciation styles exist for the same letters in Hebrew itself (e.g. mainstream secular pronunciations used in the media versus Mizrahi, Arab, or Orthodox Ashkenazi colloquial pronunciations). For example, Hanukkah and Chayyim are transliterated with different initial letter combinations, although in Hebrew both begin with the letter ח; the use of ⟨ch⟩ reflects German or Yiddish influence and pronunciation (e.g. [x] or [χ]), whereas the ⟨h⟩ or ⟨ḥ⟩ may indicate a softer pronunciation of ח as in ancient Hebrew, Judeo-Arabic or Mizrahi Hebrew (e.g. [h] or [ħ]). Similarly:

- ת is transliterated as ⟨th⟩ in Beith, ⟨s⟩ in talis (as in Ashkenazi Hebrew), and ⟨t⟩ in Bet (as in Sephardi Hebrew)
- ק is transliterated as ⟨c⟩ in Isaac, ⟨k⟩ in Yitzchak, and ⟨q⟩ in Qehila
- צ is transliterated as ⟨s⟩ in Isaac, ⟨tz⟩ in Yitzchak, and ⟨ts⟩ in Tsfat

These inconsistencies make it more difficult for the non-Hebrew-speaking reader to recognize related word forms, or even to properly pronounce the Hebrew words thus transliterated.

== Historic instances ==
Early Romanization of Hebrew occurred with the contact between the Romans and the Jews. It was influenced by earlier transliteration into the Greek language. For example, the name of the Roman province of Iudaea (63 BCE) was apparently derived from the Greek words Ἰούδα (Iouda) and Ἰουδαία (Ioudaia). These words can be seen in Chapter 1 of Esdras (Ezra) in the Septuagint, a Hellenistic translation of the Hebrew Bible into Greek. The Greek words in turn are transliterations of the Hebrew word יהודה (Yehuda) that was anglicized as the names Judah, Judas and Jude.

In the 1st century, Satire 14:96 of Juvenal uses the Hebraic words sabbata, Iudaicum, and Moyses, apparently adapted from the Greek.

The 4th-century and 5th-century Latin translations of the Hebrew Bible romanize its proper names. The familiar Biblical names in English are derived from these romanizations. The Vulgate, of the early 5th century, is considered the first direct Latin translation of the Hebrew Bible. Apart from names, another term that the Vulgate Romanizes is the technical term mamzer (ממזר).

With the rise of Zionism, some Jews promoted the use of romanization instead of Hebrew script in hopes of helping more people learn Hebrew. One such promoter was Itamar Ben-Zion Ben-Yehuda, better known as Itamar Ben-Avi. His father, Eliezer Ben Yehuda, raised him to be the first modern native speaker of Hebrew. In 1927, Ben-Avi published the biography Avi in Romanized Hebrew (now listed in the online catalog of the Jewish National and University Library). However, the innovation did not catch on.

Political activist Ze'ev Jabotinsky, leader of right-wing Betar, and Chief Rabbi Kook (for secular words), also expressed their support for the reform of Hebrew script using Latin letters.

== Modern uses ==
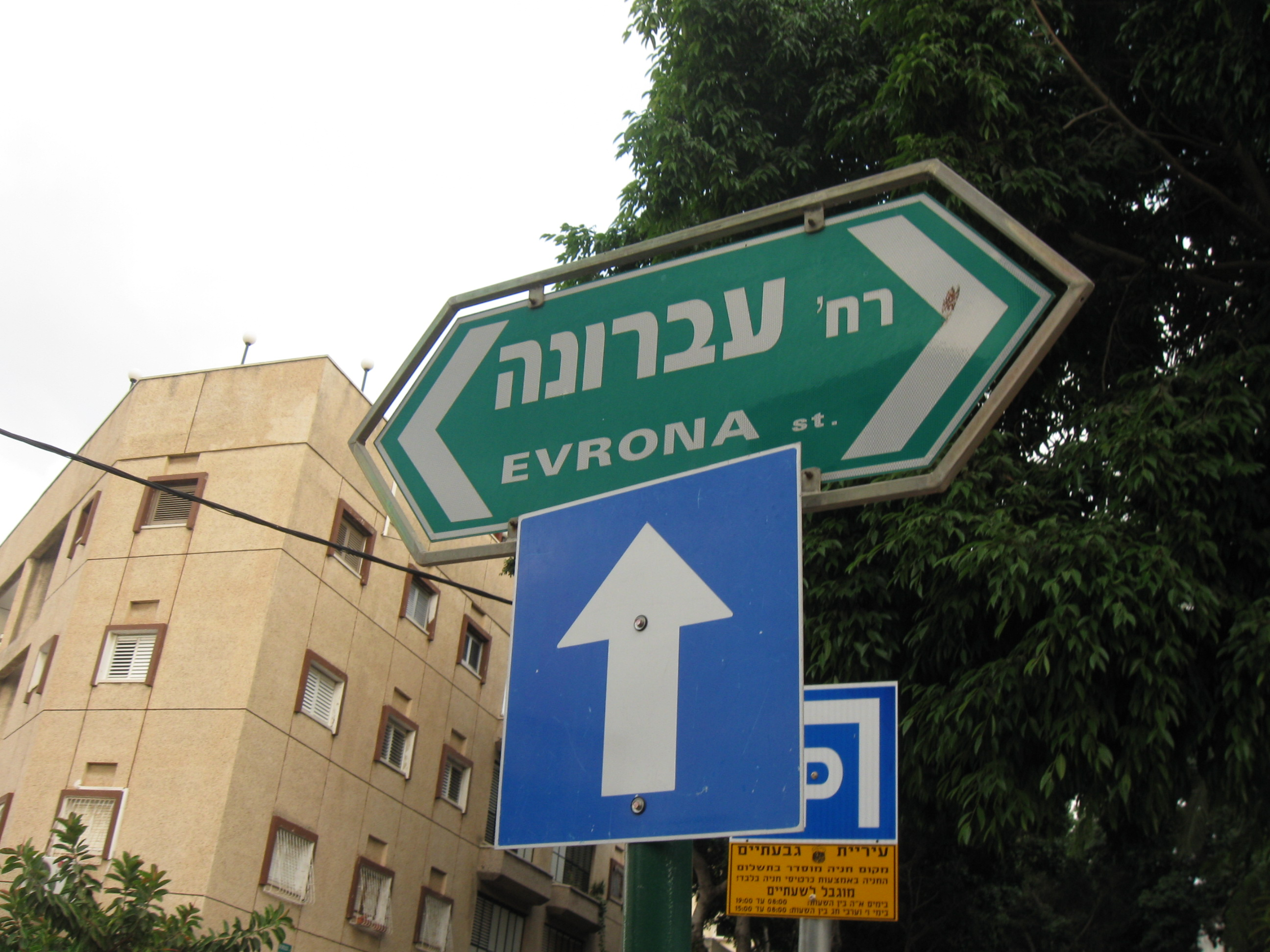
Street sign in Israel written in Hebrew, with romanization of a name (and translation of רח׳)

Romanized Hebrew can be used to present Hebrew terminology or text to anyone who is not familiar with the Hebrew script. Many Jewish prayer books in the diaspora include supplementary romanization for some or all of the Hebrew-language congregational prayers.

Romanized Hebrew is also used for Hebrew-language items in library catalogs and Hebrew-language place names on maps. In Israel, most catalogs and maps use the Hebrew script, but Romanized maps are easily available and road signs include Romanized names. Some Hebrew speakers use romanization to communicate when using internet systems that have poor support for the Hebrew alphabet. Frequently, Romanized Hebrew is also used in music scores, in part because music is written left-to-right and Hebrew is written right-to-left.

Standard romanizations exist for these various purposes. However, non-standard romanization is widely seen, even on some Israeli street signs. The standards are not generally taught outside of their specific organizations and disciplines.

== Standards ==
- Traditional, scholarly: ISO 259:1984; ISO 259-2:1994 (simplified); Society of Biblical Literature (SBL) Handbook of Style
- National: for example:
  - Rules of Transcription: Romanization of Hebrew. Academy of the Hebrew Language, 1957. Updated and augmented with a simplified version, 2000. Replaced by a new system altogether in 2006.
  - DIN 31636, the German standard.
  - Standard of Poland «Polska Norma "Transliteracja alfabetu hebrajskiego PN-74 / N-01211"», similar to SBL.
- Artscroll § Transliteration system
- Bibliographic data: ANSI Z39.25-1975; ALA/LC Romanization Tables (1991) and their book Hebraica Cataloging (1987), with Encyclopaedia Judaica (1972–1993) as an authority on names and common terms. Library of Congress Authorities is an online database that records and sources the forms of subjects, names, and titles that the Library of Congress uses.
- Geographic names: BGN/PCGN 1962 (US and UK), approximately equivalent to UNGEGN 1977 (United Nations), as both are based on the Academy of the Hebrew Language recommendations. However, BGN provides more and somewhat different specific recommendations. The GEONet Names Server is an authoritative online database that lists BGN names and assists with font character availability and conventional forms of names.
- Phonemic: ISO/FDIS 259-3:1999 (not an adopted standard)

== Comparative table ==
The following table is a breakdown of each letter in the Hebrew alphabet, describing its name or names, and its Latin script transliteration values used in academic work. If two glyphs are shown for a consonant, then the left-most glyph is the final form of the letter (or right-most glyph if your browser does not support right-to-left text layout). The conventions here are ISO 259, the UNGEGN system based on the old-fashioned Hebrew Academy system, and the modern common informal Israeli transcription. In addition, an International Phonetic Alphabet pronunciation is indicated—historical (Tiberian vocalization) for ISO 259, prescribed for Hebrew Academy, and in practice for Israeli. For the vowels further down, the letters ח and ט are used as symbolic anchors for vowel symbols, but should otherwise be ignored.

For the letters בּ גּ דּ כּ פּ תּ with dagesh in ISO 259 Classical Hebrew and by the Hebrew Academy standard, they are transcribed as single graphemes (b g d k p t) at the beginnings of words, after other consonants, and after shewa ⟨◌ְ⟩ or ẖatafim ⟨◌ֱ ◌ֲ ◌ֳ⟩. In almost every other situation, they are transcribed as double letters (bb gg dd kk pp tt). This does not apply to common Israeli Hebrew transliteration, where there are no double consonants.

The letters א ה at the ends of words without additional niqqud are silent and not transliterated. The letter ו at the end of a word with ẖolam ⟨◌ֹ⟩ is also silent and not transliterated. The letter י at the end of a word after ẖiriq ⟨◌ִ⟩ is also silent and not transliterated. The situation of the letter י at the end of a word after ẕere ⟨◌ֵ⟩ or seggol ⟨◌ֶ⟩ is more complicated, as they are silent in Classical Hebrew and in Hebrew Academy prescription and not transliterated in those systems, but they form diphthongs (ei) in Israeli Hebrew—see the vowels and diphthongs sections further down. In any event, the shewa naẖ is placed between two adjacent consonants in all situations; if there is not even a shewa naẖ between consonants, then the first of the two consonants is silent and not transliterated—this is usually one of א ו י, but even occasionally ה and rarely ש (in the name יִשָּׂשכָר Issachar) are encountered silent in this fashion. In Israeli Hebrew transcription, a vowel before yud at the end of a word or before yud then shewa naẖ inside a word, is transcribed as a diphthong (ai oi ui)—see the diphthongs section further down.

In Classical Hebrew transliteration, vowels can be long (gāḏōl), short (qāṭān) or ultra short (ḥăṭep̄), and are transliterated as such. Ultra short vowels are always one of šəwā nāʻ ⟨◌ְ⟩, ḥăṭep̄ səḡōl ⟨◌ֱ⟩, ḥăṭep̄ páṯaḥ ⟨◌ֲ⟩; or ḥăṭep̄ qāmeṣ ⟨◌ֳ⟩. Šəwā ⟨◌ְ⟩ is always šəwā nāʻ (pronounced) if it is immediately after the word's first consonant, or after a consonant after a long vowel and before another pronounced consonant—otherwise, šəwā is realized as šəwā nāḥ (silent). The vowels ṣērē ⟨◌ֵ⟩ and ḥōlem ⟨◌ֹ⟩ are always long in all situations. The vowels ḥīreq ⟨◌ִ⟩, səḡōl ⟨◌ֶ⟩, páṯaḥ ⟨◌ַ⟩, qāmeṣ ⟨◌ָ⟩, qibbūṣ ⟨◌ֻ⟩ and šūreq וּ are always long if they are the stressed syllable, or if they are in a syllable before only one consonant and another vowel, and in these cases they are transliterated as long. If they are unstressed and before a double consonant or a consonant cluster, or in the word's final unstressed syllable, then they are always short and transliterated as short. But if a vowel carries an accent ⟨◌֫⟩ or a meteg ⟨◌ֽ⟩, then it is always long—a meteg in particular is often used in places where a vowel is long but not necessarily the word's stressed syllable. Lastly, there are exceptional circumstances when long vowels—even ṣērē and ḥōlem—may not force a following šəwā to become šəwā nāʻ, including for example names such as גֵּרְשֹׁם Gēršōm (not Gērəšōm as it might seem), בֵּלְשַׁאצַּר Bēlšaṣṣạr (not Bēləšaṣṣạr) and צִֽקְלַג Ṣīqlạḡ (not Ṣīqəlạḡ). Some of these seem to be learned exceptions, and most words under the same circumstances have šəwā nāʻ as expected, such as נָֽצְרַת Nāṣərạṯ (not Nāṣrạṯ). (This is all moot in Israeli Hebrew, where, as already mentioned, shva nach tends to opportunistically replace shva na where comfortable, so נָֽצְרַת is Natzrat not Natzerat, etc.)

For the vowel qamaẕ ⟨◌ָ⟩, whether the vowel is long or short in Classical Hebrew affects the pronunciation in Academy or Israeli Hebrew, even though vowel length is not phonemic in those systems, and the difference is transliterated accordingly. Qamaẕ qatan when short is /o/, except when at the end of a word when not before a final consonant, in which case it is /a/. Qamaẕ gadol is usually /a/, but in rare situations in Classical Hebrew it can be treated as a long open /ọ/, which although pronounced identically to /ā/ (both were [ɔː]), this a/o distinction is clearly made in the pronunciation of Academy and Israeli Hebrew, and is thus transliterated.

If any word ends with one of הַּ חַ עַ, then the vowel pataẖ is pronounced before the consonant, not after as it is written, and so the transliterated sequence is ⟨ah⟩, ⟨aẖ⟩, ⟨aʻ⟩, etc.

In certain rare words that are meant to begin with two consecutive consonants even in Classical Hebrew, an invisible səḡōl qāṭān vowel is pronounced before the two consonants in Classical Hebrew and is so transcribed, because Classical words may not begin with more than one consonant. This rule does not apply to Academy and Israeli Hebrew, where consonant clusters are more tolerated. For example, the word שְׁתַּ֫יִם ("two") would appear as štáyim, but is actually ʼeštáyim. However, it remains simply shtayim in Academy and Israeli Hebrew.

In 2006, the Hebrew Academy replaced their 1953 transliteration rules with new rules, and these were adopted as a United Nations standard in 2007. As of 2008, migration to the new transliteration standard is still underway, and many signs and documents still use the 1953 conventions. The new 2006 rules attempt to more closely follow Israeli Hebrew vowel habits (such as the collapse of many shva na), but stop short of adopting most of the informal transliteration patterns. It still transliterates the diphthong [e̞j] as ⟨e⟩, and it still transliterates separate ⟨ẖ⟩ and ⟨kh⟩ in all cases. It is unspecific about rules governing the transliteration of phonemes not traditionally native to Hebrew.

Comparison of Hebrew transliteration standards
Symbol	IPA		Hebrew Academy				ISO 259		SBL Handbook of Style			
Symbol	IPA		2006		1953		1984	1994	Academic		General Purpose	
Symbol	Tiberian	Modern Hebrew	Name	Translit.	Name	Translit.	Translit.	Translit.	Name	Translit.	Name	Translit.
Consonants
א	[ʔ]	[ʔ], [∅]	alef	' (Note: Functions only as a syllable break in Israeli Hebrew. So, when transcribed, is omitted everywhere except in circumstances where omission would be ambiguous, such as immediately after consonants or between vowels.)	alef	ʼ (Note: Omitted at the beginnings of words.)	ʾ	ʾ	ʾālep̄	ʾ	alef	' or omit
ב	[v]		vet	v	vet	v	b	b	bêt	ḇ	bet	v
בּ	[b]	[b]	bet	b	bet	b	ḃ	ḃ	bêt	b	bet	b
בּ	[bb]	[b]	bet	bb	bet	bb	ḃ	ḃ	bêt	b	bet	b
ג	[ʁ]	[ɡ]	gimel	g	gimel	g	g	g	gîmel	ḡ	gimel	gh
גּ	[g]	[ɡ]	gimel	g	gimel	g	ġ	ġ	gîmel	g	gimel	g
גּ	[gg]	[ɡ]	gimel	gg	gimel	gg	ġ	ġ	gîmel	g	gimel	g
ג׳ (Note: For phonemes in loanwords or their derivations. These are not used in Classical Hebrew, so are omitted from the ISO 259 columns.)		[d͡ʒ]			ǧimel	ǧ	g'	g'				
ד	[ð]	[d]	dalet	d	dalet	d	d	d	dālet	ḏ	dalet	dh
דּ	[d]	[d]	dalet	d	dalet	d	ḋ	d	dālet	d	dalet	d
דּ	[dd]	[d]	dalet	dd	dalet	dd	ḋ	d	dālet	d	dalet	d
ד׳ (Note: Hebrew-letter transliterations of foreign phonemes (used only for the transliterition of proper names or foreign language texts, never in native words or loanwords).)		[ð]			ḏalet	ḏ						
ה	[h]	[h]	he	h	he	h (Note: Omitted at the ends of words.)	h	h	hê	h	he	h
הּ	[hh]	[h]	he	h	he	h	ḣ	ḣ	hê	h	he	h
ו	[v], ([w])	[v], ([w]) (Note: Rarely, loanwords or their derivations contain the phoneme /w/, which standardly is spelled with "ו", indistinguishably from "ו" denoting /v/. Some non-standard distinguishing ways of spelling exist, such as "ו׳" or word-initial "וו" (see orthographic variants of vav), but their usage is not consistent. Therefore, correctly romanizing the "ו" as /w/ cannot rely on orthography but rather on lexical knowledge, e.g. "דַּאַוִין" → "da'awín", "בָּאֲוִיר" → "ba'avír".)	vav	v	waw	w	w	w	wāw	w	vav	v or w
וּ (Note: Shuruk and "ו" with a dagesh look identical ("וּ") and are only distinguishable through the fact that in text with nikud, "ו" with a dagesh will normally be attributed a vocal point in addition, e.g. שׁוּק, ("a market"), trans. "shuk" (the "וּ" denotes a shuruk) as opposed to שִׁוֵּק ("to market"), trans. "shivék" (the "וּ" denotes a vav with dagesh). In the word שִׁוּוּק ("marketing"), trans. "shivúk", the first ("וּ") denotes a vav with dagesh, the second a shuruk, being the vocal point attributed to the first.)	[vv], ([ww])	[v], ([w])	vav	vv	waw	ww	ẇ	w	wāw	w	vav	v or w
ז	[z]	[z]	zayin	z	zayin	z	z	z	zayin	z	zayin	z
זּ	[zz]	[z]	zayin	zz	zayin	zz	ż	z	zayin	z	zayin	z
ז׳		[ʒ]			žayin	ž	z'	z'				
ח	[ħ]	[χ]	ẖet	ẖ	ẖet	ẖ	ḥ	ḥ	ḥêt	ḥ	khet	h or kh
ט	[tˤ]	[t]	tet	t	tet	t	ṭ	ṭ	ṭêt	ṭ	tet	t
טּ	[ttˤ]	[t]	tet	tt	tet	tt	ṭ̇	ṭ	ṭêt	ṭ	tet	t
י (Note: Usually transcribed as i after a vowel and either before a consonant or syllable break or at the end of a word.)	[j]	[j]	yud	y	yud	y	y	y	yôd	y	yod	y
יּ	[jj]	[j]	yud	yy	yud	yy	ẏ	y	yôd	y	yod	y
ך כ	[χ]		khaf	kh	khaf	kh	k	k	kāp	ḵ	kaf	kh
ךּ כּ	[kʰ]	[k]	kaf	k	kaf	k	k̇	k̇	kāp	k	kaf	k
ךּ כּ	[kkʱ]	[k]	kaf	kk	kaf	kk	k̇	k̇	kāp	k	kaf	k
ל	[l]	[l]	lamed	l	lamed	l	l	l	lāmed	l	lamed	l
לּ	[ll]	[l]	lamed	ll	lamed	ll	l̇	l	lāmed	l	lamed	l
ם מ	[m]	[m]	mem	m	mem	m	m	m	mêm	m	mem	m
מּ	[mm]	[m]	mem	mm	mem	mm	ṁ	m	mêm	m	mem	m
ן נ	[n]	[n]	nun	n	nun	n	n	n	nûn	n	nun	n
נּ	[nn]	[n]	nun	nn	nun	nn	ṅ	n	nûn	n	nun	n
ס	[s]	[s]	samekh	s	samekh	s	s	s	sāmek	s	samek	s
סּ	[ss]	[s]	samekh	ss	samekh	ss	ṡ	s	sāmek	s	samek	s
ע	[ʕ]	[ʔ], [∅]	ayin	'	ʻayin	ʻ	ʿ	ʿ	ʿayin	ʿ	ayin	' or omit
ף פ	[f]		fe	f	fe	f	p	p	pê	p̄	pe	f
ףּ פּ (Note: The pe hazak sofit ףּ is found once in the Tanakh (Proverbs 30:6). But ף is never used for /p/ in Modern Hebrew, with פ being used in all positions, including word-finally.)	[pʰ]	[p]	pe	p	pe	p	ṗ	ṗ	pê	p	pe	p
ףּ פּ	[ppʱ]	[p]	pe	pp	pe	pp	ṗ	ṗ	pê	p	pe	p
ץ צ	[sˤ] ~ [zˤ]	[t͡s]	tsadi	ts	ẕadi	ẕ	ṣ	ṣ	ṣādê	ṣ	tsade	ts
צּ	[ssˤ] ~ [zzˤ]	[t͡s]	tsadi	ts	ẕadi	ẕẕ	ṩ	ṣ	ṣādê	ṣ	tsade	ts
ץ׳ צ׳		[t͡ʃ]			čadi	č	ṣ'	ṣ'				
ק	[q̟]	[k]	kuf	k	quf	q	q	q	qôp̄	q	qof	q
קּ	[q̟q̟]	[k]	kuf	kk	quf	qq	q̇	q	qôp̄	q	qof	q
ר	[ʀ̟]	[ʁ]	resh	r	resh	r	r	r	rêš	r	resh	r
רּ	[ʀ̟ʀ̟]	[ʁ]	resh	rr	resh	rr	r	r	rêš	r	resh	r
שׁ	[ʃ]	[ʃ]	shin	sh	shin	sh	š	š	šîn	š	shin	sh
שּׁ	[ʃʃ]	[ʃ]	shin	sh	shin	sh	ṧ	š	šîn	š	shin	sh
שׂ	[s]	[s]	sin	s	sin	s	ś	ś	śîn	ś	sin	s
שּׂ	[ss]	[s]	sin	ss	sin	ss	ṥ	ś	śîn	ś	sin	s
ת	[θ]	[t]	tav	t	taw	t	t	t	tāw	ṯ	tav	th
תּ	[tʰ]	[t]	tav	t	taw	t	ṫ	t	tāw	t	tav	t
תּ	[ttʰ]	[t]	tav	tt	taw	tt	ṫ	t	tāw	t	tav	t
ת׳		[θ]			ṯaw	ṯ						
Forms used only in transliterations of Arabic
ח׳		[χ]										
ט׳		[ðˤ] ~ [zˤ]										
ע׳ ר׳		[ɣ] ~ [ʁ]										
ץ׳ צ׳		[dˤ]										
Vowels
טְ	/∅/		shva naẖ		shewa naẖ		˚	omitted	vocal šĕwăʾ	ĕ		
טְ	/a/ (Note: The vocalic shva was usually realized as /a/ in Tiberian Hebrew, but was also pronounced /ɛ/, /e/, /i/, /ɔ/, /o/, and /u/ according to the vowel's environment in a word.)	[e̞] (Note: Israeli Hebrew typically demotes "shva na" to silent "shva nach" in situations where it can be comfortably omitted in common speech, creating consonant clusters that would otherwise not be permitted in older varieties of Hebrew. In situations where this happens, the "shva" is typically not transliterated at all, or is at most transliterated with an apostrophe (') – see shva.)	shva na	e	shewa naʻ	e	˚	omitted	vocal šĕwăʾ	ĕ		
חֱ	[ɛ]	[e̞]	ẖataf seggol	e	ẖataf seggol	e	ḝ	e	ḥāṭēp sĕgŏl	ĕ		
חֲ	[a]	[ä]	ẖataf pataẖ	a	ẖataf pataẖ	a	ă	a	ḥāṭēp pataḥ	ă	khatef patakh	a
חֳ	[ɔ]	[o̞]	ẖataf kamats	o	ẖataf qamaẕ	o	ŏ	o	ḥāṭēp qāmeṣ	ŏ	khatef qamets	o
טִ	[i]	[i]	ẖirik	i	ẖiriq	i	i	i	short ḥîreq	i	short hireq	i
טִ	[iː]	[i]	ẖirik	i	ẖiriq	i	i	i	long ḥîreq	ī	long hireq	i
טֵ	[eː]	[e̞]	tsere	e	ẕere	e	e	e	ṣērê	ē	tsere	e
טֶ	[ɛ] ~ [ɛː]	[e̞]	seggol	e	seggol	e	ȩ	e	sĕgōl	e	segol	e
טַ	[a] ~ [aː], [ɑ] ~ [ɑː]	[ä]	pataẖ	a	pataẖ	a	a	a	pataḥ	a	patakh	a
טָ	[ɔː]	[ä]	kamats gadol	a	qamaẕ gadol	a	å	a	qāmeṣ	ā	qamets	a
טָ	[ɔ]	[o̞]	kamats katan	o	qamaẕ qatan	o	å	a	qāmeṣ ḥāṭûp	o	qamets khatuf	o
טֹ	[oː]	[o̞]	ẖolam	o	ẖolam	o	o	o	ḥōlem	ō	holem	o
טֻ	[u]	[u]	kubbuts	u	qubbuẕ	u	u	u	short qibbûṣ	u	short qibbuts	u
טֻ	[uː]	[u]	kubbuts	u	qubbuẕ	u	u	u	long qibbûṣ	ū	long qibbuts	u
טוּ	[u] ~ [uː] (Note: The conjunctive vav (וּ) was pronounced /wu/ instead when followed by a shewa.)	[u]	shuruk	u	shuruq	u	ẇ	ẇ	šûreq	û	shureq	u
Other Vowels
וֹ							ŵ	ŵ	full ḥōlem	ô	full holem	o
טִי							iy		ḥîreq yôd	î	hireq yod	i
טָה									final qāmeṣ hê	â	final qamets he	ah
Israeli Diphthongs
טֵי		[e̞j]	tsere	e	ẕere	e	ey		ṣērê yôd	ê	tsere yod	e
טֶי		[e̞j]	seggol	e	seggol	e	ȩy		sĕgōl yôd	ê		
טַי טַיְ		[äj]	pataẖ yud	ay	pataẖ yud	ay			pataḥ yôd	ai		
טָי טָיְ		[äj]	kamats gadol yud	ay	qamaẕ gadol yud	ay			qāmeṣ yôd	āi		
טָי טָיְ		[o̞j]	kamats katan yud	oy	qamaẕ qatan yud	oy			qāmeṣ yôd	āi		
טֹי טֹיְ		[o̞j]	ẖolam yud	oy	ẖolam yud	oy			ḥōlem yôd	ōi		
טֻי טֻיְ		[uj]	kubbuts yud	uy	qubbuẕ yud	uy			qibbûṣ yôd	ui		
טוּי טוּיְ		[uj]	shuruk yud	uy	shuruq yud	uy			šûreq yôd	ûi		

== Transcription vs. transliteration ==
Different purposes call for different choices of romanization. One extreme is to make a phonetic transcription of one person's speech on one occasion.

In Israel, a pronunciation known as General Israeli Hebrew or Standard Hebrew is widely used and documented. For Israeli speech and text where linguistic groups are not at issue, romanization can use a phonetic transcription according to Standard Hebrew pronunciation. However, there are many Israeli groups with differing pronunciations of Hebrew and differing social priorities.

An attempt to devise a more general system of romanization is complicated by the long and varied history of the Hebrew language. Most Hebrew texts can be appropriately pronounced according to several different systems of pronunciation, both traditional and modern. Even today, it is customary to write Hebrew using only consonants and matres lectionis. There was no way to indicate vowels clearly in Hebrew writing until the time of the Second Temple. Since an earlier time, multiple geographically separated communities have used Hebrew as a language of literature rather than conversation.

One system of assigning and indicating pronunciation in Hebrew, the Tiberian vocalization, is broadly authoritative for Hebrew text since the end of the Second Temple period (Sáenz-Badillos, page xi). It is possible to accommodate the pronunciations of different communities by transliterating the Tiberian vocalization without attempting to transcribe a specific phonetic pronunciation.

Notable varieties of Hebrew for which Tiberian vocalization is not suitable are the Hebrew of the Qumran community (as known from the Dead Sea Scrolls) and of the Samaritans. For romanizations of Samaritan pronunciation, it is advisable to take quotations directly from a Samaritan edition of the Hebrew Bible, which has approximately 6,000 textual variations from Jewish editions.

It is appropriate to focus only on the consonantal spelling when discussing unusually structured words from ancient or medieval works.

== Use of Tiberian principles ==
The Tiberian vocalization was devised in order to add indications of pronunciation to the consonantal text of the Hebrew Bible, without changing the consonantal text. It was intended for experts in Biblical Hebrew grammar and morphology.

Transliterations usually avoid the typographically complex marks that are used in Tiberian vocalization. They also attempt to indicate vowels and syllables more explicitly than Tiberian vocalization does. Therefore a technical transliteration requires the use of Tiberian principles, as mentioned below, rather than simply representing the Tiberian symbols. Many transliteration standards require a thorough knowledge of these principles, yet they usually do not provide practical details.

=== Vowels ===
- There are seven basic vowels.
- A vowel may be long, short, or ultrashort.
- The vowel "shva" may be sounded (shva na) or silent (shva nach).
- Consonants that have been used historically to indicate vowels, the "matres lectionis", are no substitute for proper vowel marks.
- The vowel "kamets" may have its usual sound (kamets gadol – long "a") or a different sound (kamets katan – short "o").

=== Consonants ===
- Six consonants (beth, gimel, daleth, kaph, pe, and tav) can be hard or soft. To be specific, they are pronounced either as stops or fricatives ("spirantized"). For example, the letter bet can be pronounced as "b" or "v". Tiberian vocalization marks a hard consonant with a dagesh kal (in the Hebrew term) or lene (Latin). A soft consonant lacks a dagesh kal, and is sometimes explicitly marked using rafe, an overbar. Transliterations sometimes also use an overbar or underbar to mark a soft consonant. (In Modern Sephardic Hebrew, however, only three consonants—bet, kaph, and pe—retain the hard–soft distinction. In the Ashkenazic style of pronunciation, the soft tav is sounded as "s".)
- A letter that looks like shin may be that letter (when marked with a shin dot) or the letter sin (when marked with a sin dot).
- Most consonants can undergo gemination. Tiberian vocalization marks gemination with a dagesh hazak (in the Hebrew term) or forte (Latin), which looks the same as dagesh kal.
- A consonant that is normally silent (most often he) may be sounded if it is a root consonant or possessive ending. Tiberian vocalization marks such a consonant using a mapiq, which looks like a dagesh.
- A silent vav may be used to hold a holem vowel, but sometimes a vav with holem has consonant value.

== Additional transliteration principles ==
A further complication is that the Roman alphabet does not have as many letters for certain sounds found in the Hebrew alphabet, and sometimes no letter at all. Some romanizations resolve this problem using additional non-Tiberian principles:

- The two letters that represent a stop may be written using the forward and backward quote marks, or similar marks.
- Certain consonants are considered "emphatic" (the consonants ט צ ק ח ע), due to being pronounced traditionally toward the back of the mouth. They may be transliterated distinctively by using an underdot.
- The letter "vav" (ו) was once pronounced like English "w", in contrast to its current pronunciation identical to the letter "vet" (the soft letter ב).
- The Karmeli transcription (see link at bottom of page) creates additional letters based on similar Hebrew or Cyrillic letters to represent the sounds that lack Roman letters.

Finally, for ease of reading it is common to apply certain principles foreign to Hebrew:

- Use a hyphen between common prefixes or suffixes and a romanized word.
- Capitalize the first letter of a proper name, but not its prefixes.

== Examples ==
Below is the phrase "שָׁלוֹם עֲלֵיכֶם" (pronounced [ʃaˈloːm ʕaleːˈxem], "Peace be upon you") in various transliteration systems.

System(s)	Transliteration
Artscroll	sholōm alaychem
Artscroll Sephardic	shalom alẹchem
Braille ASCII	%<LOM $3L/#*EM
Brill Simple	shalom ‘ᵃleikhem
Finnish Romanisation	shalom ‘aleicem
German Romanisation	schalom alechem
ISO 259-2	šalŵm ʿaleykem
ISO 259-3	šalom ˁaleikem
Russian Cyrillisation	шало́м алейхэ́м
SBL Academic	šālôm ʿălêk̲em
SBL General	shalom alekhem
Simplified Ashkenazi	sholom aleichem
Simplified Modern Israeli	shalom aleichem
Spanish Romanisation	shalóm aleijém
Latin traditional romanisation	Sāluōm Alēichem

== See also ==
- Anglicisation
- Hebraization of English
- Help:IPA/Hebrew
- Other alphabets in Morse code#Hebrew
- Romanization of Arabic
- Romanization of Yiddish
