= Kubutz and shuruk =

Hebrew niqqud vowel sign

Kubutz and shuruk
וּ ֻ
IPA	u
Transliteration	u
English example	moon
Same appearance as shuruk	Dagesh, Mappiq
Kubutz example
קֻבּוּץ
The word kubutz in Hebrew. The first vowel (under the letter Quf, the three diagonal dots) is the kubutz itself.
Shuruk example
שׁוּרוּק
The word shuruk in Hebrew. Both letters vav with a dot in the middle are examples of shuruk.
Other Niqqud
Shva · Hiriq · Tzere · Segol · Patach · Kamatz · Holam · Dagesh · Mappiq · Shuruk · Kubutz · Rafe · Sin/Shin Dot

Kubutz or qubbutz (modern Hebrew: קֻבּוּץ; IPA: [kuˈbuts], formerly קִבּוּץ, qibbūṣ) and shuruk (Hebrew: שׁוּרוּק, IPA: [ʃuˈʁuk], also known as shuruq) are two Hebrew niqqud vowel signs that represent the sound [u]. In an alternative, Ashkenazi naming, the kubutz (three diagonal dots) is called "shuruk" and shuruk is called "melopum" (מלאפום).

== Appearance ==
The kubutz sign is represented by three diagonal dots "◌ֻ" underneath a letter.

The shuruk is the letter vav with a dot in the middle and to the left of it. The dot is identical to the grammatically different signs dagesh and mappiq, but in a fully vocalized text it is practically impossible to confuse them: shuruk itself is a vowel sign, so if the letter before the vav doesn't have its own vowel sign, then the vav with the dot is a shuruk and otherwise it is a vav with a dagesh or a mappiq. Furthermore, the mappiq only appears at the end of the word and only in the letter he (ה) in modern Hebrew and in the Bible it sometimes appears in aleph (א) and only in some Bible manuscripts it appears in the letter vav, for example in the word גֵּוּ ('torso') [ɡev]. Compare for example vav with dagesh in מְגֻוָּן [məɡuvˈvan] 'varied' (without niqqud: מגוון) as opposed to shuruk in מִגּוּן [miɡˈɡun] 'protection' (without niqqud: מיגון); see also orthographic variants of waw.

== Name ==
In older grammar books the kubbutz is called qibbûṣ pum etc. (קִבּוּץ פּוּם), compression or contraction of the mouth. This was shortened to qibbûṣ (also transliterated as kibbutz etc.) but later all the names of vowel signs were changed to include their own sound in their first syllable. This way kibutz changed to kubutz, and this is the common name today, although the name "kibutz" is still occasionally used, for example by the Academy of the Hebrew Language.

Shuruk was earlier called shureq (שׁוּרֶק), but this name is rarely used today.

== Usage ==
=== Shuruk in modern texts ===
For details on the sounds of Hebrew, see Help:IPA/Hebrew and Hebrew phonology

The shuruk is used to mark [u] at the last syllable of the word and in open syllables in the middle of the word:

- שָׁמְרוּ ('they guarded') [ʃamˈʁu]
- חָתוּל ('cat') [χaˈtul]
- תְּשׁוּבָה ('answer', Tshuva) [tʃuˈva]

Regardless of syllable type, shuruk is always written in foreign words and names if they weren't adapted to Hebrew word structure (mishkal):

- אוּנִיבֶרְסִיטָה ('university') [uniˈveʁ.si.ta]
- הַמְבּוּרְג ('Hamburg') [ˈham.buʁɡ]
- אוּקְרָאִינָה ('Ukraine') [ukˈʁaˈʔina] (closed syllable)

Differently from all other niqqud signs, a shuruk can stand on its own in the beginning of the word and not after a consonant when it is the conjunction ו־ and. Hebrew one-letter words are written together with the next word and their pronunciation may change according to the first letters of that word. The basic vocalization of this conjunction is shva na (וְ־ [və]), but before the labial consonants bet (ב), vav (ו), mem (מ) and pe (פ), and before any letter with shva (except yodh) it becomes a shuruk (וּ־ [u]). This is the consistent vocalization in the Bible and in normative modern Hebrew, but in spoken modern Hebrew it is not consistently productive and the conjunction may simply remain וְ־ in these cases. It is not reflected in writing without niqqud. Examples:

- וּמִכְתָּב ('and a letter') [umiχˈtav]
- וּוֶרֶד ('and a rose') [uˈveʁed]
- וּסְפָרִים ('and books') [usəfaˈʁim]

=== Kubutz in modern texts ===
Kubutz is used only in native Hebrew words and in words with foreign roots that were adapted to Hebrew word structure (mishkal), for example מְפֻרְמָט ('formatted (disk)') [məfuʁˈmat] (without niqqud מפורמט). It is written in closed syllables which do not appear at the end of the word. A closed syllable is one which ends in a consonant with shva nakh (zero vowel) or in a consonant with dagesh khazak (essentially two identical consonants, the first of which has shva nakh).

==== Kubutz in base forms of nouns ====
Common noun patterns in which kubutz appears in the base form are:

- /CuCCaC/ where the middle CC is a double consonant (with Dagesh): סֻלָּם ('scale') [sulˈlam], אֻכָּף ('saddle') [ʔukˈkaf]. Without niqqud: סולם, אוכף.
- /CuCCa/: חֻלְדָּה ('rat') [χulˈda], without niqqud: חולדה. To this pattern belong also the words whose roots' second and third letter are the same and merge into one consonant with dagesh: סֻכָּה ('hut', Sukkah) [sukˈka], root ס־כ־כ, without niqqud: סוכה.
- /CəCuCCa/ where the last CC is a double consonant (with dagesh): נְקֻדָּה ('point') [nəkudˈda]. The dagesh is not realized in modern Hebrew, but if the letter with the dagesh is bet (ב), kaph (כ) or pe (פ), then it is pronounced as a stop consonant: כְּתֻבָּה ('ketubah', 'prenuptial agreement') [kətubˈba], חֲנֻכָּה ('housewarming', Hanukkah) [ħanukˈka]. Without niqqud: נקודה, חנוכה.
- /CuCCan/: שֻׁלְחָן ('desk') [ʃulˈχan], without niqqud: שולחן.
- /CuCCoCet/ with dagesh in the middle letter of the root: כֻּתֹּנֶת ('coat', 'garment') [kutˈtonet]; with a four letter root: גֻּלְגֹּלֶת ('skull') [ɡulˈɡolet]. Without niqqud: כותונת, גולגולת.
- /CuCCeCet/: כֻּסֶּמֶת ('spelt', 'buckwheat') [kusˈsemet], קֻבַּעַת ('goblet') [kubˈbaʕat]. Without niqqud: כוסמת, קובעת.

==== Kubutz in declined forms of nouns ====
Common noun patterns in which kubutz appears in the declined form are:

- Declined forms of words, whose roots' second and third letter are the same, and which have a holam haser in the last syllable of their base form: דֻּבִּים ('bears') [dubˈbim], the plural of דֹּב [dov], root ד־ב־ב; כֻּלָּם ('all of them') [kulˈlam], a declined form of כֹּל [kol], root כ־ל־ל. All these words are written with vav in texts without niqqud: דובים, דוב, כולם, כול.
- Declined forms of words which have the pattern /CaCoC/ in the singular and become /CəCuCCim/ in the plural: צָהֹב ('yellow', [tsaˈhov]), pl. צְהֻבִּים ([tseˈhubˈbim]), עָגֹל ('round', [ʕaˈɡol]), pl. עֲגֻלִּים ([ʕaɡulˈlim]). Without niqqud: צהוב, צהובים, עגול, עגולים. Exception: מָתוֹק ('sweet', [maˈtok]), pl. מְתוּקִים ([məˈtukim]), with holam gadol and shuruk and without dagesh.
- Some words, in the base form of which the penultimate syllable has [o] and is stressed (sometimes called seggolate), may be written with kubutz or with kamatz katan when declined. For example, base form: מַשְׂכֹּרֶת (wage, [masˈkoʁet]); declined: מַשְׂכָּרְתָּהּ [maskoʁˈtah] or מַשְׂכֻּרְתָּהּ [maskuʁˈtah], both being normative spellings and pronunciations of her wage. Without niqqud, in any case: משכורת, משכורתה.

The plural form of words which end in ־וּת was in the past written with a kubutz in texts with niqqud: sg. חָנוּת ('shop'), [ħaˈnut], pl. חֲנֻיּוֹת [ħanujˈjot]. In March 2009 the Academy decided to simplify the niqqud of such words by eliminating the dagesh in the letter yodh and changing the kubutz to shuruk: חֲנוּיוֹת. This doesn't change the pronunciation, since in modern Hebrew the dagesh is not realized anyway. The spelling without niqqud is also unchanged: חנויות.

==== Kubutz in verbs ====
Kubutz is common in verbs in the passive binyanim pual and huf'al and in some conjugated forms of verbs whose roots' second and third letters are the same.

===== Pual =====
Verbs and participles in the passive binyan pual usually have a kubutz in the first letter of the root: כֻּנַּס ('was gathered') [kunˈnas], מקֻבָּל ('acceptable') [məkubˈbal], without niqqud: כונס, מקובל.

If the second letter of the root is one of the guttural consonants aleph (א), he (ה), ayin (ע) and resh (ר) - but not heth (ח) -, the kubutz changes to holam haser in a process called tashlum dagesh (תשלום דגש): יְתֹאַר ('will be described') [yətoˈʔaʁ], מְדֹרָג ('graded') [mədoˈʁaɡ]; without niqqud: יתואר, מדורג.

===== Huf'al =====
Kubutz is used in the prefixes of verbs and participles in the passive binyan Huf'al: הֻרְדַּם ('was put to sleep') [huʁˈdam], מֻסְדָּר ('organized') [musˈdaʁ]. It is also correct to write words in this binyan with kamatz katan in the prefix: הָרְדַּם, מָסְדָּר ([hoʁˈdam], [mosˈdaʁ]). Without niqqud, in any case: הורדם, מוסדר.

The kubutz is used only if the prefix is a closed vowel, which is the majority of cases. With some root patterns, however, it becomes an open vowel, in which case a shuruk is written:

- Roots whose first letter is yodh (י): הוּטַב ('become better') [huˈtav], root י־ט־ב; הוּרַד ('brought down') [huˈrad], root י־ר־ד.
- Roots whose middle letter is waw (ו) or yodh (י): הוּקַם ('erected') [huˈkam], root קום; הוּבַן ('understood') [huˈvan], root בין.
- Roots whose second and third letter are the same: הוּגַן ('protected') [huˈɡan], root גננ.

In many roots whose first letter is nun (נ) and in six roots whose first two letters are yodh (י) and tsade (צ), this letter is assimilated with the second letter of the root, which in turn takes a complementary dagesh. This makes the syllable of the prefix closed, so accordingly the prefix takes kubutz: הֻסַּע ('driven') [husˈsaʕ], root נסע; הֻצַּג ('presented') [hut͡sˈt͡saɡ], root יצג. Without niqqud: הוסע, הוצג.

===== Double roots =====
Kubutz appears in some conjugated forms of verbs with roots whose second and third letter are the same (also called double stems and ע"ע). Most of them are rarely used.

Examples with verb סָבַב ('turn') [saˈvav] in the future tense of binyan qal:

- אֲסֻבֵּךְ [asubˈbeχ] (1 sg. with possessive suffix)
- תְּסֻבֶּינָה [təsubˈbena] (3 pl. f.)

=== In older texts ===
In the Bible shuruk and kubutz are not always used according to the above consistent rules and sometimes quite arbitrarily. For example, in Jeremiah 2:19 appear the words: וּמְשֻׁבוֹתַיִךְ תּוֹכִחֻךְ ('and your backslidings shall reprove you', [uməʃuvoˈtajiχ toχiˈħuχ]). Kubutz is used in both of them, even though in the first word the syllable is not closed and the vav is even a part of this word's root, and in the second word the [u] sound is in the last syllable. Contrariwise, a shuruk is used in closed syllables where a kubutz would be expected, for example in Genesis 2:25 - עֲרוּמִּים ('naked', [ʕarumˈmim], the plural of עָרֹם, [ʕaˈrom]), instead of the more regular עֲרֻמִּים (in modern Hebrew without niqqud: ערומים).

The word נְאֻם (speech, [nəum]) is written with kubutz in the Bible. It was previously frequently used to mark the signature on documents (e.g. נאם יוסף לוי - 'so says Yosef Levi'), but this usage is rare in modern Hebrew, where this word usually means "(a delivered) speech" and is regularly spelled with shuruk - נְאוּם. The name יְהוֹשֻׁעַ ('Joshua', [jəhoˈʃuaʕ]) is spelled with kubutz in the Bible, but usually יְהוֹשׁוּעַ in modern Hebrew.

In the first decades of the revival of the Hebrew language it was common in spelling without niqqud not to write the vav in words which were written with kubutz. For example, in the printed works of Eliezer Ben-Yehuda the word מרבה may mean מְרֻבֶּה ('multiplied', [məʁubˈbe]) and מַרְבֶּה ('multiplying', [maʁˈbe]). This practice disappeared in the middle of twentieth century and now מְרֻבֶּה is written מרובה and מַרְבֶּה is written מרבה.

== Pronunciation ==
In Biblical Hebrew both signs may have indicated the same sound and when the Bible manuscripts were vocalized kubutz was simply used where the letter vav was not written, although other possibilities were proposed by researchers, most commonly that the vowels had different length (quantity), kubutz being shorter, or that the signs indicated different sounds (quality), kubutz being more rounded, although this is a matter of debate. It is also possible that Biblical Hebrew had several varieties of [u] sounds, which were not consistently represented in writing.

Shuruk is usually a reflection of reconstructed Proto-Semitic long /uː/ (ū) sound, although most likely in the Bible kubutz stands for it when the letter vav is not written. Kubutz is one of the reflections of the short Proto-Semitic short /u/ (ŭ) sound. Kamatz katan is a variant of kubutz in the Bible, as they are found in complementary distribution in closely related morphological patterns.

In modern Hebrew, both signs indicate the phoneme /u/, a close back rounded vowel. Its closest equivalent in English is the "oo" sound in tool. It is transliterated as a "u".

In modern Hebrew writing without niqqud the /u/ sound is always written as waw, in which case it is considered a mater lectionis.

The following table contains the pronunciation of the kubutz and shuruk in reconstructed historical forms and dialects using the International Phonetic Alphabet.

Symbol	Name	Pronunciation							
Symbol	Name	Israeli	Ashkenazi		Sephardi	Yemenite	Tiberian	Reconstructed	
Symbol	Name	Israeli	Northern	Southern	Sephardi	Yemenite	Tiberian	Mishnaic	Biblical
ֻ	Kubutz	[u]	[ʊ~uː]	[ɪ~iː]	[u]	?	[u, uː]	?	[ʊ]
וּ	Shuruk	[u]	[ʊ~uː]	[ɪ~iː]	[u]	[əw]	[uː]	?	[uː]

== Vowel length comparison ==
These vowels lengths are not manifested in modern Hebrew. In addition, the short u is usually promoted to a long u in Israeli writing for the sake of disambiguation.

Vowel Length			IPA	Transliteration	English example
Long	Short	Very Short	IPA	Transliteration	English example
וּ	ֻ	n/a	[u]	u	tube

== Unicode encoding ==
Glyph	Unicode	Name
ֻ	U+05BB	QUBUTS
ּ	U+05BC	DAGESH, MAPIQ, OR SHURUQ

== See also ==
- Niqqud
