= Patach =

Hebrew niqqud vowel sign

Patach
ַ
IPA	[a] or [ä]
Transliteration	a
English approximation	far
Same sound	kamatz
Example
גַּם
The word for also in Hebrew, gam. The first and only vowel (under Gimel, the horizontal line) is a patach.
Other Niqqud
Shwa · Hiriq · Tzere · Segol · Patach · Kamatz · Holam · Dagesh · Mappiq · Shuruk · Kubutz · Rafe · Sin/Shin Dot

Patach or pataḥ (Hebrew: פַּתָּח patákh, IPA: [paˈtaħ], Biblical Hebrew: pattā́ḥ) is a Hebrew niqqud vowel sign represented by a horizontal line ⟨ אַ ⟩ underneath a letter. In modern Hebrew, it indicates the phoneme /a/ which is close to the [a] sound in the English word far and is transliterated as an a.

In Modern Hebrew, a patach makes the same sound as a kamatz, as does the hataf patach (Hebrew: חֲטַף פַּתַח IPA: [ħaˈtˤaf paˈtaħ], "reduced patach"). The reduced (or hataf) niqqud exist for patach, kamatz, and segol which contain a shva next to it.

In Yiddish orthography, a patach (called pasekh in Yiddish) has two uses. The combination of pasekh with the letter aleph, אַ, is used to represent the vowel [a]; the combination of pasekh with a digraph consisting of two yods, ײַ, is used to represent the diphthong [aj].

== Etymology ==
The patach name comes from the verb פָּתַח (patákh) 'to open', because the vowel's pronunciation, the [a] sound, requires the mouth to be opened wide.

== Pronunciation ==
The following table contains the pronunciation and transliteration of the different forms of patach in reconstructed historical forms and dialects using the International Phonetic Alphabet.

The letters Bet ⟨ב⟩ and Het ⟨ח⟩ used in this table are only for demonstration, any letter can be used.

Symbol		Name	Pronunciation						
Symbol		Name	Israeli	Ashkenazi	Sephardi	Yemenite	Tiberian	Reconstructed	
Symbol		Name	Israeli	Ashkenazi	Sephardi	Yemenite	Tiberian	Mishnaic	Biblical
בַ		patach	[a]	[ä]	[ä]	[a]	[a(ː)]	[a]	[a]
בַא	בַה	patach malei	[a]	[ä]	[ä]	[a]	[aː]	[a]	[a]
חֲ		hataf patach	[a]	[ä]	[ä]	[a]	[ă]	[a]	[a]

A patach on a letter ח, ע, or הּ (that is, ה with a mappiq in it) at the end of a word is sounded before the letter, and not after. Thus, נֹחַ (Noah; properly transliterated as Noaḥ) is pronounced /no.aχ/ in Modern Hebrew and /no.aħ/ or /no.ʔaħ/ in Biblical Hebrew. This only occurs at the ends of words, only with patach and only with these three letters. It is sometimes called a patach gnuva (literally, 'stolen patach', but usually translated as 'furtive patach'), evoking the idea of these letters stealing the patach from its usual position.

== Vowel length comparison ==
By adding two vertical dots (shva) the vowel is made very short. However, these vowels lengths are not manifested in Modern Hebrew.

Vowel comparison table
Vowel Length			IPA	Transliteration	English approximation
Long	Short	Very short	IPA	Transliteration	English approximation
ָ	ַ	ֲ	[a]	a	spa
Kamatz	Patach	Reduced patach	[a]	a	spa

== Unicode encoding ==
Glyph	Unicode	Name
ַ	U+05B7	PATAH
ֲ	U+05B2	HATAF PATAH

== See also ==
- Niqqud
- Kamatz
- Fathah, the related diacritic in Arabic
