= Segol =

Hebrew niqqud vowel sign

Segol
ֶ
IPA	ɛ
Transliteration	e
English example	bed
Same sound	tzere
Example
שֶׁל
The word for of in Hebrew, shel. The triangular array of three dots under the letter Shin form the segol.
Other Niqqud
Shva · Hiriq · Tzere · Segol · Patach · Kamatz · Holam · Dagesh · Mappiq · Kubutz and Shuruk · Rafe · Sin/Shin Dot

Segol (modern Hebrew: סֶגּוֹל, IPA: [seˈɡol]; formerly סְגוֹל, səḡôl) is a Hebrew niqqud vowel sign that is represented by three dots forming an upside down equilateral triangle "ֶ ". As such, it resembles an upside down therefore sign (a because sign) underneath a letter. In modern Hebrew, it indicates the phoneme /e/ which is similar to "e" in the English word sound in sell and is transliterated as an e.

In Modern Hebrew segol makes the same sound as tzere, as does the Hataf Segol (Hebrew: חֲטַף סֶגּוֹל IPA: [ħaˈtaf seˈɡol], "Reduced Segol"). The reduced (or ħataf) niqqud exist for segol, patah, and kamatz which contain a shva next to it.

== Etymology ==
The segol name comes from the Aramaic word סְגוֹל (segol) meaning 'cluster of grapes', because the vowel's sign, three dots forming an upside down triangle " ֶ ", resembles a cluster of grapes.

== Pronunciation ==
The following table contains the pronunciation and transliteration of the different segols in reconstructed historical forms and dialects using the International Phonetic Alphabet.

The letters Bet ⟨ב⟩ and Het ⟨ח⟩ used in this table are only for demonstration; any letter can be used.

Symbol	Name	Pronunciation						
Symbol	Name	Modern	Ashkenazi	Sephardi	Yemenite	Tiberian	Reconstructed	
Symbol	Name	Modern	Ashkenazi	Sephardi	Yemenite	Tiberian	Mishnaic	Biblical
בֶ	Segol	[e̞]	[e̞]	[e̞]	[a]	[ɛ, ɛː]	?	[ɛ]
בֶי בֶה בֶא	Segol Male	[e̞]	[e̞]	[e̞]	[a]	[ɛː]	?	[ɛː, ɛj]
חֱ	Hataf Segol	[e̞]	[e̞]	[e̞]	[a]	[ɛ̆]	?	[ɛ]

In addition, a letter with a segol or tzere with a succeeding yod often makes the "ei" (also spelled "ey") sound such as in they or tape.

== Vowel length comparison ==
By adding two vertical dots (shva), the vowel can be made very short. However, the vowels lengths are not manifested in Modern Hebrew.

Vowel comparison table
Vowel length			IPA	Transliteration	English example
Long	Short	Very Short	IPA	Transliteration	English example
ֵ	ֶ	ֱ	[e̞]	e	temp
Tzere	Segol	Reduced Segol	[e̞]	e	temp

== Unicode encoding ==
Glyph	Unicode	Name
ֶ	U+05B6	SEGOL
ֱ	U+05B1	HATAF SEGOL
