= Hebrew phonology =

Hebrew phonology may refer to:

- Biblical Hebrew phonology
- Modern Hebrew phonology
- Tiberian Hebrew
