= Mappiq =

Diacritic used in the Hebrew alphabet

Mappiq
ּ
IPA	h
Transliteration	h
Same appearance	dagesh, shuruk
Example
גֹּבַהּ
The word for height in Hebrew, govah. The centre dot in the leftmost letter (which is the letter He) is a mappiq.
Other Niqqud
Shva · Hiriq · Tzere · Segol · Patach · Kamatz · Holam · Dagesh · Mappiq · Shuruk · Kubutz · Rafe · Sin/Shin Dot

The mappiq (מַפִּיק mapík; also mapiq, mapik, mappik, lit. "causing to go out") is a diacritic used in the Hebrew alphabet. It is part of the Masoretes' system of niqqud (vowel points), and was added to Hebrew orthography at the same time. It takes the form of a dot in the middle of a letter (usually ה, he). An identical point with a different phonetic function (marking different consonants) is called a dagesh.

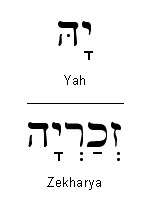

The mappiq is used to indicate that the corresponding letter is to be pronounced as a consonant, although in a position where the letter usually indicates a vowel. Typically, the mappiq is used in the middle of הּ (he), though it historically and biblically has been used with יּ (yodh), וּ (vav).

Before the vowel points were invented, some consonants were used to indicate vowel sounds. These consonants are called matres lectionis (New Latin: sg. māter lēctiōnis "mother of reading", pl. mātrēs lēctiōnis "mothers of reading", calques of Hebrew: אֵם קְרִיאָה em kriá and אִמּוֹת קְרִיאָה imót kriá - with the same meaning). The letter he (transliterated H) at the end of a word (Hebrew is written from right to left) can indicate the vowel sound a or e. When it does, it is not acting as a consonant, and therefore in pure phonetic logic the Biblical name Zechariah (among others) should be spelled "Zekharya" without the final "h". However, silent final h being also a feature of English, it is usually retained in Hebrew transliterations to distinguish final he from final aleph.

The divine name Yah has a mappiq (a dot inside the last letter), so the last letter shall not be read as a vowel a, but as the consonant H - and therefore Yah (and not Ya).

The most common occurrence of mappiq is in the suffix "-ah", meaning "her".

A he with mappiq is meant to be pronounced as a full consonant "h". In modern Hebrew, however, it is normally silent, although it is still pronounced in religious contexts by careful readers of the prayers and scriptures.

== Rafe ==
In Masoretic manuscripts the opposite of a mappiq would be indicated by a rafe, a small line on top of the letter. This is no longer found in Hebrew.

== See also ==
- Hebrew alphabet
- Hebrew phonology
- Mater lectionis
- Rafe
