= Aleph =

First letter of many Semitic abjads

Aleph Bet →
- Phoenician: 𐤀
- Hebrew: א
- Samaritan: ࠀ
- Aramaic: 𐡀
- Syriac: ܐ
- Nabataean: 𐢁𐢀
- Arabic: ا
- South Arabian: 𐩱
- Geʽez: አ
- North Arabian: 𐪑
- Ugaritic: 𐎀
- Phonemic representation: ʔ, a
- Position in alphabet: 1
- Numerical value: 1

Alphabetic derivatives of the Phoenician
- Greek: Α
- Latin: A, Ɑ
- Cyrillic: А, Ӏ

Aleph (also spelled alef or alif, transliterated ʾ) is the first letter of the Semitic abjads, including Phoenician ʾālep 𐤀, Hebrew ʾālef א, Aramaic ʾālap 𐡀, Syriac ʾālap̄ ܐ, Arabic ʾalif ا, and North Arabian 𐪑. It also appears as South Arabian 𐩱 and Ge'ez ʾälef አ.

These letters are believed to have derived from an Egyptian hieroglyph depicting the head of an ox to describe the initial sound of *ʾalp, the West Semitic word for "ox" (compare Biblical Hebrew אֶלֶף ʾelef, 'ox'). The Phoenician variant gave rise to the Greek alpha (Α), being reinterpreted to express not the glottal consonant but the accompanying vowel, and hence the Latin A and Cyrillic А and possibly the Armenian letter Ա.

Phonetically, aleph originally represented the onset of a vowel at the glottis. In Semitic languages, this functions as a prosthetic weak consonant, allowing roots with only two true consonants to be conjugated in the manner of a standard three consonant Semitic root. In most Hebrew dialects as well as Syriac, the aleph is an absence of a true consonant, a glottal stop ([ʔ]), the sound found in the catch in uh-oh. In Arabic, the alif represents the glottal stop pronunciation when it is the initial letter of a word. In texts with diacritical marks, the pronunciation of an aleph as a consonant is rarely indicated by a special marking, hamza in Arabic and mappiq in Tiberian Hebrew. In later Semitic languages, aleph could sometimes function as a mater lectionis indicating the presence of a vowel elsewhere (usually long). When this practice began is the subject of some controversy, though it had become well established by the late stage of Old Aramaic (ca. 200 BCE). Aleph is often transliterated as U+02BE ʾ MODIFIER LETTER RIGHT HALF RING, based on the Greek spiritus lenis ʼ; for example, in the transliteration of the letter name itself, ʾāleph.

== Origin ==
The name aleph is derived from the West Semitic word for 'ox', as in the Biblical Hebrew word eleph (אֶלֶף) 'ox', and the shape of the letter derives from a Proto-Sinaitic glyph that may have been based on an Egyptian hieroglyph, which depicts an ox's head.

Hieroglyph	Proto-Sinaitic	Phoenician	Paleo-Hebrew
𓃾	Aleph	Aleph	Aleph

In Modern Standard Arabic, the word أليف /ʔaliːf/ literally means 'tamed' or 'familiar', derived from the root ʔ-L-F, from which the verb ألِف /ʔalifa/ means 'to be acquainted with; to be on intimate terms with'. In modern Hebrew, the same root ʔ-L-P (alef-lamed-peh) gives me'ulaf, the passive participle of the verb le'alef, meaning 'trained' (when referring to pets) or 'tamed' (when referring to wild animals).

== Ancient Egyptian ==
A
"Aleph"
in hieroglyphs

The Egyptian "vulture" hieroglyph (Gardiner G1), by convention pronounced [a]) is also referred to as aleph, on grounds that it has traditionally been taken to represent a glottal stop ([ʔ]), although some recent suggestions tend towards an alveolar approximant ([ɹ]) sound instead. Despite the name it does not correspond to an aleph in cognate Semitic words, where the single "reed" hieroglyph is found instead.

The phoneme is commonly transliterated by a symbol composed of two half-rings, in Unicode (as of version 5.1, in the Latin Extended-D range) encoded at U+A722 Ꜣ LATIN CAPITAL LETTER EGYPTOLOGICAL ALEF and U+A723 ꜣ LATIN SMALL LETTER EGYPTOLOGICAL ALEF. A fallback representation is the numeral 3, or the Middle English character ȝ Yogh; neither are to be preferred to the genuine Egyptological characters.

== Arabic ʾalif ==
ʾalif ألف
- ا

Usage
- Writing system: Arabic script
- Type: Abjad
- Language of origin: Arabic language
- Sound values: ʔ, aː
- Alphabetical position: 1

History
- Development: 𐤀: 𐡀; 𐢀 ,𐢁; ا

Other
- Writing direction: Right-to-left

Written as ا or 𐪑, spelled as ألف or 𐪑𐪁𐪐 and transliterated as alif, it is the first letter in Arabic and North Arabian. Together with Hebrew aleph, Greek alpha and Latin A, it is descended from Phoenician ʾāleph, from a reconstructed Proto-Canaanite ʾalp "ox".

In classical Arabic calligraphy, alif is also used as the main reference for the proportions of the other letters. Its height is traditionally measured in nuqṭah (نقطة "dots"), which represent the width of the pen nib. Different calligraphy manuals give different values for the height of alif, usually between five and ten dots, depending on the script. A 2020 study by Yaghan analyzed these traditional rules using geometric methods and showed that the different historical measurements can be explained by changes in pen angle and how the dots are arranged, while still keeping simple whole-number height-to-width ratios. The study also discusses how other letters were historically derived from alif and from a circle based on its height.

Alif has the highest frequency out of all 28 letters in the Arabic abjad.

Alif is written in one of the following ways depending on its position in the word:

Position in word:	Isolated	Final	Medial	Initial
Glyph form: (Help)	ا	ـا	ـا	ا

North Arabian
𐪑

=== Arabic variants ===
==== Alif mahmūza: أ and إ ====
The Arabic letter alif was originally used to render either a long /aː/ or a glottal stop /ʔ/. That led to orthographical confusion and to the introduction of the additional marking hamzat qaṭ' ﺀ to fix the problem. Hamza is not considered a full letter in Arabic orthography: in most cases, it appears on a carrier, either a wāw (ؤ), a dotless yā' (ئ), or an alif.

Position in word:	Isolated	Final	Medial	Initial
Glyph form: (Help)	أ	ـأ	ـأ	أ

The choice of carrier depends on complicated orthographic rules. Alif إ أ is generally the carrier if the only adjacent vowel is fatḥah. It is the only possible carrier if hamza is the first phoneme of a word. Where alif acts as a carrier for hamza, hamza is added above the alif, or, for initial alif-kasrah, below it and indicates that the letter so modified is indeed a glottal stop, not a long vowel.

A second type of hamza, hamzat waṣl (همزة وصل), whose diacritic is normally omitted outside of sacred texts, occurs only as the initial letter of the definite article and in some related cases. It differs from hamzat qaṭ' in that it is elided after a preceding vowel. Alif is always the carrier.

Position in word:	Isolated	Final	Medial	Initial
Glyph form: (Help)	ٱ	ـٱ	ـٱ	ٱ

==== Alif mamdūda: آ ====
The alif mamdūda is a double alif, expressing a glottal stop /ʔ/ followed by a long /aː/. Essentially, it is the same as a أا sequence, but is represented by placing a maddah over a regular alif: آ (final ـآ) 'ā /ʔaː/, for example in آخر ākhir /ʔaːxir/ 'last'.

Position in word:	Isolated	Final	Medial	Initial
Glyph form: (Help)	آ	ـآ	ـآ	آ

"It has become standard for a hamza followed by a long ā to be written as two alifs, one vertical and one horizontal", the "horizontal" alif being the maddah sign.

==== Alif maqṣūrah: ى ====
The ى ('limited/restricted alif', alif maqṣūrah), commonly known in Egypt as alif layyinah (ألف لينة, 'flexible alif'), may appear only at the end of a word. Although it looks different from a regular alif, it represents the same sound /aː/, often realized as a short vowel. When it is written, alif maqṣūrah is indistinguishable from final Persian ye or Arabic yā' as it is written in the Nile valley, sometimes elsewhere, and in the Quran.

The letter is transliterated as y in Kazakh, representing the vowel /ə/. In Jawi it is known as ye and represents a schwa /ə/.

Alif maqsurah is transliterated as á in ALA-LC, ā in DIN 31635, à in ISO 233-2, and ỳ in ISO 233.

In Arabic, alif maqsurah ى is not used initially or medially, and it is not joinable initially or medially in any font. However, the letter is used initially and medially in the Uyghur Arabic alphabet and the Arabic-based Kyrgyz alphabet, representing the vowel /ɯ/: (ىـ ـىـ).

Position in word:	Isolated	Final	Medial	Initial
Glyph form: (Help)	ى	ـى	ـىـ	ىـ

As a vowel, the letter alif maqsurah can be a carrier with a hamza. The alif maqṣūrah with hamza is thus written as:

Position in word:	Isolated	Final	Medial	Initial
Glyph form: (Help)	ئ	ـئ	ـئـ	ئـ

=== Numeral ===
As a numeral, alif stands for the number one. It may be modified as follows to represent other numbers.

Modification to alif	Number represented
One dot below	1,000
One line below	10,000
One line above	1,000,000
Two dots below	10,000,000

== Aramaic ==
The Aramaic reflex of the letter is conventionally represented with the Hebrew א in typography for convenience, but the actual graphic form varied significantly over the long history and wide geographic extent of the language. Maraqten identifies three different aleph traditions in East Arabian coins: a lapidary Aramaic form that realizes it as a combination of a V-shape and a straight stroke attached to the apex, much like a Latin K; a cursive Aramaic form he calls the "elaborated X-form", essentially the same tradition as the Hebrew reflex; and an extremely cursive form of two crossed oblique lines, much like a simple Latin X.

Cursive Aramaic	Lapidary Aramaic
	Lapidary aleph

== Hebrew alef ==
Hebrew spelling: אָלֶף

In Modern Israeli Hebrew, the letter either represents a glottal stop ([ʔ]) or indicates a hiatus (the separation of two adjacent vowels into distinct syllables, with no intervening consonant). It is sometimes silent (word-finally always, word-medially sometimes: הוּא [hu] "he", רָאשִׁי [ʁaˈʃi] "main", רֹאשׁ [ʁoʃ] "head", רִאשׁוֹן [ʁiˈʃon] "first"). The pronunciation varies in different Jewish ethnic divisions.

In gematria, aleph represents the number 1, and when used at the beginning of Hebrew years, it means 1000 (e.g. א׳תשנ״ד in numbers would be the Hebrew date 1754, not to be confused with 1754 CE).

Aleph, along with ayin, resh, he and heth, cannot receive a dagesh. (However, there are few very rare examples of the Masoretes adding a dagesh or mappiq to an aleph or resh. The verses of the Hebrew Bible for which an aleph with a mappiq or dagesh appears are Genesis 43:26, Leviticus 23:17, Job 33:21 and Ezra 8:18.)

In Modern Hebrew, the frequency of the usage of alef, out of all the letters, is 4.94%.

Aleph is sometimes used as a mater lectionis to denote a vowel, usually /a/. That use is more common in words of Aramaic and Arabic origin, in foreign names, and some other borrowed words.

Orthographic variants
Various print fonts			Cursive Hebrew	Solitreo	Rashi script
Serif	Sans-serif	Monospaced	Cursive Hebrew	Solitreo	Rashi script
א	א	א			

=== Rabbinic Judaism ===
Aleph is the subject of a midrash that praises its humility in not demanding to start the Bible. (In Hebrew, the Bible begins with the second letter of the alphabet, bet.) In the story, aleph is rewarded by being allowed to start the Ten Commandments. (In Hebrew, the first word is anoki (אָנֹכִי), which starts with an aleph.)

In the Sefer Yetzirah, the letter aleph is king over breath, formed air in the universe, temperate in the year, and the chest in the soul.

Aleph is also the first letter of the Hebrew word emet (אֱמֶת), which means truth. In Judaism, it was the letter aleph that was carved into the head of the golem that ultimately gave it life.

Aleph also begins the three words that make up God's name in Exodus, I Am who I Am (in Hebrew, Ehyeh Asher Ehyeh אהיה אשר אהיה), and aleph is an important part of mystical amulets and formulas.

Aleph represents the oneness of God. The letter can be seen as being composed of an upper yud, a lower yud, and a vav leaning on a diagonal. The upper yud represents the hidden and ineffable aspects of God while the lower yud represents God's revelation and presence in the world. The vav ("hook") connects the two realms.

=== Yiddish ===
In Yiddish, aleph is used for several orthographic purposes in native words, usually with different diacritical marks borrowed from Hebrew niqqud:

- With no diacritics, aleph is silent; it is written at the beginning of words before vowels spelled with the letter vov or yud. For instance, oykh 'also' is spelled אויך. The digraph וי represents the initial diphthong [oj], but that digraph is not permitted at the beginning of a word in Yiddish orthography, so it is preceded by a silent aleph. Some publications use a silent aleph adjacent to such vowels in the middle of a word as well when necessary to avoid ambiguity.
- An aleph with the diacritic pasekh, אַ, represents the vowel [a] in standard Yiddish.
- An aleph with the diacritic komets, אָ, represents the vowel [ɔ] in standard Yiddish.

Loanwords from Hebrew or Aramaic in Yiddish are spelled as they are in their language of origin.

== Syriac ʾalaph/olaf ==
Alaph
Madnḫaya alap
Serṭo olaph
Esṭrangela alap

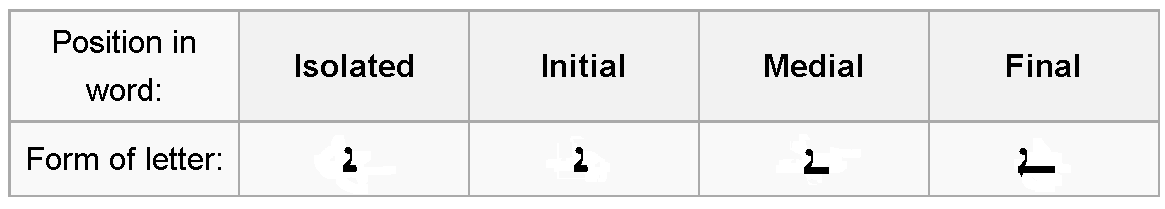

In the Syriac alphabet, the first letter is ܐ, Classical Syriac: ܐܵܠܲܦ, alap (in eastern dialects) or olaph (in western dialects). It is used in word-initial position to mark a word beginning with a vowel, but some words beginning with i or u do not need its help, and sometimes, an initial alap/olaph is elided. For example, when the Syriac first-person singular pronoun ܐܸܢܵܐ is in enclitic positions, it is pronounced no/na (again west/east), rather than the full form eno/ana. The letter occurs very regularly at the end of words, where it represents the long final vowels o/a or e. In the middle of the word, the letter represents either a glottal stop between vowels (but West Syriac pronunciation often makes it a palatal approximant), a long i/e (less commonly o/a) or is silent.

== South Arabian/Ge'ez ==
In the Ancient South Arabian alphabet, 𐩱 appears as the seventeenth letter of the South Arabian abjad. The letter is used to render a glottal stop /ʔ/.

In the Ge'ez alphabet, ʾälef አ appears as the thirteenth letter of its abjad. This letter is also used to render a glottal stop /ʔ/.

South Arabian	Ge'ez
𐩱	አ

== Other uses ==
=== Mathematics ===
In set theory, the Hebrew aleph glyph is used as the symbol to denote the aleph numbers, which represent the cardinality of infinite sets. This notation was introduced by mathematician Georg Cantor. In older mathematics books, the letter aleph is often printed upside down by accident, partly because a Monotype matrix for aleph was mistakenly constructed the wrong way up.

=== Politics ===
The Mapai political party in Israel used an aleph as its election symbol, and featured it prominently in its campaign posters.

=== Religion ===
Guru Nanak, regarded as the founder of Sikhism, used the aleph to represent the oneness of God. Aleph is also the current name of a religious cult in Japan.

=== Phonetics ===
In IPA the aleph glotal plosive is depicted by Ɂ (unicode point LATIN CAPITAL LETTER GLOTAL STOP, U+0241) In earlier days of phonology a small arch based on Greek Smooth breathing or a doubled one (now depicted by Ꜣ, unicode point LATIN CAPITAL LETTER EGYPTOLOGICAL ALEF) was used for this purpose.

== Character encodings ==
Character information
Preview	א		ا		ܐ		ࠀ		𐎀		𐤀		𐡀		𐫀		ℵ		ﬡ	
Unicode name	HEBREW LETTER ALEF		ARABIC LETTER ALEF		SYRIAC LETTER ALAPH		SAMARITAN LETTER ALAF		UGARITIC LETTER ALPA		PHOENICIAN LETTER ALF		IMPERIAL ARAMAIC LETTER ALEPH		MANICHAEAN LETTER ALEPH		ALEF SYMBOL		HEBREW LETTER WIDE ALEF	
Encodings	decimal	hex	dec	hex	dec	hex	dec	hex	dec	hex	dec	hex	dec	hex	dec	hex	dec	hex	dec	hex
Unicode	1488	U+05D0	1575	U+0627	1808	U+0710	2048	U+0800	66432	U+10380	67840	U+10900	67648	U+10840	68288	U+10AC0	8501	U+2135	64289	U+0FB21
UTF-8	215 144	D7 90	216 167	D8 A7	220 144	DC 90	224 160 128	E0 A0 80	240 144 142 128	F0 90 8E 80	240 144 164 128	F0 90 A4 80	240 144 161 128	F0 90 A1 80	240 144 171 128	F0 90 AB 80	226 132 181	E2 84 B5	239 172 161	EF AC A1
UTF-16	1488	05D0	1575	0627	1808	0710	2048	0800	55296 57216	D800 DF80	55298 56576	D802 DD00	55298 56384	D802 DC40	55298 57024	D802 DEC0	8501	2135	64289	FB21
Numeric character reference	&#1488;	&#x5D0;	&#1575;	&#x627;	&#1808;	&#x710;	&#2048;	&#x800;	&#66432;	&#x10380;	&#67840;	&#x10900;	&#67648;	&#x10840;	&#68288;	&#x10AC0;	&#8501;	&#x2135;	&#64289;	&#xFB21;
Named character reference																	&alefsym;, &aleph;			

Character information
Preview	ى	
Unicode name	ARABIC LETTER ALEF MAKSURA	
Encodings	decimal	hex
Unicode	1609	U+0649
UTF-8	217 137	D9 89
Numeric character reference	&#1609;	&#x649;

== See also ==
- Modifier letter right half ring ʾ
- Al-
- Aleph number
- Arabic yāʼ
- Hamzah
