= Dagesh =

Diacritic used in the Hebrew alphabet

- ּ

Usage
- Writing system: Hebrew alphabet
- Type: Abjad
- Language of origin: Hebrew
- Sound values: Biblical; ḥazaq: [ː] (gemination), qal: [β]→[b], [ɣ]→[ɡ], [ð]→[d], [x]→[k], [ɸ]→[p], [θ]→[t]; Modern; [v]→[b], [x]~[χ]→[k], [f]→[p]
- In Unicode: U+05BC

History
- Sisters: Mappiq, shuruq dot
- Transliterations: Biblical; ḥazaq: doubled consonant, qal: none (Note: SBL transliteration system); Modern; v→b, kh→k, f→p

Other
- Associated graphs: ב bet, ג gimel, ד dalet, כ kaf, פ pe, ת tav

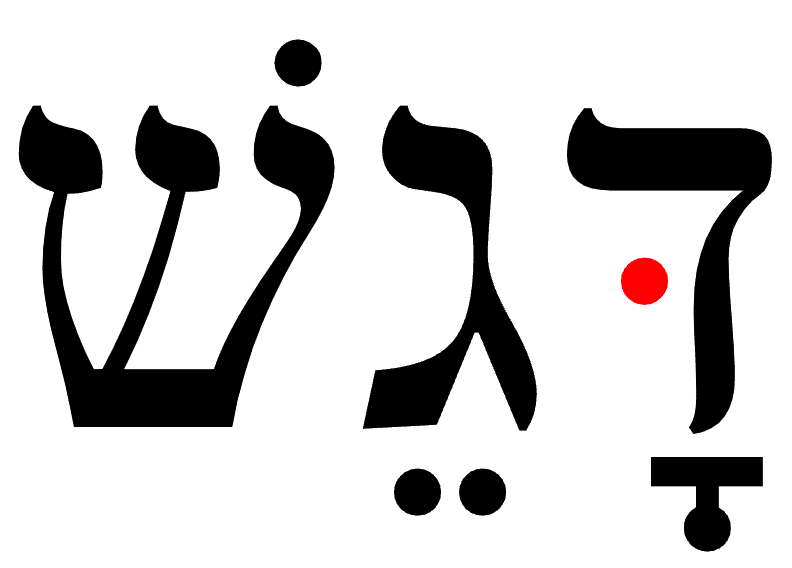
The word dagesh in Hebrew. The red dot on the rightmost character (the letter dalet) is a dagesh.

The dagesh (Hebrew: דָּגֵשׁ, romanized: dagésh) is a diacritic that is used in the Hebrew alphabet. It takes the form of a dot placed inside a consonant.

A dagesh can either indicate a "hard" plosive version of the consonant (known as dagesh qal, literally 'light dot') or that the consonant is geminated (known as dagesh ḥazaq, literally 'hard dot').

In Modern Hebrew, the dagesh only changes the pronunciation of ב bet, כ kaf, and פ pe: in those letters, it turns a fricative sound (vet, khaf, and fe) into a plosive sound (bet, kaf, and pe), regardless of the dagesh's grammatical/orthographic origin, kal or ḥazaq; gemination itself (lengthening of the consonant) is generally not pronounced in any consonant.

The dagesh was added to Hebrew orthography at the same time as the Masoretic system of niqqud (vowel points).

Two other diacritics with different functions, the mappiq and the shuruq dot, are visually identical to the dagesh but are only used with vowel letters.

The dagesh and mappiq symbols are usually omitted when writing without niqqud (e.g. בּ is written as ב), however, dagesh may be added to words that would be ambiguous without niqqud. The use or omission of such marks is usually consistent throughout any given context.

== Dagesh qal ==
A dagesh kal or dagesh qal (דגש קל, or דגש קשיין, also dagesh lene, weak/light dagesh) may be placed inside the consonants ב bet, ג gimel, ד dalet, כ kaf, פ pe and ת tav. They each have two sounds, the original hard plosive sound (which originally contained no dagesh as it was the only pronunciation), and a soft fricative version produced as such for speech efficiency because of the position in which the mouth is left immediately after a vowel has been produced.

Although there is debate, some scholars suggest that prior to the Babylonian captivity, the soft sounds of these letters did not exist in Hebrew, but they were later differentiated in Hebrew writing as a result of the Aramaic-influenced pronunciation of Hebrew. The Aramaic languages, including Jewish versions of Aramaic, have these same allophonic pronunciations of the letters.

The letters take on their hard sounds when they have no vowel sound before them, and take their soft sounds when a vowel immediately precedes them. In Biblical Hebrew this was the case within a word and also across word boundaries, though in Modern Hebrew there are no longer across word boundaries, since the soft and hard sounds are no longer allophones of each other, but regarded as distinct phonemes.

When vowel diacritics are used, the hard sounds are indicated by a central dot called dagesh, while the soft sounds lack the mark. In Modern Hebrew, however, the dagesh only changes the pronunciation of ב bet, כ kaf, and פ pe. Traditional Ashkenazic pronunciation also varies the pronunciation of ת tav, as does Yemenite pronunciation. Some traditional Middle Eastern pronunciations, like the Yemenite and Iraqi traditions, carry alternate forms for ד dalet.

| With dagesh | | | | | Without dagesh | | | | |
| Symbol | Name | Transliteration | IPA | Example in English | Symbol | Name | Transliteration | IPA | Example in English |
|---|---|---|---|---|---|---|---|---|---|
| בּ | bet | b | /b/ | bun | ב | vet | v | /v/ | van |
| כּ ךּ (Note: "ךּ" is rare but exists, e.g. the last word in Deuteronomy 7:1 (דברים פרק ז׳ פסוק א׳) in the word "מִמֶּךָּ" (see here), or the word אַרְאֶךָּ "I will show you" in the Lech-Lecha of Genesis 12:1 (see here).) | kaph | k | /k/ | kangaroo | כ ך | khaph | kh/ch/ḵ | /χ/ | loch |
| פּ ףּ (Note: "ףּ" is rare but exists, e.g. the second word in Proverbs 30:6 (משלי פרק ל׳ פסוק ו׳) in the word "תּוֹסְףְּ" – see here.) | pe | p | /p/ | pass | פ ף | phe | f/ph | /f/ | find |

In Ashkenazi pronunciation, tav without a dagesh is pronounced [s], while in other traditions, like the Yemenite and Iraqi traditions, it is assumed to have been pronounced [θ] at the time niqqud was introduced. In Modern Hebrew, it is always pronounced [t].

The letters gimel (ג) and dalet (ד) may also contain a dagesh kal. This indicates an allophonic variation of the phonemes /ɡ/ and /d/, a variation which no longer exists in modern Hebrew pronunciation. The variations are believed to have been: גּ pronounced as [ɡ], ג as [ɣ], דּ as [d], and ד as [ð]. The Hebrew spoken by the Jews of Yemen (Yemenite Hebrew) still preserves unique phonemes for these letters with and without a dagesh.

=== Pronunciation ===
Among Modern Hebrew speakers, the pronunciation of some of the above letters has become the same as others:

| Letter | Pronounced like | Letter |
|---|---|---|
| ב vet | (without dagesh) like | ו vav |
| כ khaf | (without dagesh) like | ח chet |
| כּ kaf | (with dagesh) like | ק qof |
| תּ, ת tav | (with and without dagesh) like | ט tet |

== Dagesh hazaq ==
Dagesh ḥazak or dagesh ḥazaq (דגש חזק, lit. 'strong dot', i.e. 'gemination dagesh', or דגש כפלן, also 'dagesh forte') may be placed in almost any letter, indicating a gemination (doubling) of that consonant in the pronunciation of pre-modern Hebrew.

This gemination is not adhered to in modern Hebrew and is only used in careful pronunciation, such as the reading of scripture in a synagogue service, recitation of biblical or traditional texts or on ceremonial occasions, and only by very precise readers. However, the rules of the dagesh ḥazak still influence pronunciation in modern Hebrew, though not by gemination: in all cases where Biblical Hebrew geminates a letter, modern Hebrew retains a dagesh inside the letter, which influences pronunciation in the following way: in ב bet, כ kaf, and פ pe, it turns a fricative sound (vet, khaf, and fe) into a plosive sound (bet, kaf, and pe); in all other letters, it is not pronounced.

The following letters, the gutturals, almost never have a dagesh: aleph א, he ה, chet ח, ayin ע, and resh ר. A few instances of resh with dagesh are recorded in the Masoretic Text, as well as a few cases of aleph with dagesh, such as in Leviticus 23:17.

The presence of a dagesh ḥazak or consonant-doubling in a word may be entirely morphological, or, as is often the case, is a lengthening to compensate for a deleted consonant. A dagesh ḥazak may be placed in letters for one of the following reasons:

- The letter follows the definite article, the word "the". For example, שָׁמָיִם (shamayim, 'heaven(s)') in Genesis 1:8 is הַשָּׁמַיִם (hashshamayim, 'the heaven(s)') in Genesis 1:1. This is because the definite article was originally a stand-alone particle הַל (hal), but at an early stage in ancient Hebrew it contracted into a prefix הַ (ha-), and the loss of the ל 'l' was compensated for by doubling the following letter. In this situation where the following letter is a guttural, the vowel in 'ha-' becomes long to compensate for the inability to double the next letter—otherwise, this vowel is almost always short. This also happens in words taking the prefix לַ la-, since it is a prefix created by the contraction of לְ le- and הַ ha-. Occasionally, the letter following a he which is used to indicate a question may also receive a dagesh, e.g. Numbers 13:20 הַשְּׁמֵנָה הִוא (Hashshemena hi?, 'whether it is fat').
- The letter follows the prefix מִ mi- where this prefix is an abbreviation for the word מִן min, meaning 'from'. This is because, similarly to the case of the definite article above, the loss of the ן 'n' at the end of the abbreviated מִן min is compensated for by doubling the following letter. For example, the phrase "from your hand", if spelled as two words, would be מִן יָדֶךָ (min yadekha). In Genesis 4:11 however, it occurs as one word: מִיָּדֶךָ miyyadekha. This prefix mostly replaces the usage of the particle מִן min in modern Hebrew.
- The letter follows the prefix שֶׁ she- in modern Hebrew, which is a prefixed contraction of the relative pronoun אֲשֶׁר asher : the prefix's first letter is dropped and its last letter combines with the following word's first letter, which is therefore doubled and a dagesh ḥazak appears in it. For instance (Song of Songs 4:1), אֲשֶׁר+גָלְשׁוּ "who descend" becomes שֶׁגָּלְשׁוּ where the dot inside גּ indicates the letter has been doubled. This prefix is far less common than the full asher in Biblical texts, but mostly replaces it in Modern Hebrew.
- It marks the doubling of a letter that is caused by a weak letter losing its vowel. In these situations, the weak letter disappears, and the following letter is doubled to compensate for it. For example, compare Exodus 6:7 לָקַחְתִּי (lakachti) with Numbers 23:28, where the first letter of the root ל has been elided: וַיִּקַּח (vayyikkach). Lamed only behaves as a weak letter in this particular root word.
- If the letter follows a vav-consecutive imperfect (sometimes referred to as vav conversive, or vav ha'hipuch), which, in Biblical Hebrew, switches a verb between perfect and imperfect. For example, compare Judges 7:4 יֵלֵךְ (yelekh, 'let him go') with Deuteronomy 31:1 וַיֵּלֶךְ (vayyelekh, 'and he went'). A possible reason for this doubling is that the וַ (va-) prefix could be the remains of an auxiliary verb הָוַיַ (hawaya, the ancient form of the verb הָיָה hayah, 'to be') being contracted into a prefix, losing the initial ha, and the final ya syllable disappearing and doubling the next letter.
- In some of the binyan verbal stems, where the pi'el, pu'al and hitpa'el stems themselves cause doubling in the second root letter of a verb. For example:
  - Exodus 15:9 אֲחַלֵּק (achallek, 'I shall divide'), pi'el-stem, first person singular future tense
  - in the phrase הַלְּלוּ יָהּ (hallelu yah, 'praise the LORD'), where hallelu is in the pi'el-stem, masculine plural imperative form
  - Genesis 47:31 וַיִּתְחַזֵּק (vayyitchazzek, 'and he strengthened himself'), hitpa'el-stem

== Rafe ==
In Masoretic manuscripts the opposite of a dagesh would be indicated by a rafe, a small horizontal line on top of the letter. This is no longer found in Hebrew, but may still sometimes be seen in Yiddish and Ladino.

== Unicode encodings ==
In computer typography there are two ways to use a dagesh with Hebrew text. The following examples give the Unicode and numeric character references:

- Using combining characters:
  - bet + dagesh: בּ = U+05D1U+05BC or &#1489;&#1468;
  - kaf + dagesh: כּ = U+05DBU+05BC or &#1499;&#1468;
  - pe + dagesh: פּ = U+05E4U+05BC or &#1508;&#1468;
- Using precomposed characters:
  - bet with dagesh: בּ = U+FB31 or &#64305;
  - kaf with dagesh: כּ = U+FB3B or &#64315;
  - pe with dagesh: פּ = U+FB44 or &#64324;

Some fonts, character sets, encodings, and operating systems may support neither, one, or both methods.

== See also ==
- Shaddah, analogous to the dagesh hazak in written Arabic
- Hebrew spelling
- Yiddish spelling
- Ladino spelling
- Geresh
- Dakuten and Handakuten (Japanese equivalent)
