= Pisha paysha =

Card game

- Players: 2
- Skills: Counting
- Deck: Standard 52-card deck
- Chance: High

Related games
- Beggar-my-neighbour, kvitlech
- Website: Description

Pisha paysha (Yiddish: פּישע פּיישע, /ˌpɪʃə ˈpeɪʃə/) is a card game of Ashkenazi Jewish origin, similar to beggar-my-neighbour. It is typically played with children.

The Joys of Yiddish writes that the name is a corruption of the English card game "Pitch and Patience"
