= Haredi dialect =

Variety of Yiddish spoken in Israel

- עָגָה חרדית aga haredit
- Region: Israel
- Language family: Indo-European: Germanic; West Germanic; Elbe Germanic; High German; Yiddish; Haredi dialect

Language codes
- ISO 639-3: –

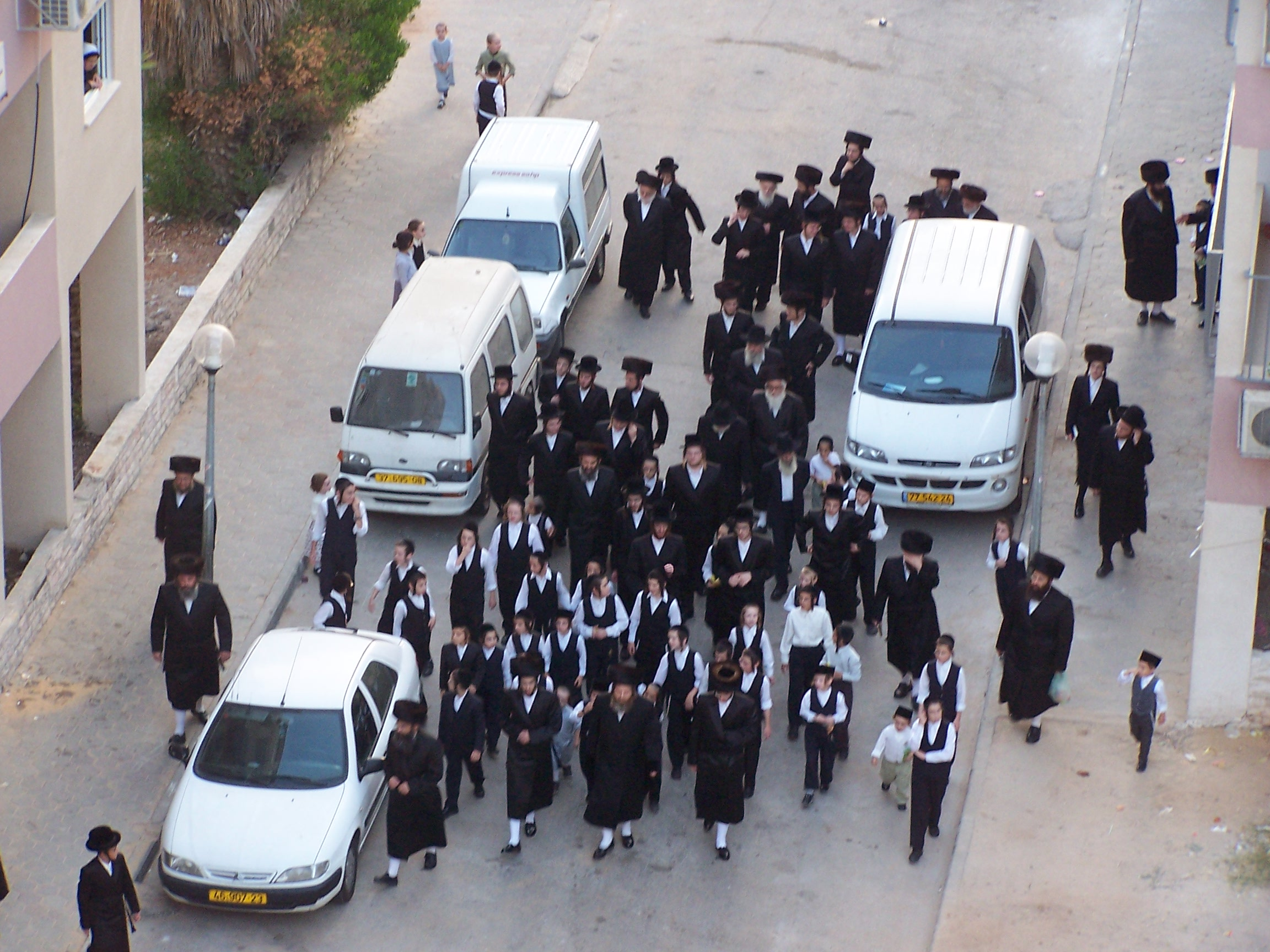
Haredi Jews on their way to synagogue, Rehovot, 2004

The Haredi dialect (Hebrew: עָגָה חרדית, romanized: aga haredit) is a vernacular spoken by Haredi communities in Israel. It evolved from "standard" pre-World War II varieties of Yiddish under the impact of the modern Hebrew, in particular of its phonology and lexicon. A great variability is observed in syntax, morphology, phonology, as well as lexicon among the Haredi communities. Their vernacular is preserved and evolved due to their unique conservative isolated way of life, with separate educational and public institutions. Most communities permit code switching between Haredi dialect and Hebrew, while some anti-Zionist Haredim reject Israeli Hebrew altogether.

Dalit Assouline of the University of Haifa did an extensive field study of Israeli Yiddish-speaking ultra-Orthodox communities, summarized in her monograph, Contact and Ideology in a Multilingual Community. She distinguishes several strains of Israeli Haredi Yiddish, in particular, Hasidic Yiddish (Yiddish: חסידישער ייִדיש, romanized: Hasidisher yidish), coming from central Yiddish dialects spoken by Polish and Hungarian Jews, and Jerusalemite Yiddish also called Litvish, coming from Northern Yiddish spoken by Litvaks (Lithuanian Jews). The strains of Haredi Yiddish derived from the other major group, the southeastern Yiddish, has a much smaller and diminishing representation, while the Hasidic Yiddish being the prevalent one.

The lexicon includes components of Yiddish, modern Hebrew, as well as Aramaic.

The term "Hasidic Yiddish" is also applicable to Hasidic communities elsewhere, e.g., in the United States.

== See also ==
- Yeshivish
- Yinglish
