= Klezmer-loshn =

Extinct derivative of Yiddish

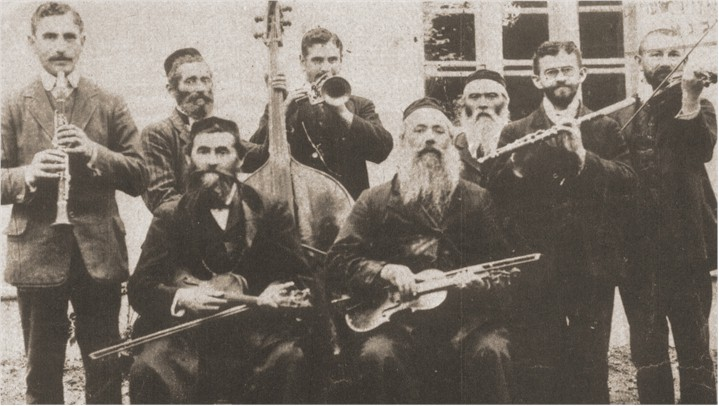

Klezmer-loshn (קלעזמער-לשון klezmer-loshn, Yiddish for Musician's Tongue) is an extinct derivative of the Yiddish language. It was a kind of argot, or cant used by travelling Jewish musicians, known as klezmorim (klezmers), in Eastern Europe prior to the 20th century.

It combined Yiddish with loanwords from many other European languages. This borrowed vocabulary was often substituted for key Yiddish words using rhyme or some other form of association. Many of the words were not derived from either Yiddish or Slavic languages, but original coinages.

As with other argots, such as thieves' languages, Klezmer-loshn evolved to fill the need of members of a bounded community to speak in the presence of others without being understood. Klezmorim could speak Klezmer-loshn during and after performances, whether among Gentiles or Yiddish-speaking Jews, without being understood. This allowed them to discuss business, plan, and even mock others without getting into trouble.

Its active use gradually dwindled in the 20th century, and disappeared along with the klezmer trade in Eastern Europe, especially after the Holocaust obliterated much of the Jewish population there.

The most detailed glossary of klezmer-loshn of over 600 words can be found in The Book of Klezmer: The History, The Music, The Folklore from the 14th Century to the 21st (A Capella Books, 2002, author Yale Strom).

== See also ==
- Yeshivish
- Yinglish
