= Yeshivish =

Sociolect of English spoken by Orthodox Jews in Yeshiva

Yeshivish (Yiddish: ישיבֿיש), also known as Yeshiva English, Yeshivisheh Shprach, or Yeshivisheh Reid, is a sociolect of English spoken by Yeshiva students and other Jews with a strong connection to the Orthodox Yeshiva world.

"Yeshivish" may also refer to non-Hasidic Haredi Jews. Sometimes it has an extra connotation of non-Hasidic Haredi Jews educated in yeshiva and whose education made a noticeable specific cultural impact onto them. In the latter case the term has ambivalent (both positive and negative) connotations comparable to those of the term "academic".

James Lambert writes that the term may be a portmanteau word of yeshiva and English, or may simply be formed from yeshiva + the adjectival suffix -ish.

== Research ==
The first serious study about Yeshivish is a master's thesis by Steven Ray Goldfarb (University of Texas at El Paso, 1979) called "A Sampling of Lexical Items in Yeshiva English." The work lists, defines, and provides examples for nearly 250 Yeshivish words and phrases. The second, more comprehensive work is Frumspeak: The First Dictionary of Yeshivish by Chaim Weiser. Weiser (1995) maintains that Yeshivish is not a pidgin, creole, or an independent language, nor is it precisely a jargon. Baumel (2006) following Weiser notes that Yeshivish differs from English primarily in phonemic structure, lexical meaning, and syntax.

Benor (2012) offers a detailed list of distinctive features used in Yeshivish. Katz describes it in Words on Fire: the Unfinished Story of Yiddish (2004) as a "new dialect of English", which is "taking over as the vernacular in everyday life in some ... circles in America and elsewhere". Heilman (2006) and others consider code-switching a part of Yeshivish. Though Kaye (1991) would exclude English speakers in the context of a Yeshiva, studying the Talmud, from code-switching where he considers the terms "Yiddish English" or "Yiddishized English" ("= Yinglish") may be more appropriate.

Benor (2019) stated that some scholars have argued Yeshivish constitutes its own Jewish language dialect variety comparable to Judeo-Arabic, Jewish Neo-Aramaic, and Judeo-Malayalam, which are or were co-territorial to their non-Jewish base language, and dissimilar to the "post-coterritorial" Jewish languages of Yiddish and Ladino.

== Patterns of usage ==
Yeshivish is primarily a male-spoken dialect. Fathers and sons, particularly of teenage years and above, might speak Yeshivish, while mothers and daughters generally speak a milder variety of it, which generally features Yeshivish phonology but excludes many Talmudic words. This can be explained as much of the Yeshivish lexicon is learned in Yeshiva where the studying takes place using specialist nomenclature. Familiarity with these terms develops and they are then re-applied to other situations. There is a higher incidence of Yeshivish being spoken amongst Orthodox Jews that are regularly involved in Torah study, or belong to a community that promotes its study.

Commonly used platitudes among Orthodox Jews are frequently expressed with their Yeshivish equivalent. Examples include using shkoyakh or shkoyekh for an expression of appreciation: "bravo" or "good job", or "thank you", a contraction from the Hebrew יִישַׁר כּוֹחַ "Yishar Ko'ach", which literally translates as "May your strength be firm" and is used to indicate to someone that they have done a good job, and Barukh HaShem (sometimes written as B"H, using the quotation mark used for abbreviations in Hebrew), meaning "Blessed is HaShem [The Name (of God)]". Yeshivish dialogue may include many expressions that refer to HaShem.

== See also ==
- Hebraization of English
- Klezmer-loshn
- Yiddish words used in English
- Jewish English Lexicon
- Haredi dialect

== Bibliography ==
- "Yeshivish, the language of Talmud Study" (PDF). Archived (PDF) from the original on 29 June 2011.
- "How to Speak Yeshivish". Zackary Sholem Berger. 15 April 2004.
- Weiser, Chaim M. (1995). Frumspeak: The first dictionary of Yeshivish. Northvale: Aronson. ISBN 978-1-56821-614-0.
