= Yiddish words used in English =

Words from the Yiddish Language used in everyday English

Yiddish words used in the English language include both words that have been assimilated into English – used by both Yiddish and English speakers – and many which have not. An English sentence that uses either may be described by some as Yinglish, though the second meaning of the term refers to the distinctive way certain Jews in English-speaking countries add many Yiddish words into their conversation, beyond common Yiddish words and phrases that entered English vocabulary.

Many of these words have not been assimilated into English and are unlikely to be understood by English speakers who do not have substantial Yiddish knowledge. Leo Rosten's book The Joys of Yiddish explains these words (and many more) in detail.

== Yinglish ==
Yinglish words (also referred to colloquially as Hebronics) are neologisms created by speakers of Yiddish in English-speaking countries, sometimes to describe things that were uncommon in the old country. Leo Rosten's book The Joys of Yiddish uses the words Yinglish and Ameridish to describe new words, or new meanings of existing Yiddish words, created by English-speaking persons with some knowledge of Yiddish. Rosten defines "Yinglish" as "Yiddish words that are used in colloquial English" (such as kibitzer) and Ameridish as words coined by Jews in the United States; his use, however, is sometimes inconsistent. According to his definition on page x, alrightnik is an Ameridish word; however, on page 12 it is identified as Yinglish.

While "Yinglish" is generally restricted in definition to the adaptation of Yiddish lemmas to English grammar by Jews, its usage is not explicitly restricted to Jews. This is especially true in areas where Jews are highly concentrated, but in constant interaction with their Gentile fellows, esp. in the larger urban areas of North America. In such circumstances, it would not be unusual to hear, for example, a Gentile griping about having "shlepped" a package across town. The portmanteau word Yinglish was first recorded in 1942. Similar colloquial portmanteau words for Yiddish influenced English include: Yidlish (recorded from 1967), Yiddiglish (1980), and Yenglish (2000). A number of other terms have been promulgated, such as Engdish and Engliddish, but these have not enjoyed widespread adoption.

As with Yiddish, Yinglish has no set transliteration standard; as the primary speakers of Yinglish are, by definition, Anglophones (whether first-language or not), Yinglish used in running speech tends to be transliterated using an English-based orthography. This, however, varies, sometimes in the same sentence. For instance, the word פֿאַרקאַקטע may be spelled farkakte, ferkockte, verkackte, fekakte among others. In its roots, though, Yiddish (whether used as English slang or not) descended from mediaeval High German; although mediaeval German suffered from the same vagaries in spelling, it later became standardised in Modern High German. This list shall use the same conventions as Modern High German, with the exception of certain words, the spellings of which have been standardised. Furthermore, common nouns shall be left lowercase, as in English.

The Jewish English Lexicon from Hebrew Union College is an extensive online index for Yinglish terms. Yinglish was formerly assigned the ISO 639-3 code yib, but it was retired on July 18, 2007, on the grounds that it is entirely intelligible with English.

== A ==
- aidim (Yid. איידעם): son-in-law, from middle-high-German eidam
- a schande (Yid. אַ שאַנדע): a disgrace; one who brings embarrassment through mere association, cf. German eine Schande, translated "a disgrace", meaning "such a shame"
- a schande far di goyim (Yid. אַ שאַנדע פֿאַר די גוים): "a disgrace before (in front of) the Gentiles", used as a Jewish insult against Jews who are perceived to further antisemitic stereotypes; also spelled in varied phonetic and Germanic ways as "a shanda fur di goyim", "a schande fur die goyim", and so forth; sometimes partially mistranslated as "a shande for the goyim", though far [sic] here means before and not for
- ay-ay-ay (Yid. אײַ־אײַ־אײַ) (sometimes spelled ai-yi-yi; spoken "ei, yei, yei")
- abi gezunt! (Yid. אַבי געזונט): The first word is Slavic: compare Ukrainian aby (аби), Belarusian aby (абы) and Polish oby, both meaning "if only", "hopefully". The second word is Germanic, cognate to High German gesund. The phrase thus means "As long as you're healthy!"; often used as an ironic punchline to a joke
- abi me lebt (Yid. אַבי מע לעבט): abi from Slavic, as in the previous entry; me lebt cognate to the German, man lebt, meaning "At least I'm alive"

== B ==
- billig or billik (Yid. ביליק): cheap, shoddy (said of merchandise); common expression "Billig is Teir" (cheap is expensive); as the German billig, "cheap"
- bissel (Yid. ביסל): a small amount, "a pinch of" something (cf. Austrian/Bavarian bissl, a dialectal variant of the more standard German bisschen, "a little bit")
- bentsch/bentsching (Yid. בענטשן): to bless, blessing; commonly referred to saying Birkat Hamazon (grace after meals) or when lighting shabbat candles (bentsch-light), from Latin, "benedicere", (to bless)
  - bentcher: a booklet with Birkat Hamazon and other prayers and songs associated with meal
- bubbameisse (Yid. באָבע־מעשׂה) old wives' tale, cock and bull story (often attributed by erroneous folk etymology to a combination of bubbe, "grandmother", and meisse, "tale", but in fact derives from "Bove-meisse", from the "Bove Bukh", the "Book of Bove", the chivalric adventures of fictitious knight Sir Bevys ("Bove") of Hampton, first published in Yiddish in 1541 and continually republished until 1910

== C ==
- chazerei/chazerai/chozerai (Yiddish, חזירײַ khazerai "filth" or, perhaps more literally, "piggery", from חזיר khazer "pig" from Hebrew חזיר "hazeer", pig): junk, garbage, junk food

== E ==
- ekht (Yid. עכט): real, true (from German echt, "real")
- emes (Yid. אמת): the truth. From Hebrew אמת emet, "truth"
- eppes (Yid. עפּעס) a little, not much, something; probably from Old High German eddeshwaz, with the eventual /-tw-/ assimilating into /-p-/; compare modern Swiss German and Bavarian dialects which have a rough equivalent ebbes
- ess (Yid. עס; "Iss!" German imperative for "Eat!"): to eat, especially used in the imperative: Ess! Ess!

== F ==
- fachnyok (Yid. פֿכניאָק): negative term meaning very religious, often used to connote someone holier-than-thou; can be shortened to "chenyok", or used as a noun ("don't be such a chenyok") or an adjective ("you're so chnyokish"); possibly derived from Russian хныка (khnyka)
- farblunjet (Yid. פֿאַרבלאָנדזשעט): confused, perplexed, totally lost
- farkakte (Yid. פֿאַרקאַקטע): screwed up, contemptible; literally "shat upon" (see verkackte)
- farklemt (Yid. פֿאַרקלעמט): choked up (with emotion) (cf. German verklemmt)
- farmisht (Yid. פֿאַרמישט): confused (cf. German vermischt = intermingled, mixed)
- farshtunken: contemptible, nasty (cf. German verstunken)
- feh (Yid. פֿע): expression of disgust
- feygele or faygeleh (Yid. פֿייגעלע): (pejorative) homosexual (literally 'little bird', from Old High German fogal; cf. modern German Vögele, also possible cf. German word Feigling, meaning 'coward'), could be used for anyone slightly effeminate, "Ugh, that Moishele washes his hands, what a feygele" often used as a disparaging term for a homosexual male
- fress (Yid. פֿרעסן): to eat, especially with enthusiasm (German fressen = "to eat like an animal, in an untidy way")
- frimmer (Yid. פֿרומר): (British English slang): a Hasidic Jew (from Yiddish "frum", religious; also cf. German "Frommer" = pious person)

== G ==
- gantz; gantze (Yid. גאַנץ): all, the whole of ("the ganze mischpache" = the whole family, etc., cf. German ganz = "whole, all")
- gei gesund (Yid. גיי געזונט gey gezunt): (from German) go in health; used as a goodbye; repeated in reply; usually neutral, but can be used sarcastically to mean "good riddance"
- gei avek (Yid. גיי אַוועק): go away, from German
- gei shlofen (Yid. גיי שלופֿן): (from German Geh schlafen) go [to] sleep
- gehivays (Yid. גיי ווייס): It means literally "go know", as in "go figure." ("Last week she said she hated his guts and now she's engaged to him, geh vays")
- genug (from German genug; Yiddish גענוג): enough
- geschmad, geschmadde (Yid. געשמד, from Hebrew משמד meshumad, "destroyed"): adjective meaning "(a Jew who) converted to Christianity"
- gewalt (Yid. געוואלד; It is from German Gewalt, violence): equivalent to "oi, weh" or "good grief!" literally "violence"
- glück (Yid. גליק, German): a piece of good luck
- gonef or gonif (Yid. גנבֿ, also ganiv): It means thief (Hebrew גנב ganav. It can be used as a somewhat generic insult, implying a "lowlife"): the word has also been adopted from Yiddish into German as Ganove; also a thief (often figurative)
- gornisht (Yid. גאָרנישט, from German gar nichts = nothing at all): nothing, not a bit, for naught
- goyisher mazel (Yid. גוייִשר מזל): good luck (lit. "Gentile luck"); mazel is from Hebrew מזל mazzal, referring to luck or fate
- graube (Yid. גרויב): (from German grobe, rough) coarsely or crudely made

== H ==
- hegdesch (Yid. העגדעש): pigpen, often used to describe a mess (as in "your room is a hegdesch")
- hock (Yid. האַק): It means to bother, pester (as in the character Major Hochstetter from Hogan's Heroes; a hockstetter being someone who constantly bothers you). The word is a contraction of the idiom Hakn a tshaynik (literally "to knock a teakettle"; Yiddish: האַקן אַ טשײַניק), from the old time pre-whistle teakettles whose tops clank against the rim as the pressure pushed them up and down. It is often partially translated in informal speech, as in, "Don't hock my tshaynik about it!" ("Don't pester me about it!")
- hocker (Yid. האַקר): botherer, pesterer (see above)

== K ==
- kadoches (Yid. קדחת): a fever; frequently occurs in oaths of ill-will (e.g., "I'll give him a kadoches is what I'll give him!); from Hebrew קדחת kedachat
- keppalah (Yid. קאפעלע): forehead, diminutive of keppe
- keppe (Yid. קאָפּ): head (e.g. "I needed that like a loch in keppe", i.e. a hole in my head); German "Kopf", coll. "Kopp": "head"; German "Loch": "hole"
- keyn ayn horeh (Yid. קיינ יינ-אָרע; also pronounced: kin ahurrah): lit., "No evil eye!"; German kein: none; Hebrew עין ayn—eye, הרע harrah—bad, evil; an apotropaic formula spoken to avert the curse of jealousy after something or someone has been praised
- khaloymes (Yid. כאָלעם): dreams, fantasies; used in the sense of "wild dreams" or "wishful thinking", as in "Ah, boy, that's just khaloymes, it'll never come true" from Hebrew חלום khalom (dream), pl. khalomot
- kife or kyfe (Yid. קייפ): enjoyment; from Arabo-Persian keyf 'opiate; intoxication; pleasure, enjoyment'
- klop (Yid. קלאַפּ): a loud bang or wallop (German klopfen = "to knock")
- klumnik (Yid. קלומניק): empty person, a good-for-nothing (From Hebrew כלום klum, nothing)
- krankhayt (Yid. קראַנקהייַט): a sickness (German Krankheit)

== L ==
- l'ch'oira: (Yid. לכוירה) "seemingly;" from Hebrew לכאורה lichora; ultimately from אור or, "light", as light is being shed on what has happened
- lobbus: a rascal, or young mischievous person; from לאָבעס lobes, לאָבוס lobus "urchin, young rascal"
- luzim (Yid. לאָזן): let it go, forget about it, from Old High German lazan, "let, allow;" famously used by the "Indians" in Blazing Saddles, where Mel Brooks says luzim gayen (לאָזן גיין), "let him go"

== M ==
- maiseh (Yid. מעשׂה): It literally means "deed, occurrence", a story or vignette about a person or event, (Heb. ma'aseh (same meaning as in Yiddish, though infrequently used). A small problem which blew up into a big story would be called a "ganze maiseh". It is also famous in the phrase a "bubbe maiseh", the equivalent of the English idiom "an old wives' tale".
- mamish (Yid. ממש): really, very (an expression of emphasis); from the Hebrew ממש (mamash), "substantially"
- maydl (Yid. מײדל): It means a girl, young woman, from Austrian Maedel. "That's a shayne (pretty) maydl."
- mazel (from Hebrew מזל mazal): luck (literally, constellation of stars)
- mechaye (Yid. מחיה): a source of pleasure (from the Hebrew חיים "chayim", meaning "life")
- mechutanista (f), mechutan (m), mechutanim (pl), Machtainista (f): kinship term for one's child's female or male parent-in-law (Yid. מעחוטאַניסטאַ, from Hebrew מחותן mekhután, "belonging to the groom")
- meh, mnyeh: an expression of indifference or boredom
- meiven (a variant of maven): expert (from Yiddish מבֿין meyvn, from Hebrew mevin "one who understands")
- mishegoss: a crazy, mixed up, insane situation; irrationality (from Yiddish משוגעת meshugas, from meshuge 'crazy')

== P ==
- pulke (Yid. פולקע): thigh, particularly fat ones on babies; from Russian пол (pol), "half"
- punkt farkert (Yid. פונקט פארקערט): just the opposite, total disagreement; German: punkt verkehrt; lit "point/precisely false/backward" = wrong
- pupik (Yid. פּופּיק): the navel; belly button (Polish pępek, navel) (used by American comedian Moe Howard in You Nazty Spy!, a short subject film from 1940)

== S ==
- schicker (Yid. שיכור shikhur) or schickered: drunk, intoxicated (from the Hebrew שיכור shikor: drunk, cf. German [coll.] angeschickert "soused, tipsy")
- schissel or shisl (Yid. שיסל): bowl, especially a large mixing bowl (from German Schüssel, bowl)
- schlemiel: It means an incompetent or inept person or fool.
- schlepper: bum (Yiddish שלעפּר shlepr and German schleppen)
- schlep: (Yid. שלעפּן) It literally means to drag or to pull. It is both a verb and a noun. It also conveys a sense of inconvenience as in performing a task which is inconvenient or boring. Another example is making a long or tedious journey.
- schlimazel: It means a consistently unlucky or accident-prone person.
- schmeckle (Yid. שמעקל): a little penis, often ascribed to a baby boy; diminutive of שמאָק shmok, "penis"
- schrai (Yid. שרײ): It means a shriek or wail, sometimes used to connote exaggerated hysterics. ("When I told her I'd be ten minutes late, she let out such a shrai!") (cf. German Schrei)
- schtick: It means a comic routine, gimmick, repetitious performance, or comic theme.
- schtick'l: It means a little piece of something, usually food. It is a dimunitive of stick, from German Stückchen. In "delis", salami ends were sold from a plate on the counter labeled "A nickel a schtickel"
- schtupp, schtuff: (vulgar) It means to have sex with, screw (from Yiddish שטופּן shtupn 'push, poke'; similar to 'stuff'); to fill, as in to fill someone's pocket with money. ("Schtupp him $50.") It is frequently used in the former context by Triumph the Insult Comic Dog. In German 'stopfen' means to (overly) fill or to stuff something.
- schverr (Yid. שװער): father-in-law (German Schwager, obsolete form "Schwäher")
- schvigger (Yid. שװיגער): mother-in-law (German Schwiegermutter)
- Shabbos goy: It means a non-Jew who performs labor forbidden on the Jewish Sabbath for observant Jews; sometimes used (by implication) for someone who "does the dirty work" for another person. (from Yiddish שבת Shabbos, Sabbath and גױ goy, a non-Jew)
- shep naches (Yid. שעפּ נחת): It means to take pride and is sometimes shortened to "shep". ("Your son got into medical school? You must be shepping.") It is from שעפּן (shepn), "derive", from Old High German scaphan; and Hebrew נחת nachat, "contentment".
- sheyne meydel (Yid. שײנע מײדל): a beautiful girl (cf. German schönes Mädel)
- Shiva (Yid. שבעה shive): It means the mourning of seven days after one dies by his family and is from Hebrew שבעה shiv'a, "seven".
- schlemiel (Yid. שמעגעגע): It means a stupid person, a truly unlucky one. (He cleaned up the soup the shmegegge or schlemiel spilled on the schlimazel.)
- shpilkes (Yid. שפּילקעס): nervous energy; to be feeling "antsy", to be "sitting on pins and needles;" Cf. Polish szpilka, "pin"
- shtark (Yid. שטאַרק), shtarker: strong, brave (German stark), zealously religious
- shtick: comic theme; a defining habit or distinguishing feature (from Yiddish שטיק shtik, 'a piece of something': cf. German Stück, "piece")
- shtotty (Yid. שטאָטי): It means fancy or elegant and may sometimes be pejorative. ("She thinks she's so shtotty with that new dress of hers.")
- shtuch (Yid. שטוך): It means to put someone down, often facetiously ("I shtuched him out." It can be used as a noun to refer to a clever put-down or rejoinder. ("When I told my father that my stupidity must be hereditary, it was such a good shtuch!")
- shtick dreck (Yid. שטיק דרעק): It literally means "a piece of dirt" (see dreck), but usually applied to a person who is hated because of the antisocial things he has done. "He's a real shtick dreck." possibly shtick dreck: a piece of crap; Cf. German Stück Dreck
- shtuss (Yid. שטות): It means nonsense, foolishness (from Hebrew שטות shetut, pl. shetuyot). It is also the name of a card game. In German, 'Stuss' means nonsense.
- shvartze or shvartzer: (שװאַרצער): Black person (either neutral or possibly derogatory depending on context) (from שװאַרץ shvarts "black", German schwarz)

== T ==
- takeh (Yid. טאַקע): It means really, totally. "This is takeh a problem!" It is from Russian/Ukrainian таки (taki), "still, after all, in spite of".
- tchepen sikh (Yid. טשעפּען זיך tshepen zikh): It means to bother someone incessantly ("Stop tcheppening me!") or to playfully banter with someone ("We spent the entire date tcheppening each other about what bad taste the other one had.") It is from Polish czepiać sie, "cling to, find fault with".
- tornig (Yid. טורניג): a disobedient nephew
- tsim gezunt (Yid. צים געזונט): It means to [your] health! It is used as a response to a sneeze; from German gesund, "healthy.")
- Tsekruchen (adj.): It means to be bent over, to be dejected. "Don't be so tsekruchen all the time, lighten up a bit"
- tummel (Yid. טאַמעל): excitement (cf. German tummeln, "to romp")
- tummler (noun): It means an instigator or person who makes things happen. Often it means a professional entertainer or comedian who gets a crowd involved in a performance.

== V ==
- verblandzhet (Yid. פֿאַרבלאָנדזשעט; far- cf. German ver- and Polish błądzić : It means "to stray around"): lost, bewildered, confused, mixed-up (appropriately, there are several variant spellings)
- verdreyt (Yid. פֿאַרדרײט; drey meaning turn, cf. dreidel; also cf. German verdreht = "twisted"): confused, mixed-up, distracted
- verfrumt (Yid. פֿאַרפֿרומט): It is a negative term for someone very religious or pious. "She came back from seminary and became all farfrumt." It is from Old High German fruma, cognate to German fromm.
- vershimmelt (Yid. פֿאַרשימלט farshmilt): It means shook up, rattled, in a state of nerves. "She wasn't hurt in the accident, but she was pretty farshimmelt". (cf. German verschimmelt = moldy)
- verkakte (Yid. פֿאַרקאַקטע): an adjective, meaning 'screwed up' or 'a bad idea'; literally, 'crapped' or 'becrapped', cf. German "verkackte(r)"
- vershtuft (Yid. פֿאַרשטופֿט farshtuft): (pejorative) pregnant, recently had sex, constipated; (stuffed); (cf. German "verstopft"= blocked)

== W ==
- wilde chaya (Yid. װילדע חיה vilde chaye): It means an impolite or undisciplined child, literally, a wild beast. It is from Old High German wildi and Hebrew חייה (ḥaye, "animal").

== Y ==
- Yiddishe Mama (Yid. ײִדישע מאַמאַ): a stereotypical Jewish mother
- Yiddisher kop (Yid. ײִדישער קאָפּ): intelligence (lit. "Jewish head"; German "Jüdischer Kopf": Jewish head)
- yiddisher mazel (Yid. ײִדישער מזל): bad luck (lit. "Jewish luck"); from Hebrew מזל mazal, "constellation"
- yungatch (Yid. יונגאַטש yungatsh): a rascal; from יונג yung (OHG junc)

== Yinglish words ==
The Joys of Yiddish says these words are Yinglish except where noted as being Ameridish:

- alrightnik, alrightnikeh, alrightnitseh – male, female, female individual who has been successful; nouveau riche
- bleib shver – from German bleibt schwer, meaning remains difficult – unresolved problem, especially in Talmud learning (cf. wikt:תיקו)
- blintz (Yinglish because the true Yiddish is blintzeh)
- bluffer, blufferkeh – male, female person who bluffs
- boarderkeh, bordekeh – (Ameridish) female paying boarder
- boychick, boychikel, boychiklekh – young boy, kiddo, handsome
- bulbenik (Ameridish) – an actor who muffs his lines, from bilbul – mixup (alternative theory – bulba, literally potato, figuratively error)
- bummerkeh (Ameridish) – a female bum
- chutzpah (Ameridish) – audacity
- cockamamy false, ersatz, crazy (of an idea), artificial, jury-rigged (prob. from Eng. "decalcomania", a "decal", a sticker, a cheap process for transferring images from paper to glass.) In the Bronx, in the first half of the 20th century, a "cockamamie" was a washable temporary "tattoo" distributed in bubblegum packets.
- donstairsikeh, donstairsiker – female, male living downstairs
- dresske – bargain-basement dress
- fin – five, or five-dollar bill, shortened form of Yiddish פינף finif (five)
- kosher – Yinglish, not in its religious or Yiddish meanings, but only in five slang senses: authentic, trustworthy, legitimate, fair, and approved by a higher source. Its pronunciation, as "kōsher", is another distinguishing factor, as in true Yiddish it is pronounced "kūsher" or "kösher"
- mensch – a person of uncommon maturity and decency
- nextdoorekeh, nextdooreker – female, male living next door
- opstairsikeh, opstairsiker (Ameridish) – female, male living upstairs
- pisha paysha – corruption of English card game "Pitch and Patience"
- sharopnikel (Ameridish) – a small object that causes quieting, such as a pacifier, teething ring, cf. shaddap (shut up!)
- shmata – everyday clothing (literally "rags")
- shmegegge (Ameridish) – an unadmirable or untalented person
- shmo – shortened version of 'shmock' or 'shmearal', see 'shnuk'
- shnuk (Ameridish) – an idiotic person
- tararam – a big tummel
- tuchas – buttocks

== See also ==
- List of English words of Hebrew origin
- List of German expressions in English
- List of English words of Yiddish origin
- Lists of English words by country or language of origin
- Jewish English Lexicon
- Yeshivish
- Scots-Yiddish
