= Yiddish =

West Germanic language spoken by Ashkenazi Jews

- Judeo-German
- ייִדיש, יידיש, אידיש yidish, idish
- Pronunciation: [ˈ(j)ɪdɪʃ]
- Native to: Central, Eastern, and Western Europe
- Region: Europe, Israel, North America, South America, other regions with Jewish populations
- Ethnicity: Ashkenazi Jews
- Native speakers: ≤ 600,000 (2021)
- Language family: Indo-European: Germanic; West Germanic; Elbe Germanic; High German; Yiddish
- Early form: Old High German: Middle High German
- Dialects: Eastern Yiddish; Western Yiddish; Klezmer-loshn †
- Writing system: Hebrew alphabet (Yiddish orthography) occasionally Latin alphabet

Official status
- Official language in: Russia (Jewish Autonomous Oblast)
- Recognised minority language in: Israel; Belarus; Netherlands; Poland; Sweden; Ukraine; Romania; Russia
- Regulated by: No formal bodies YIVO (de facto)

Language codes
- ISO 639-1: yi
- ISO 639-2: yid
- ISO 639-3: yid – inclusive code Individual codes: ydd – Eastern Yiddish yih – Western Yiddish
- Glottolog: east2295 Eastern Yiddish west2361 Western Yiddish
- Linguasphere: 52-ACB-g

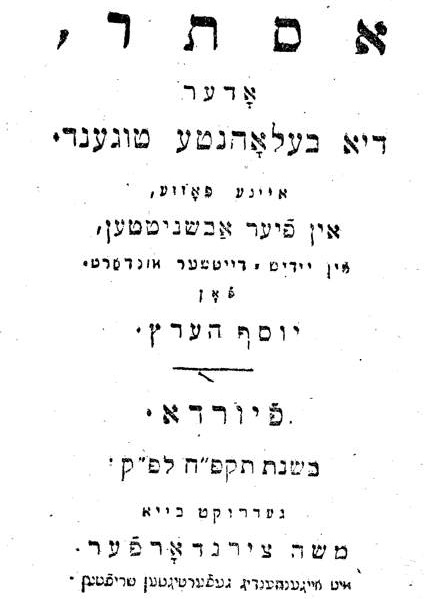
The opening page of the 1828 Yiddish-written Jewish holiday of Purim play Esther, oder die belohnte Tugend from Fürth (by Nürnberg), Bavaria

Yiddish, (Note: ייִדיש, יידיש or אידיש, romanized as yidish or idish, pronounced [ˈ(j)ɪdɪʃ]; lit. 'Jewish') historically referred to as Judeo-German or Jewish German, (Note: ייִדיש־טײַטש, Yidish-Taytsh, pronounced [ˈ(j)ɪdɪʃ ˌtaɪtʃ]) is a West Germanic language and Jewish ethnolect historically spoken by Ashkenazi Jews. It originated in the Holy Roman Empire during the Middle Ages, and provided the nascent Ashkenazi community with a vernacular based on High German, fused with many elements taken from Hebrew (notably Mishnaic Hebrew) and to some extent Aramaic. Most varieties of Yiddish include elements of Slavic languages and the vocabulary contains traces of Romance languages. Yiddish has traditionally been written using the Hebrew alphabet.

For centuries, Yiddish was the vernacular of Ashkenazi communities. Starting in the late 18th century, under the sway of the Haskalah (Jewish Enlightenment), the language suffered decreasing prestige, being stigmatized by assimilationists and later also by Zionists, in favor of national languages and Hebrew. Efforts by the Yiddishist movement to counter that trend had limited success. Nevertheless, before World War II, the language still counted 11–13 million speakers. Some 85% of the approximately six million Jews who were murdered in the Holocaust were Yiddish speakers, resulting in a massive decline in use of the language. This, together with further assimilation following World War II, along with aliyah (immigration to Israel), sped up the process of language shift to national tongues and Modern Hebrew, particularly among secular Jews.

The number of Yiddish speakers is, however, on the rise in Haredi (ultra-Orthodox) communities. In 2014, YIVO stated that "most people who speak Yiddish in their daily lives are Hasidim and other Haredim", whose population was estimated at the time to be between 500,000 and 1 million. A 2021 estimate from Rutgers University was that there were 250,000 American speakers, 250,000 Israeli speakers, and 100,000 speakers in the rest of the world (for a total of 600,000).

The earliest surviving references date from the 12th century and call the language לשון־אַשכּנז (loshn-ashknaz; lit. 'language of Ashkenaz') or טײַטש (taytsh), a variant of tiutsch, the contemporary name for Middle High German. Colloquially, the language is sometimes called מאַמע־לשון (mame-loshn; lit. 'mother tongue'), distinguishing it from לשון־קודש (loshn koydesh; lit. 'holy tongue'), meaning Hebrew, and תרגום-לשון (targum loshn; lit. 'translation tongue'), meaning Aramaic. (Note: In particular, L. L. Zamenhof, a Litvak Jew from Congress Poland and the initiator of Esperanto, often mentioned his fondness for what he called his mama-loshen (it had not yet been called Yiddish but usually jargon at that time and place) in his correspondence.) The term "Yiddish", short for "Yidish-Taitsh" ('Jewish German'), did not become the most frequently used designation in the literature until the 18th century. In the late 19th and into the 20th century, the language was more commonly called "Jewish", especially in non-Jewish contexts, but "Yiddish" is again the most common designation today.

Modern Yiddish has two major dialect groups: Eastern and Western. Eastern Yiddish is far more common today. It includes Southeastern, or Ukrainish (Ukrainian–Romanian); Mideastern, or Poylish (Polish–Galician–Eastern Hungarian); and Northeastern, or Litvish (Lithuanian–Belarusian) dialects. Eastern Yiddish differs from Western Yiddish both by its far greater size and the extensive inclusion of words of Slavic origin. Western Yiddish is divided into Southwestern (Swiss–Alsatian–Southern German), Midwestern (Central German), and Northwestern (Netherlandic–Northern German) dialects. Ethnologue classifies Western Yiddish as endangered.

The term "Yiddish" is also used in the adjectival sense, synonymously with "Ashkenazi Jewish", to designate attributes of Yiddishkeit ("Ashkenazi culture"; for example, Yiddish cooking and music).

== History ==
=== Origins ===
By the 10th century, a distinctive Jewish culture had formed in Central Europe. By the high medieval period, their area of settlement, centered on the Rhineland (Mainz) and the Palatinate (notably Worms and Speyer), came to be known as Ashkenaz, a term also used for Scythia, and later of various areas of Eastern Europe and Anatolia. In the medieval Hebrew of Rashi (d. 1105), Ashkenaz becomes a term for Germany and Ashkenazi (אשכּנזי) for the Jews settling in this area. Ashkenaz bordered on the area inhabited by another distinctive Jewish cultural group, the Sephardi Jews, who ranged into southern France. Ashkenazi culture later spread into Eastern Europe with large-scale population migrations.

Nothing is known with certainty about the vernacular of the earliest Jews in Germany, but several theories have been put forward. As noted above, the first language of the Ashkenazim may have been Aramaic, the vernacular of the Jews in Roman-era Judea and ancient and early medieval Mesopotamia. The widespread use of Aramaic among the large non-Jewish Syrian trading population of the Roman provinces, including those in Europe, would have reinforced the use of Aramaic among Jews engaged in trade. In Roman times, many of the Jews living in Rome and Southern Italy appear to have been Greek-speakers, and this is reflected in some Ashkenazi personal names (such as Kalonymos and Yiddish Todres). Hebrew, on the other hand, was regarded as a holy language reserved for ritual and spiritual purposes and not for common use.

The established view is that, as with other Jewish languages, Jews speaking distinct languages learned new co-territorial vernaculars, which they then Judaized. In the case of Yiddish, this scenario sees it as emerging when speakers of Zarphatic (Judeo-French) and other Judeo-Romance languages began to acquire varieties of Middle High German, and from these groups the Ashkenazi community took shape. Exactly what German substrate underlies the earliest form of Yiddish is disputed. The Jewish community in the Rhineland would have encountered the Middle High German dialects from which the Rhenish German dialects of the modern period would emerge. Jewish communities of the high medieval period would have been speaking their own versions of these German dialects, mixed with linguistic elements that they themselves brought into the region, including many Hebrew and Aramaic words, but there is also Romance.

In Max Weinreich's model, Jewish speakers of Old French or Old Italian who were literate in either liturgical Hebrew or Aramaic, or both, migrated through Southern Europe to settle in the Rhine Valley in an area known as Lotharingia (later known in Yiddish as Loter) extending over parts of Germany and France. There, they encountered and were influenced by Jewish speakers of High German languages and several other German dialects. Both Weinreich and Solomon Birnbaum developed this model further in the mid-1950s. In Weinreich's view, this Old Yiddish substrate later bifurcated into two distinct versions of the language, Western and Eastern Yiddish. They retained the Semitic vocabulary and constructions needed for religious purposes and created a Judeo-German form of speech, sometimes not accepted as a fully autonomous language.

Yiddish was a rich, living language, the chattering tongue of an urban population. It had the limitations of its origins. There were few Yiddish words for animals and birds. It had virtually no military vocabulary. Such voids were filled by borrowing from German, Polish and Russian. Yiddish was particularly good at borrowing: from Arabic, from Hebrew, from Aramaic and from anything with which it intersected. On the other hand, it contributed to English — American. [sic] Its chief virtue lay in its internal subtlety, particularly in its characterization of human types and emotions. It was the language of street wisdom, of the clever underdog, of pathos, resignation and suffering, all of which it palliated by humor, intense irony and superstition. Isaac Bashevis Singer, its greatest practitioner, pointed out that it is the only language never spoken by men in power.

— Paul Johnson, A History of the Jews (1988)

Later linguistic research has refined the Weinreich model or provided alternative approaches to the language's origins, with points of contention being the characterization of its Germanic base, the source of its Hebrew/Aramaic adstrata, and the means and location of this fusion. Some theorists argue that the fusion occurred with a Bavarian dialect base. The two main candidates for the germinal matrix of Yiddish, the Rhineland and Bavaria, are not necessarily incompatible. There may have been parallel developments in the two regions, seeding the Western and Eastern dialects of Modern Yiddish. Dovid Katz proposes that Yiddish emerged from contact between speakers of High German and Aramaic-speaking Jews from the Middle East. The lines of development proposed by the different theories do not necessarily rule out the others (at least not entirely); an article in The Forward argues that "in the end, a new 'standard theory' of Yiddish's origins will probably be based on the work of Weinreich and his challengers alike."

Paul Wexler proposed a model in 1991 that took Yiddish, by which he means primarily eastern Yiddish, not to be genetically grounded in a Germanic language at all, but rather as "Judeo-Sorbian" (a proposed West Slavic language) that had been relexified by High German. In more recent work, Wexler has argued that Eastern Yiddish is unrelated genetically to Western Yiddish. Wexler's model has been met with little academic support, and strong critical challenges, especially among historical linguists.

=== Written evidence ===
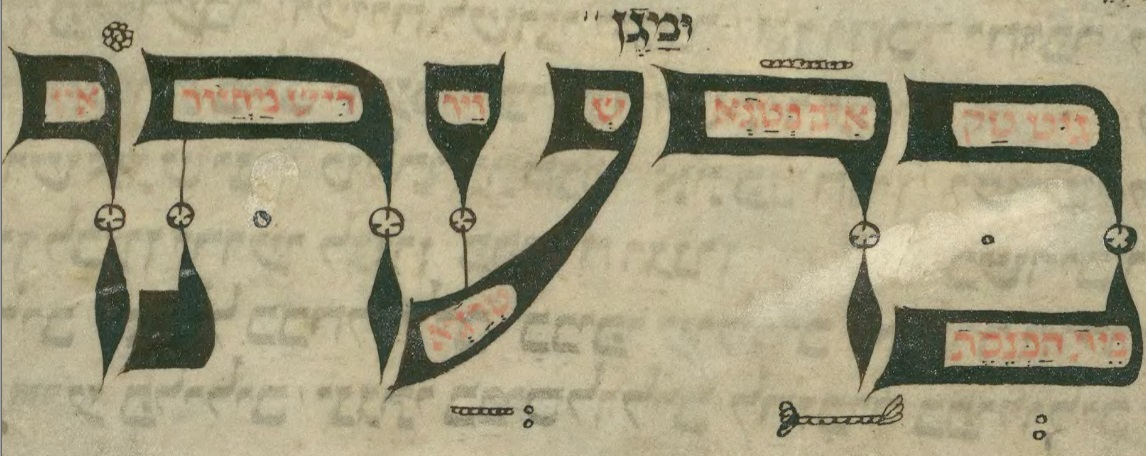
The calligraphic segment in the Worms Machzor (a Hebrew prayer book). The Yiddish text is in red.

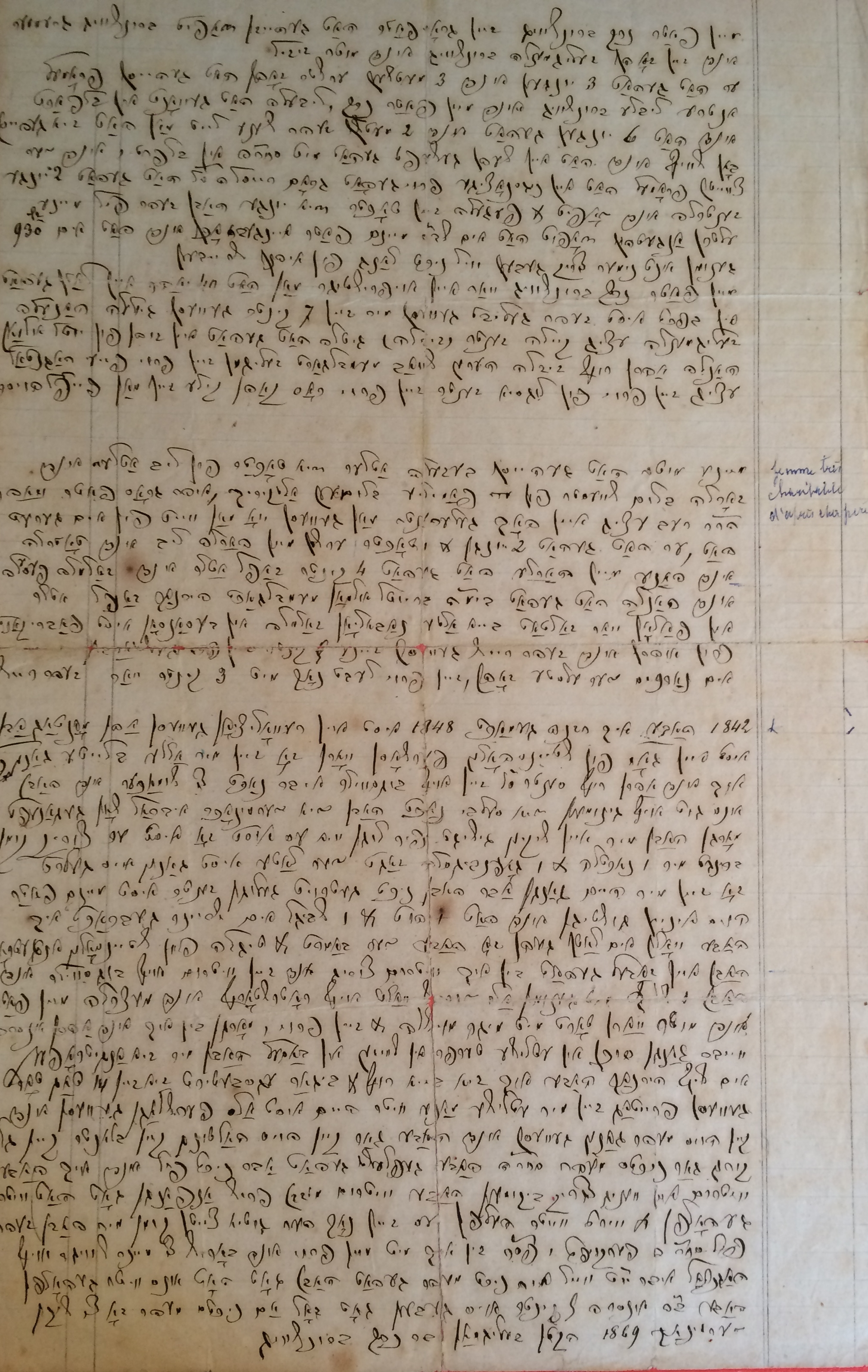
The South-West Yiddish account of the life of Seligmann Brunschwig von Dürmenach describes, among other things, the anti-Semitic events of the revolutionary year 1848. In the collection of the Jewish Museum of Switzerland.

Yiddish orthography developed towards the end of the High Medieval period. It is first recorded in 1272, with the oldest surviving literary document in Yiddish, a blessing found in the Worms machzor (a Hebrew prayer book).

A Yiddish phrase transliterated and translated
Yiddish	גוּט טַק אִים בְּטַגְֿא שְ וַיר דִּיש מַחֲזוֹר אִין בֵּיתֿ הַכְּנֶסֶתֿ טְרַגְֿא
Transliterated	gut tak im betage se vaer dis makhazor in beis hakneses trage
Translated	May a good day come to him who carries this prayer book into the synagogue.

This brief rhyme is decoratively embedded in an otherwise purely Hebrew text. Nonetheless, it indicates that the Yiddish of that day was a more or less regular Middle High German written in the Hebrew alphabet into which Hebrew words – מַחֲזוֹר, makhzor (prayerbook for the High Holy Days) and בֵּיתֿ הַכְּנֶסֶתֿ, 'synagogue' (read in Yiddish as beis hakneses) – had been included. The niqqud appears as though it might have been added by a second scribe, in which case it may need to be dated separately and may not be indicative of the pronunciation of the rhyme at the time of its initial annotation.

Over the 14th and 15th centuries, songs and poems in Yiddish, and macaronic pieces in Hebrew and German, began to appear. These were collected in the late 15th century by Menahem ben Naphtali Oldendorf. During the same period, a tradition seems to have emerged of the Jewish community's adapting its own versions of German secular literature. The earliest Yiddish epic poem of this sort is the Dukus Horant, which survives in the famous Cambridge Codex T.-S.10.K.22. This 14th-century manuscript was discovered in the Cairo Geniza in 1896, and also contains a collection of narrative poems on themes from the Hebrew Bible and the Haggadah.

=== Printing ===
The advent of the printing press in the 16th century enabled the large-scale production of works at a cheaper cost, some of which have survived. One particularly popular work was Elia Levita's Bovo-Bukh (בָּבָֿא־בּוך), composed around 1507–08 and printed several times, beginning in 1541 (under the title Bovo d'Antona). Levita, the earliest named Yiddish author, may also have written פּאַריז און װיענע Pariz un Viene (Paris and Vienna). Another Yiddish retelling of a chivalric romance, װידװילט Vidvilt (often referred to as "Widuwilt" by Germanizing scholars), presumably also dates from the 15th century, although the manuscripts are from the 16th. It is also known as Kinig Artus Hof, an adaptation of the Middle High German romance Wigalois by Wirnt von Grafenberg. Another significant writer is Avroham ben Schemuel Pikartei, who published a paraphrase on the Book of Job in 1557.

Women in the Ashkenazi community were traditionally not literate in Hebrew but did read and write Yiddish. A body of literature therefore developed for which women were a primary audience. This included secular works, such as the Bovo-Bukh, and religious writing specifically for women, such as the צאנה וראינה Tseno Ureno and the תחנות Tkhines. One of the best-known early woman authors was Glückel of Hameln, whose memoirs are still in print.

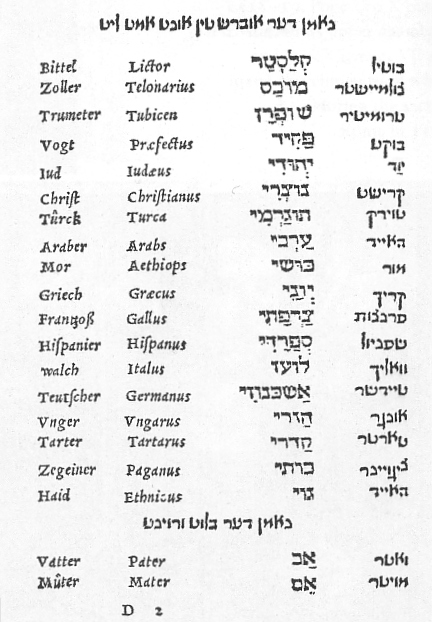
A page from the Shemot Devarim (lit. 'Names of Things'), a Yiddish–Hebrew–Latin–German dictionary and thesaurus, published by Elia Levita in 1542

The segmentation of the Yiddish readership, between women who read מאַמע־לשון mame-loshn but not לשון־קדש loshn-koydesh, and men who read both, was significant enough that distinctive typefaces were used for each. The name commonly given to the semicursive form used exclusively for Yiddish was ווײַבערטײַטש (vaybertaytsh, 'women's taytsh', shown in the heading and fourth column in the Shemot Devarim), with square Hebrew letters (shown in the third column) being reserved for text in that language and Aramaic. This distinction was retained in general typographic practice through to the early 19th century, with Yiddish books being set in vaybertaytsh (also termed מעשייט mesheyt or מאַשקעט mashket—the construction is uncertain).

An additional distinctive semicursive typeface was, and still is, used for rabbinical commentary on religious texts when Hebrew and Yiddish appear on the same page. This is commonly termed Rashi script, from the name of the most renowned early author, whose commentary is usually printed using this script. (Rashi is also the typeface normally used when the Sephardic counterpart to Yiddish, Judeo-Spanish or Ladino, is printed in Hebrew script.)

According to a study by the German media association Internationale Medienhilfe (IMH), more than 40 printed Yiddish newspapers and magazines were published worldwide in 2024, and the trend is rising.

=== Secularization ===
The Western Yiddish dialect—sometimes pejoratively labeled Mauscheldeutsch, i. e. "Moses German"—declined in the 18th century, as the Age of Enlightenment and the Haskalah led to a view of Yiddish as a corrupt dialect. The 19th-century Prussian-Jewish historian Heinrich Graetz, for example, wrote that "the language of the Jews [in Poland] ... degenerat[ed] into a ridiculous jargon, a mixture of German, Polish, and Talmudical elements, an unpleasant stammering, rendered still more repulsive by forced attempts at wit."

A Maskil (one who takes part in the Haskalah) would write about and promote acclimatization to the outside world. Jewish children began attending secular schools where the primary language spoken and taught was German, not Yiddish.

Yiddish grates on our ears and distorts. This jargon is incapable in fact of expressing sublime thoughts. It is our obligation to cast off these old rags, a heritage of the dark Middle Ages.

— Osip Aronovich Rabinovich, in an article titled "Russia – Our Native Land: Just as We Breathe Its Air, We Must Speak Its Language" in the Odessan journal Рассвет (dawn), 1861

Owing to both assimilation to German and the revival of Hebrew, Western Yiddish survived only as a language of "intimate family circles or of closely knit trade groups".

In Eastern Europe, the response to these forces took the opposite direction, with Yiddish becoming the cohesive force in a secular culture (see the Yiddishist movement). Notable Yiddish writers of the late 19th and early 20th centuries are Sholem Yankev Abramovitch, writing as Mendele Mocher Sforim; Sholem Rabinovitsh, widely known as Sholem Aleichem, whose stories about טבֿיה דער מילכיקער (Tevye der milkhiker, "Tevye the Milkman") inspired the Broadway musical and film Fiddler on the Roof; and Isaac Leib Peretz.

=== 20th century ===
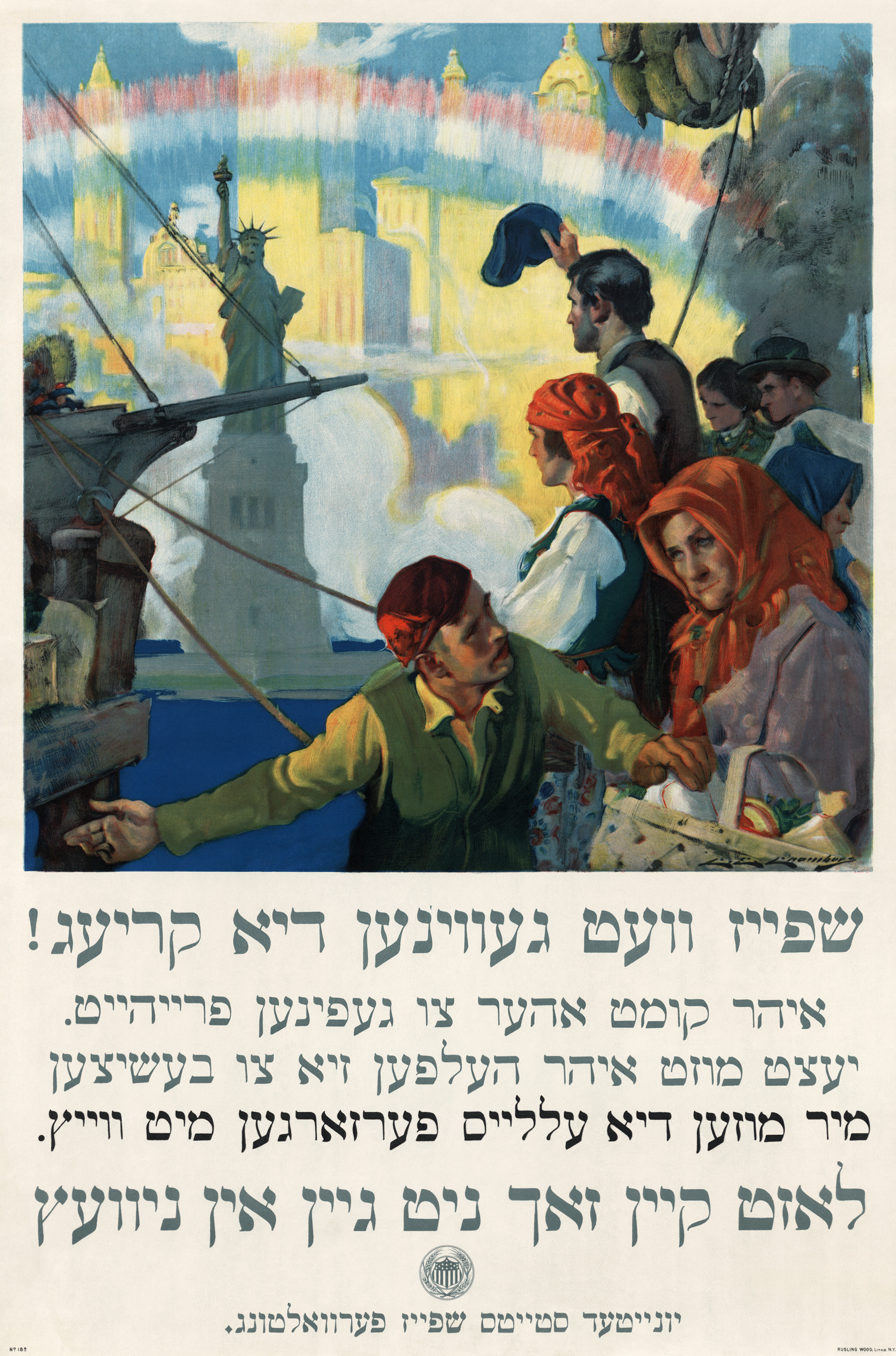
American World War I-era poster in Yiddish. Translated caption: "Food will win the war – You came here seeking freedom, now you must help to preserve it – We must supply the Allies with wheat – Let nothing go to waste". Color lithograph, 1917. Digitally restored.

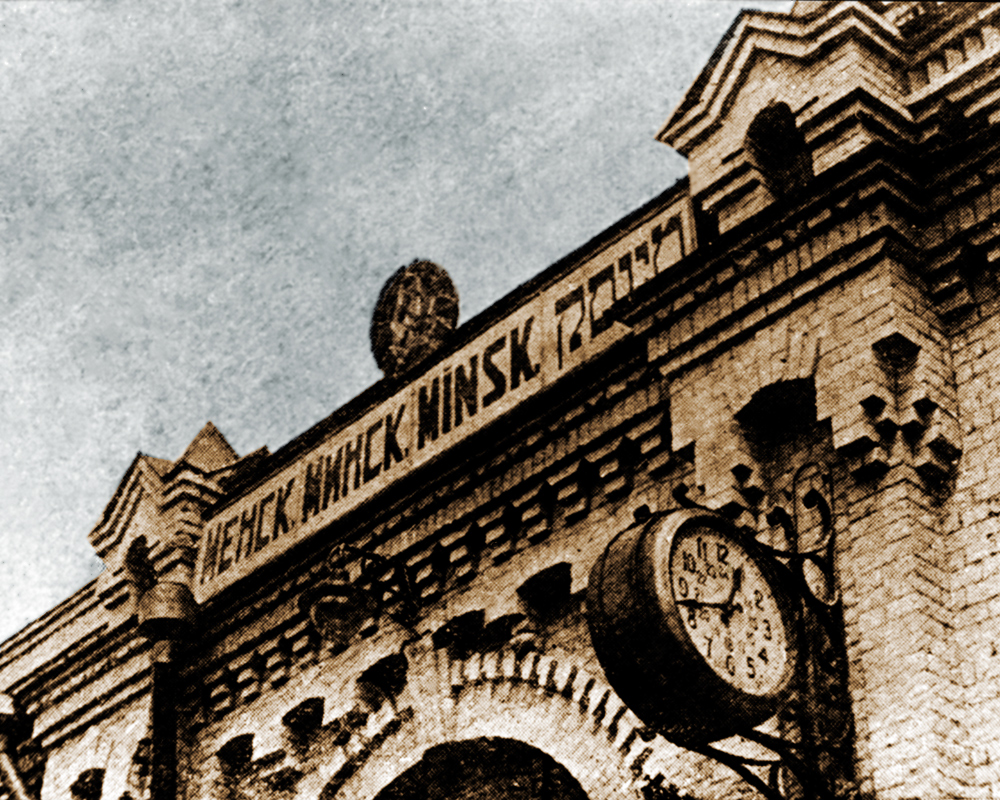
Minsk railway station in 1926. Four languages: Belarusian, Russian, Polish, and Yiddish.

In the early 20th century, especially after the Socialist October Revolution in Russia, Yiddish was emerging as a major Eastern European language. Its rich literature was more widely published than ever, Yiddish theatre and Yiddish cinema were booming, and for a time it achieved the status of one of the official languages of the short-lived Galician Soviet Socialist Republic. Educational autonomy for Jews in several countries (notably Poland) after World War I led to an increase in formal Yiddish-language education, more uniform orthography, and to the 1925 founding of the Yiddish Scientific Institute, YIVO. In Vilnius, there was debate over which language should take primacy, Hebrew or Yiddish.

Yiddish changed significantly during the 20th century. Michael Wex writes, "As increasing numbers of Yiddish speakers moved from the Slavic-speaking East to Western Europe and the Americas in the late 19th and early 20th centuries, they were so quick to jettison Slavic vocabulary that the most prominent Yiddish writers of the time—the founders of modern Yiddish literature, who were still living in Slavic-speaking countries—revised the printed editions of their oeuvres to eliminate obsolete and 'unnecessary' Slavisms." The vocabulary used in Israel absorbed many Modern Hebrew words, and there was a similar but smaller increase in the English component of Yiddish in the United States and, to a lesser extent, the United Kingdom. This has resulted in some difficulty in communication between Yiddish speakers from Israel and those from other countries.

"Khurbn Yiddish", as discussed by Professor Hannah Pollin-Galay, refers to the sociolect shaped by Yiddish speakers' experience during the Holocaust. Prisoners developed new words and slang, particularly relating to theft, protest, and sexuality.

== Phonology ==
There is significant phonological variation among the various Yiddish dialects. The description that follows is of a modern Standard Yiddish that was devised during the early 20th century and is frequently encountered in pedagogical contexts.

=== Consonants ===
Yiddish consonants
		Labial	Dental	Alveolar		Postalveolar		Palatal	Velar/ Uvular	Glottal
		Labial	Dental	hard	soft	hard	soft	Palatal	Velar/ Uvular	Glottal
Nasal		m		n	(nʲ)				(ŋ)	
Plosive Affricate	voiceless	p	t	ts	(tsʲ)	tʃ	(tʃʲ)		k	(ʔ)
Plosive Affricate	voiced	b	d	dz	(dzʲ)	dʒ	(dʒʲ)		ɡ	
Fricative	voiceless	f		s	(sʲ)	ʃ			χ	h
Fricative	voiced	v		z	(zʲ)	(ʒ)			ʁ	
Rhotic				r						
Approximant	median							j		
Approximant	lateral			l				(ʎ)		

- /m, p, b/ are bilabial, whereas /f, v/ are labiodental.
- The /l – ʎ/ contrast has collapsed in some speakers.
- The palatalized coronals /nʲ, tsʲ, dzʲ, tʃʲ, dʒʲ, sʲ, zʲ/ appear primarily in Slavic loanwords. The phonemic status of these palatalised consonants, as well as any other affricates, is unclear.
- /k, ɡ/ and [ŋ] are velar, whereas /j, ʎ/ are palatal.
  - [ŋ] is an allophone of /n/ after /k, ɡ/, and it can only be syllabic [ŋ̍].
  - [ɣ] is an allophone of /χ/ before /b, d, ɡ, v, z, ʒ/.
- The phonetic realization of /χ/ and /nʲ/ is unclear:
  - In the case of /χ/, Kleine (2003) puts it in the "velar" column, but consistently uses a symbol denoting a voiceless uvular fricative ⟨χ⟩ to transcribe it.
  - In the case of /nʲ/, Kleine (2003) puts it in the "palatalized" column. This can mean that it is either palatalized alveolar [nʲ] or alveolo-palatal [ɲ̟]. /ʎ/ may actually also be alveolo-palatal [ʎ̟], rather than just palatal.
- The rhotic /r/ can be either alveolar or uvular, either a trill [r ~ ʀ] or, more commonly, a flap/tap [ɾ ~ ʀ̆].
- The glottal stop [ʔ] appears only as an intervocalic separator.

As in the Slavic languages with which Yiddish was long in contact (Russian, Belarusian, Polish, and Ukrainian), but unlike German, voiceless stops have little to no aspiration; unlike many such languages, voiced stops are not devoiced in final position. Moreover, Yiddish has regressive voicing assimilation, so that, for example, זאָגט /zɔɡt/ ('says') is pronounced [zɔkt] and הקדמה /hakˈdɔmɜ/ ('foreword') is pronounced [haɡˈdɔmɜ].

=== Vowels ===
The vowel phonemes of Standard Yiddish are:

Yiddish monophthongs
	Front	Central	Back
Close	ɪ		ʊ
Open-mid	ɛ	ɜ	ɔ
Open	a		

- /ɪ, ʊ/ are typically near-close [ɪ, ʊ] respectively, but the height of /ɪ/ may vary freely between a higher and lower allophone.
- /ɜ/ appears only in unstressed syllables.

Diphthongs
Front nucleus	Central nucleus	Back nucleus
ɛɪ	aɪ	ɔɪ

- The last two diphthongs may be realized as [aɛ] and [ɔɜ], respectively.

In addition, the sonorants /l/ and /n/ can function as syllable nuclei:

- אײזל /ˈɛɪzl̩/ 'donkey'
- אָװנט /ˈɔvn̩t/ 'evening'

[m] and [ŋ] appear as syllable nuclei as well, but only as allophones of /n/, after bilabial consonants and dorsal consonants, respectively.

The syllabic sonorants are always unstressed.

=== Dialectal variation ===
Stressed vowels in the Yiddish dialects may be understood by considering their common origins in the Proto-Yiddish sound system. Yiddish linguistic scholarship uses a system developed by Max Weinreich in 1960 to indicate the descendent diaphonemes of the Proto-Yiddish stressed vowels.

Each Proto-Yiddish vowel is given a unique two-digit identifier, and its reflexes use it as a subscript, for example, Southeastern o_{11} is the vowel /o/, descended from Proto-Yiddish */a/. The first digit indicates Proto-Yiddish quality (1-=*[a], 2-=*[e], 3-=*[i], 4-=*[o], 5-=*[u]), and the second refers to quantity or diphthongization (−1=short, −2=long, −3=short but lengthened early in the history of Yiddish, −4=diphthong, −5=special length occurring only in Proto-Yiddish vowel 25).

Vowels 23, 33, 43 and 53 have the same reflexes as 22, 32, 42 and 52 in all Yiddish dialects, but they developed distinct values in Middle High German; Katz (1987) argues that they should be collapsed with the −2 series, leaving only 13 in the −3 series.

Genetic sources of Yiddish dialect vowels

Netherlandic
	Front	Back
Close	i_{31} iː_{32}	u_{52}
Close-mid	eː_{25}	o_{51} oː_{12}
Open-mid	ɛ_{21} ɛj_{22/34}	ɔ_{41} ɔu_{42/54}
Open	a_{11/13} aː_{24/44}	

Polish
	Front	Back
Close	i_{31/51} iː_{32/52}	u_{12/13}
Close-mid	eː~ej_{25}	oː~ou_{54}
Open-mid	ɛ_{21}	ɔ_{41} ɔj_{42/44}
Open	a_{11} aː_{34} aj_{22/24}	

Lithuanian
	Front	Back
Close	i_{31/32}	u_{51/52}
Close-mid	ej_{22/24/42/44}	
Open-mid	ɛ_{21/25}	ɔ_{12/13/41} ɔj_{54}
Open	a_{11} aj_{34}	

=== Comparison with German ===
In the vocabulary of Germanic origin, the differences between Standard German and Yiddish pronunciation are mainly in the vowels and diphthongs. All varieties of Yiddish lack the German front rounded vowels /œ, øː/ and /ʏ, yː/, having merged them with /ɛ, e:/ and /ɪ, i:/, respectively. In many respects, particularly with vowels and vowel diphthongs, and even how it forms diminutives, Yiddish is closer to Swabian German than to standard High German.

Diphthongs have also undergone divergent developments in German and Yiddish. Where Standard German has merged the Middle High German diphthong ei and long vowel î to /aɪ/, Yiddish has maintained the distinction between them; and likewise, the Standard German /ɔʏ/ corresponds to both the MHG diphthong öu and the long vowel iu, which in Yiddish have merged with their unrounded counterparts ei and î, respectively. Lastly, the Standard German /aʊ/ corresponds to both the MHG diphthong ou and the long vowel û, but in Yiddish, they have not merged. Although Standard Yiddish does not distinguish between those two diphthongs and renders both as /ɔɪ/, the distinction becomes apparent when the two diphthongs undergo Germanic umlaut, such as in forming plurals:

Singular				Plural	
English	MHG	Standard German	Standard Yiddish	Standard German	Standard Yiddish
tree	boum	Baum /baʊ̯m/	בױם /bɔɪm/	Bäume /ˈbɔʏ̯mə/	בײמער /bɛɪmɜr/
abdomen	bûch	Bauch /baʊ̯x/	בױך /bɔɪχ/	Bäuche /ˈbɔʏ̯çə/	בײַכער /baɪχɜr/

The vowel length distinctions of German do not exist in the Northeastern (Lithuanian) varieties of Yiddish, which form the phonetic basis for Standard Yiddish. In those varieties, the vowel qualities in most long/short vowel pairs diverged, and so the phonemic distinction has remained.

There are consonantal differences between German and Yiddish. Yiddish deaffricates the Middle High German voiceless labiodental affricate /pf/ to /f/ initially (as in פֿונט funt, but this pronunciation is also quasi-standard throughout northern and central Germany); /pf/ surfaces as an unshifted /p/ medially or finally (as in עפּל /ɛpl/ and קאָפּ /kɔp/). Additionally, final voiced stops appear in Standard Yiddish but not in Northern Standard German.

M. Weinreich's diaphoneme	Pronunciation						Examples		
M. Weinreich's diaphoneme	Middle High German	Standard German	Western Yiddish	Northeastern ("Litvish")	Central ("Poylish")	South-Eastern ("Ukrainish")	MHG	Standard German	Standard Yiddish
A_{1}	a in closed syllable	short a /a/	/a/	/a/	/a/	/ɔ/	machen, glat	machen, glatt /ˈmaxən, ɡlat/	מאַכן, גלאַט /maχn, ɡlat/
A_{2}	â	long a /aː/	/oː/	/ɔ/	/uː/	/u/	sâme	Samen /ˈzaːmən/	זױמען /ˈzɔɪ̯mn̩/
A_{3}	a in open syllable	long a /aː/	/aː/	/ɔ/	/uː/	/u/	vater, sagen	Vater, sagen /ˈfaːtɐ, zaːɡən/	פֿאָטער, זאָגן /ˈfɔtɜr, zɔɡn/
E_{1}	e, ä, æ, all in closed syllable	short ä and short e /ɛ/	/ɛ/	/ɛ/	/ɛ/	/ɛ/	becker, mensch	Bäcker, Mensch /ˈbɛkɐ, mɛnʃ/	בעקער, מענטש /ˈbɛkɜr, mɛntʃ/
E_{1}	ö in closed syllable	short ö /œ/	/ɛ/	/ɛ/	/ɛ/	/ɛ/	töhter	Töchter /ˈtœçtɐ/	טעכטער /ˈtɛχtɜr/
E_{5}	ä and æ in open syllable	long ä /ɛː/	/eː/	/ɛ/	/eː~eɪ/	/eɪ~ɪ/	kæse	Käse /ˈkɛːzə/	קעז /kɛz/
E_{2/3}	e in open syllable, and ê	long e /eː/	/ɛɪ/	/eɪ/	/aɪ/	/eɪ/	esel	Esel /eːzl̩/	אײזל /ɛɪzl/
E_{2/3}	ö in open syllable, and œ	long ö /øː/	/ɛɪ/	/eɪ/	/aɪ/	/eɪ/	schœne	schön /ʃøːn/	שײן /ʃɛɪn/
I_{1}	i in closed syllable	short i /ɪ/	/ɪ/	/ɪ/	/ɪ/	/ɪ/	niht	nicht /nɪçt/	נישט /nɪʃt/
I_{1}	ü in closed syllable	short ü /ʏ/	/ɪ/	/ɪ/	/ɪ/	/ɪ/	brück, vünf	Brücke, fünf /ˈbʁʏkə, fʏnf/	בריק, פֿינף /brɪk, fɪnf/
I_{2/3}	i in open syllable, and ie	long i /iː/	/iː/	/ɪ/	/iː/	/iː/	liebe	Liebe /ˈliːbə/	ליבע /ˈlɪbɜ/
I_{2/3}	ü in open syllable, and üe	long ü /yː/	/iː/	/ɪ/	/iː/	/iː/	grüene	grün /ɡʁyːn/	גרין /ɡrɪn/
O_{1}	o in closed syllable	short o /ɔ/	/ɔ/	/ɔ/	/ɔ/	/ɔ/	kopf, scholn	Kopf, sollen /kɔpf, ˈzɔlən/	קאָפּ, זאָלן /kɔp, zɔln/
O_{2/3}	o in open syllable, and ô	long o /oː/	/ɔu/	/eɪ~u~ui/	/ɔɪ/	/ɔɪ/	hôch, schône	hoch, schon /hoːx, ʃoːn/	הױך, שױן /hɔɪχ, ʃɔɪn/
U_{1}	u in closed syllable	short u /ʊ/	/ʊ/	/ʊ/	/ɪ/	/ɪ/	hunt	Hund /hʊnt/	הונט /hʊnt/
U_{2/3}	u in open syllable, and uo	long u /uː/	/uː/	/ʊ/	/iː/	/iː/	buoch	Buch /buːx/	בוך /bʊχ/
E_{4}	ei	ei /aɪ/	/aː/	/eɪ/	/aɪ/	/eɪ/	vleisch	Fleisch /flaɪ̯ʃ/	פֿלײש /flɛɪʃ/
I_{4}	î	ei /aɪ/	/aɪ/	/aɪ/	/aː/	/a/	mîn	mein /maɪ̯n/	מײַן /maɪn/
O_{4}	ou	au /aʊ/	/aː/	/eɪ/	/ɔɪ/	/ɔɪ/	ouh, koufen	auch, kaufen /aʊ̯x, ˈkaʊ̯fən/	אױך, קױפֿן /ɔɪχ, kɔɪfn/
U_{4}	û	au /aʊ/	/ɔu/	/ɔɪ/	/oː~ou/	/ou~u/	hûs	Haus/haʊ̯s/	הױז /hɔɪz/
(E_{4})	öu	äu and eu /ɔʏ/	/aː/	/eɪ/	/aɪ/	/eɪ/	vröude	Freude /ˈfʁɔʏ̯də/	פֿרײד /frɛɪd/
(I_{4})	iu	äu and eu /ɔʏ/	/aɪ/	/aɪ/	/aː/	/a/	diutsch	Deutsch /dɔʏ̯t͡ʃ/	דײַטש /daɪtʃ/

=== Comparison with Hebrew ===
The pronunciation of vowels in Yiddish words of Hebrew origin is similar to Ashkenazi Hebrew but not identical. The most prominent difference is kamatz gadol in closed syllables being pronounced the same as patah in Yiddish but the same as any other kamatz in Ashkenazi Hebrew. Also, Hebrew features no reduction of unstressed vowels, and so the given name Jochebed יוֹכֶבֶֿד would be /jɔɪˈχɛvɛd/ in Ashkenazi Hebrew but /ˈjɔχvɜd/ in Standard Yiddish.

M. Weinreich's diaphoneme	Tiberian vocalization	Pronunciation			Examples
M. Weinreich's diaphoneme	Tiberian vocalization	Western Yiddish	Northeastern ("Litvish")	Central ("Poylish")	Standard Yiddish
A_{1}	patah and kamatz gadol in closed syllable	/a/	/a/	/a/	אַלְמָן, כְּתָבֿ /ˈalmɜn, ksav/
A_{2}	kamatz gadol in open syllable	/oː/	/ɔ/	/uː/	פָּנִים /ˈpɔnɜm/
E_{1}	tzere and segol in closed syllable; hataf segol	/ɛ/	/ɛ/	/ɛ/	גֵּט, חֶבְֿרָה, אֱמֶת /gɛt, ˈχɛvrɜ, ˈɛmɜs/
E_{5}	segol in open syllable	/eː/	/ɛ/	/eː~eɪ/	גֶּפֶֿן /ˈgɛfɜn/
E_{2/3}	tzere in open syllable	/ɛɪ/	/eɪ/	/aɪ/	סֵדֶר /ˈsɛɪdɜr/
I_{1}	hiriq in closed syllable	/ɪ/	/ɪ/	/ɪ/	דִּבּוּק /ˈdɪbɜk/
I_{2/3}	hiriq in open syllable	/iː/	/ɪ/	/iː/	מְדִינָה /mɜˈdɪnɜ/
O_{1}	holam and kamatz katan in closed syllable	/ɔ/	/ɔ/	/ɔ/	חָכְמָה, עוֹף /ˈχɔχmɜ, ɔf/
O_{2/3}	holam in open syllable	/ɔu/	/eɪ/	/ɔɪ/	סוֹחֵר /ˈsɔɪχɜr/
U_{1}	kubutz and shuruk in closed syllable	/ʊ/	/ʊ/	/ɪ/	מוּם /mʊm/
U_{2/3}	kubutz and shuruk in open syllable	/uː/	/ʊ/	/iː/	שׁוּרָה /ˈʃʊrɜ/

Patah in open syllable, as well as hataf patah, are unpredictably split between A_{1} and A_{2}: קַדַּחַת, נַחַת /kaˈdɔχɜs, ˈnaχɜs/; חֲלוֹם, חֲתֻנָּה /ˈχɔlɜm, ˈχasɜnɜ/. A shva typically reduces to zero, or becomes an "e" vowel (E_{1}); some exceptions exist, however.

== Grammar ==
Yiddish grammar can vary slightly depending on the dialect. The main article focuses on standard form of Yiddish grammar while also acknowledging some dialectal differences. Yiddish grammar has similarities to the German grammar system, as well as grammatical elements from Hebrew and Slavic languages.

== Writing system ==
Yiddish is written in the Hebrew alphabet, but its orthography differs significantly from that of Hebrew. In Hebrew, many vowels are represented only optionally by diacritical marks called niqqud whereas Yiddish uses letters to represent all vowels. Several Yiddish letters consist of another letter combined with a niqqud mark resembling a Hebrew letter–niqqud pair, but each of those combinations is an inseparable unit representing a vowel alone, not a consonant–vowel sequence. The niqqud marks have no phonetic value on their own.

In most varieties of Yiddish, however, words borrowed from Hebrew are written in their native forms without application of Yiddish orthographical conventions.

== Numbers of speakers ==
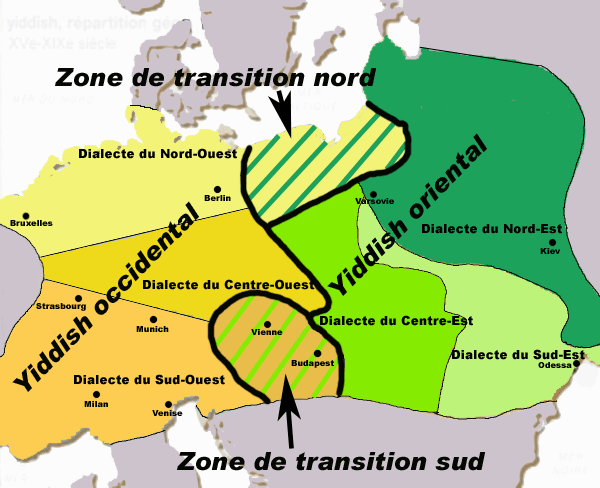
Map of the Yiddish dialects between the 15th and the 19th centuries (Western dialects in orange / Eastern dialects in green)

Ghosts love Yiddish and as far as I know, they all speak it.

— Isaac Bashevis Singer upon receiving the Nobel Prize for Literature, 1978

On the eve of World War II, there were 11 to 13 million Yiddish speakers. The Holocaust, however, led to a dramatic, sudden decline in the use of Yiddish, as the eastern and central-European Jewish communities, both secular and religious, that extensively used Yiddish in their day-to-day life were largely destroyed. Around five million of those killed – 85 percent of the Jews murdered in the Holocaust – were speakers of Yiddish. Although millions of Yiddish speakers survived the war (including nearly all Yiddish speakers in the Americas), further assimilation in countries such as the United States and the Soviet Union, in addition to the strictly monolingual stance of the Haskalah and later Zionist movements, led to a decline in the use of Eastern Yiddish. However, the number of speakers within the widely dispersed Haredi (mainly Hasidic) communities is now increasing. Although used in various countries, Yiddish has attained official recognition as a minority language only in the Jewish Autonomous Oblast of Russia, Moldova, Bosnia and Herzegovina, the Netherlands, and Sweden.

Reports of the number of current Yiddish speakers vary significantly. Ethnologue estimates, based on publications through 1991, that there were at that time 1.5 million speakers of Eastern Yiddish, of which 40% lived in Ukraine, 15% in Israel, and 10% in the United States. The Modern Language Association agrees with fewer than 200,000 in the United States. Western Yiddish is reported by Ethnologue to have had an ethnic population of 50,000 in 2000, and an undated speaking population of 5,400, mostly in Germany. A 1996 report by the Council of Europe estimates a worldwide Yiddish-speaking population of about two million. Further demographic information about the recent status of what is treated as an Eastern–Western dialect continuum is provided in the YIVO Language and Cultural Atlas of Ashkenazic Jewry.

In a study in the first half of 2024, the German media association Internationale Medienhilfe (IMH) found that the number of Yiddish media is increasing again, due to an increase in the Yiddish-speaking population, especially in the USA. According to IMH estimates, the number of speakers worldwide is approaching two million. In 2024, more than 40 print media were published worldwide in Yiddish - and the trend is rising.

The 1922 census of Palestine lists 1,946 Yiddish speakers in Mandatory Palestine (9 in the Southern District, 1,401 in Jerusalem-Jaffa, 4 in Samaria, and 532 in the Northern District), including 1,759 in municipal areas (999 in Jerusalem, 356 in Jaffa, 332 in Haifa, 5 in Gaza, 4 in Hebron, 3 in Nazareth, 7 in Ramleh, 33 in Tiberias, and 4 in Jenin).

In the Hasidic communities of Israel, boys speak more Yiddish amongst themselves, while girls use Hebrew more often. This is probably due to the tendency of girls to learn more secular subjects, thus increasing their contact with the Hebrew language, while boys are usually taught religious subjects in Yiddish.

== Status as a language ==
Historically, there have been frequent debates about the extent of the linguistic independence of Yiddish from the languages that it absorbed. There has been periodic assertion that Yiddish is a dialect of German, or even "just broken German, more of a linguistic mishmash than a true language". Even when recognized as an autonomous language, it has occasionally been referred to, typically by people foreign to the language, as Judeo-German, along the lines of other Jewish languages like Judeo-Persian, Judeo-Spanish or Judeo-French. A widely cited summary of attitudes in the 1930s was published by Max Weinreich, quoting a remark by an auditor of one of his lectures: אַ שפּראַך איז אַ דיאַלעקט מיט אַן אַרמיי און פֿלאָט (a shprakh iz a dialekt mit an armey un flot — "A language is a dialect with an army and navy").

Today's speakers consider Yiddish a separate language, officially recognized as such in the USSR (where it was viewed as "the Jewish language"), post-Soviet Russia and Sweden, thus complying to Max Weinreich's notion of official state recognition. Virtually all specialists working in the field of Yiddish view it as a separate language, including researchers and teachers who study and teach Yiddish in German-speaking countries. For centuries, Yiddish has been developing in countries separated from the German language space and has its own system of dialects. Contemporary debates on this subject are almost exclusively limited to the nature of medieval and early modern texts written in Western Yiddish dialects that seem much closer to varieties of German than today's Eastern Yiddish.

=== Israel and Zionism ===
We shall get rid of the stunted and squashed jargons which we use now, these ghetto languages. They were the furtive tongues of prisoners. (Note: Die verkümmerten und verdrückten Jargons, deren wir uns jetzt bedienen, diese Ghettosprachen werden wir uns abgewöhnen. Es waren die verstohlenen Sprachen von Gefangenen.)

— Theodor Herzl, Der Judenstaat, 1896.

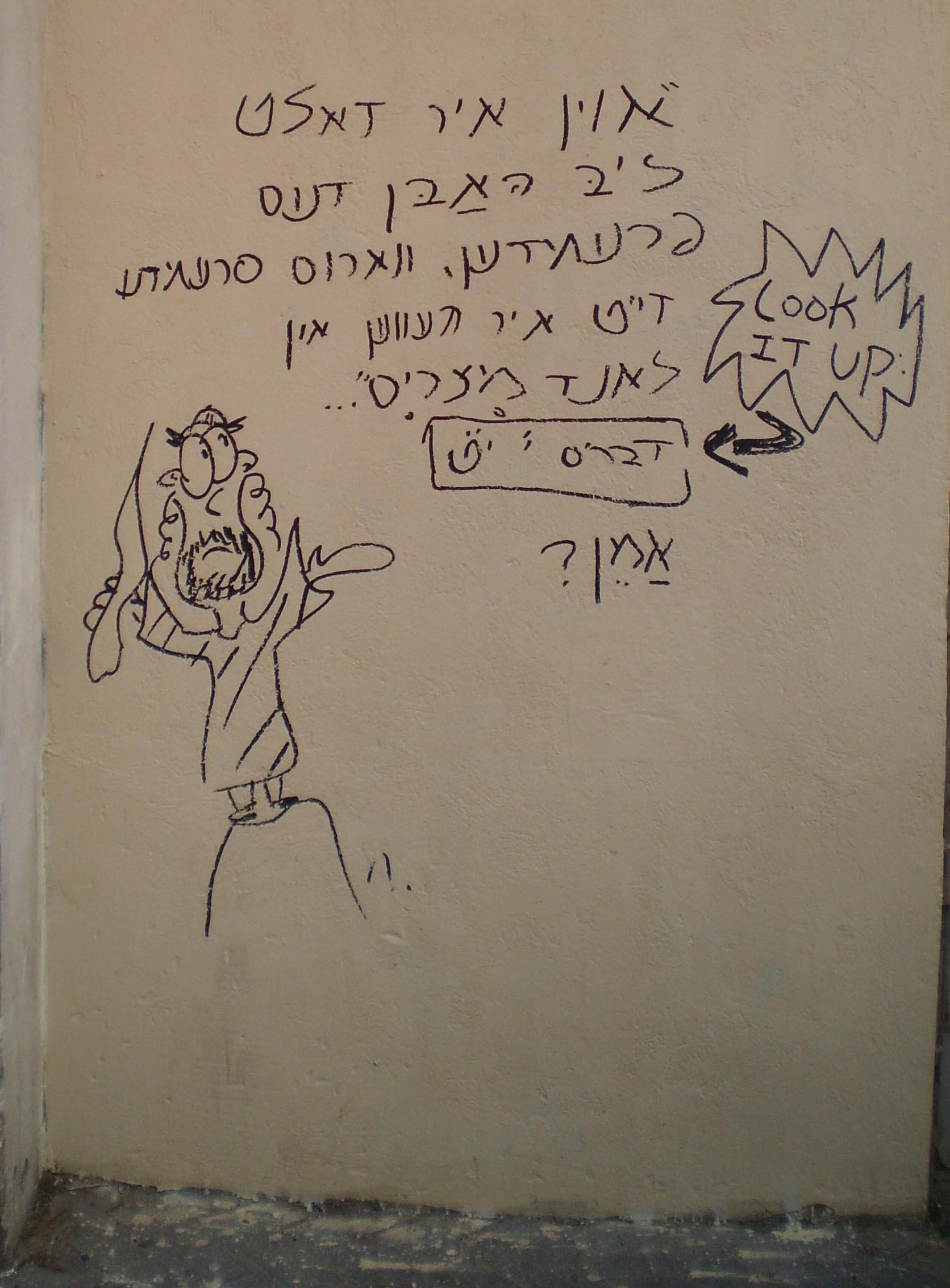
An example of graffiti in Yiddish, Tel Aviv, Washington Avenue (און איר זאלט ליב האבן דעם פרעמדען, ווארום פרעמדע זייט איר געווען אין לאנד מצרים—Un ir zolt lib hobn dem fremden, varum fremde zayt ir geven in land mitsraym). "You shall have love for the stranger, because you were strangers in the land of Egypt." (Deuteronomy 10:19)

The national language of Israel is Modern Hebrew. The debate in Zionist circles over the use of Yiddish in Israel and in the diaspora in preference to Hebrew also reflected the tensions between religious and secular Jewish lifestyles. Many secular Zionists wanted Hebrew as the sole language of Jews, to contribute to a national cohesive identity. Traditionally religious Jews, on the other hand, preferred use of Yiddish, viewing Hebrew as a respected holy language reserved for prayer and religious study. In the early 20th century, Zionist activists in the Mandate of Palestine tried to eradicate the use of Yiddish among Jews in preference to Hebrew, and make its use socially unacceptable.

This conflict also reflected the opposing views among secular Jews worldwide, one side seeing Hebrew (and Zionism) and the other Yiddish (and Internationalism) as the means of defining Jewish nationalism. In the 1920s and 1930s, גדוד מגיני השפה gdud maginéi hasafá, "Battalion for the Defence of the Language", whose motto was "עברי, דבר עברית ivri, dabér ivrít", that is, "Hebrew [i.e. Jew], speak Hebrew!", used to tear down signs written in "foreign" languages and disturb Yiddish theatre gatherings with stink bombs. In 1927, a proposal to institute a chair in Yiddish at Hebrew University was met with protests. However, according to linguist Ghil'ad Zuckermann, the members of this group in particular, and the Hebrew revival in general, did not succeed in uprooting Yiddish patterns (as well as the patterns of other European languages Jewish immigrants spoke) within what he calls "Israeli", i.e. Modern Hebrew. Zuckermann believes that "Israeli does include numerous Hebrew elements resulting from a conscious revival but also numerous pervasive linguistic features deriving from a subconscious survival of the revivalists’ mother tongues, e.g. Yiddish."

After the founding of the State of Israel, a massive wave of Jewish immigrants from Arab countries arrived. In short order, these Mizrahi Jews and their descendants would account for nearly half the Jewish population. While all were at least familiar with Hebrew as a liturgical language, essentially none had any contact with or affinity for Yiddish (some, of Sephardic origin, spoke Judeo-Spanish, others various Judeo-Arabic varieties). Thus, Hebrew emerged as the dominant linguistic common denominator between the different population groups.

According to Itay Zutra, a teacher of Yiddish at the University of Manitoba, Yiddish was portrayed as a feminine and emasculate language in Israel, sometimes even associated with being a homosexual. One such example of this is in the 1970 movie Shablul, where a frail Yiddish speaker, told he needs to be a strong Jewish man, goes to a karate instructor for help. The instructor, also a Yiddish speaker, agrees to teach him. The instructor then tries to grope and have sex with the man during a private session. It has also been argued by Yiddish writer and literary critic Shmuel Niger and professor Naomi Seidman that even before Zionism, Yiddish was seen as having an inherent level of femininity, while Hebrew was the opposite and was inherently masculine. Much of this stems from the fact that women were excluded from having formal training in Hebrew, which made Yiddish the only Jewish language women could speak, read and write in. As a consequence, Yiddish texts and the language as a whole inherently took on feminine traits, even when written and spoken by men.

Despite a past of marginalization and anti-Yiddish government policy, in 1996 the Knesset passed a law founding the "National Authority for Yiddish Culture", with the aim of supporting and promoting contemporary Yiddish art and literature, as well as preservation of Yiddish culture and publication of Yiddish classics, both in Yiddish and in Hebrew translation.

In religious circles, it is Ashkenazi Haredi Jews, particularly Hasidic Jews and the Lithuanian yeshiva world, who continue to teach, speak and use Yiddish (which, in Israel, has evolved into the Haredi dialect), making it a language used regularly by hundreds of thousands of Haredi Jews today. The largest of these centers are in Bnei Brak and Jerusalem.

There is a growing revival of interest in Yiddish culture among secular Israelis, with the flourishing of new proactive cultural organizations like YUNG YiDiSH, as well as Yiddish theatre (usually with simultaneous translation to Hebrew and Russian) and young people are taking university courses in Yiddish, some achieving considerable fluency.

=== South Africa ===
In the early years of the 20th century, Yiddish was classified as a 'Semitic Language'. After much campaigning, in 1906, the South African legislator Morris Alexander won a parliamentary fight to have Yiddish reclassified as a European language, thereby permitting the immigration of Yiddish speakers to South Africa. While there used to be a large Yiddish press in South Africa now Yiddish has largely died out in South Africa being replaced with other languages.

=== Mexico ===
In Mexico, Yiddish was spoken among the Ashkenazi Jewish population and Yiddish poet Isaac Berliner wrote about the life of Mexican Jews. Isaac Berliner's Yiddishism was a way for the Ashkenazi Jews in Mexico to build a secular culture in a Mexico skeptical of religion. Yiddish became a marker of Ashkenazi ethnic identity in Mexico.

=== Former Soviet Union ===
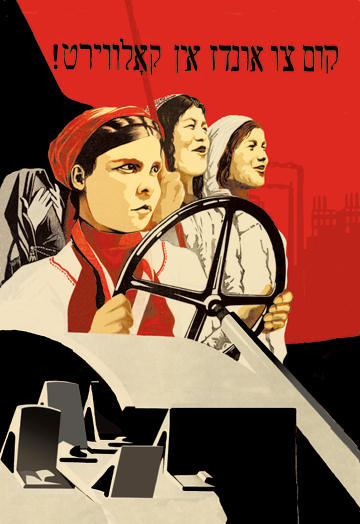
NEP-era Soviet Yiddish poster "Come to us at the Kolkhoz!" (קום צו אונדז אין קאָלווירט!)

In the Soviet Union during the era of the New Economic Policy (NEP) in the 1920s, Yiddish was promoted as the language of the Jewish proletariat. At the same time, Hebrew was considered a bourgeois and reactionary language and its use was generally discouraged. Yiddish was one of the recognized languages of the Byelorussian Soviet Socialist Republic. Until 1938, the Emblem of the Byelorussian Soviet Socialist Republic included the motto Workers of the world, unite! in Yiddish. Yiddish was also an official language in several agricultural districts of the Galician Soviet Socialist Republic.

The use of Yiddish as the primary spoken language by Jews was heavily encouraged by multiple Jewish political groups at the time. The Evsektsii, the Jewish Communist Group, and The Bund, the Jewish Socialist Group, both heavily encouraged the use of Yiddish. During the Bolshevik Era these political groups worked alongside the government to encourage the widespread Jewish use of Yiddish. Both the Evsektsii and the Bund supported the Jewish movement towards assimilation and saw Yiddish as a way to encourage it. They saw the use of Yiddish as a step away from the religious aspects of Judaism, instead favoring the cultural aspects of Judaism.

State emblem of the Byelorussian SSR (1927–1937) with the motto Workers of the world, unite! in Yiddish (lower left part of the ribbon): ״פראָלעטאריער פון אלע לענדער, פאראייניקט זיך!״—Proletarier fun ale lender, fareynikt zikh! The same slogan is written in Belarusian, Russian and Polish.

A public educational system entirely based on the Yiddish language was established and comprised kindergartens, schools, and higher educational institutions (technical schools, rabfaks and other university departments). These were initially created in the Russian Empire to stop Jewish children from taking too many spots in regular Russian schools. Imperial government feared that the Jewish children were both taking spots from non-Jews as well as spreading revolutionary ideas to their non-Jewish peers. As a result, in 1914 laws were passed that guaranteed Jews the right to a Jewish education and as a result the Yiddish education system was established. After the Bolshevik revolution in 1917 even more Yiddish schools were established. These schools thrived with government, specifically Bolshevik, and Jewish support. They were established as part of the effort to revitalize the Soviet Jewish Community. Specifically, the Bolsheviks wanted to encourage Jewish assimilation. While these schools were taught in Yiddish, the content was Soviet. They were created to attract Jews in to getting a Soviet education under the guise of a Jewish institution.

While schools with curriculums taught in Yiddish existed in some areas until the 1950s, there was a general decline in enrollment due to preference for Russian-speaking institutions and the declining reputation of Yiddish schools among Yiddish speaking Soviets. As the Yiddish schools declined, so did overall Yiddish culture. The two were inherently linked and with the downfall of one, so did the other. General Soviet denationalization programs and secularization policies also led to a further lack of enrollment and funding; the last schools to be closed existed until 1951. It continued to be spoken widely for decades, nonetheless, in areas with compact Jewish populations (primarily in Moldova, Ukraine, and to a lesser extent Belarus).

In the former Soviet states, recently active Yiddish authors include Yoysef Burg (Chernivtsi 1912–2009) and Olexander Beyderman (b. 1949, Odessa). Publication of an earlier Yiddish periodical (דער פֿרײַנד – der fraynd; lit. The Friend), was resumed in 2004 with דער נײַער פֿרײַנד (der nayer fraynd; lit. The New Friend, Saint Petersburg).

==== Russia ====
According to the 2010 census, 1,683 people spoke Yiddish in Russia, approximately 1% of all the Jews of the Russian Federation. According to Mikhail Shvydkoy, former Minister of Culture of Russia and himself of Jewish origin, Yiddish culture in Russia is gone, and its revival is unlikely.

From my point of view, Yiddish culture today isn't just fading away, but disappearing. It is stored as memories, as fragments of phrases, as books that have long gone unread. ... Yiddish culture is dying and this should be treated with utmost calm. There is no need to pity that which cannot be resurrected – it has receded into the world of the enchanting past, where it should remain. Any artificial culture, a culture without replenishment, is meaningless. ... Everything that happens with Yiddish culture is transformed into a kind of cabaret—epistolary genre, nice, cute to the ear and the eye, but having nothing to do with high art, because there is no natural, national soil. In Russia, it is the memory of the departed, sometimes sweet memories. But it's the memories of what will never be again. Perhaps that's why these memories are always so sharp.

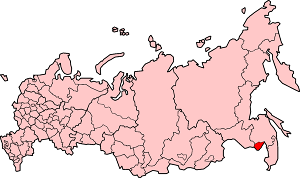
The Jewish Autonomous Oblast in Russia

The Jewish Autonomous Oblast was formed in 1934 in the Russian Far East, with its capital city in Birobidzhan and Yiddish as its official language. The intention was for the Soviet Jewish population to settle there. Jewish cultural life was revived in Birobidzhan much earlier than elsewhere in the Soviet Union. Yiddish theaters began opening in the 1970s. The newspaper ביראָבידזשאַנער שטערן (Birobidzhaner Shtern; lit: Birobidzhan Star) includes a Yiddish section. In modern Russia, the cultural significance of the language is still recognized and bolstered. The First Birobidzhan International Summer Program for Yiddish Language and Culture was launched in 2007.

As of 2010, according to data provided by the Russian Census Bureau, there were 97 speakers of Yiddish in the JAO. A November 2017 article in The Guardian, titled, "Revival of a Soviet Zion: Birobidzhan celebrates its Jewish heritage", examined the current status of the city and suggested that, even though the Jewish Autonomous Region in Russia's far east is now barely 1% Jewish, officials hope to woo back people who left after Soviet collapse and to revive the Yiddish language in this region. Despite the small number of local speakers, the weekly state-run newspaper Birobidzhaner Shtern contains 2–4 pages in Yiddish, largely written by authors who live in other cities and countries, and its online version attracts international readership. Yiddish often appears in the local TV program Yiddishkeit, also available online.

==== Ukraine ====
Yiddish was an official language of the Ukrainian People's Republic (1917–1921). But due to the holocaust, assimilation, and migration of Ukrainian Jews abroad today only 3,100 of the remaining Jews speak Yiddish as their first language. The Southeast dialect of Yiddish has many Ukrainian loanwords due to the long contact between Yiddish speakers and Ukrainian speakers.

=== Council of Europe ===
Several countries that ratified the 1992 European Charter for Regional or Minority Languages have included Yiddish in the list of their recognized minority languages: the Netherlands (1996), Sweden (2000), Romania (2008), Poland (2009), Bosnia and Herzegovina (2010). In 2005, Ukraine did not mention Yiddish as such, but "the language(s) of the Jewish ethnic minority".

=== Sweden ===
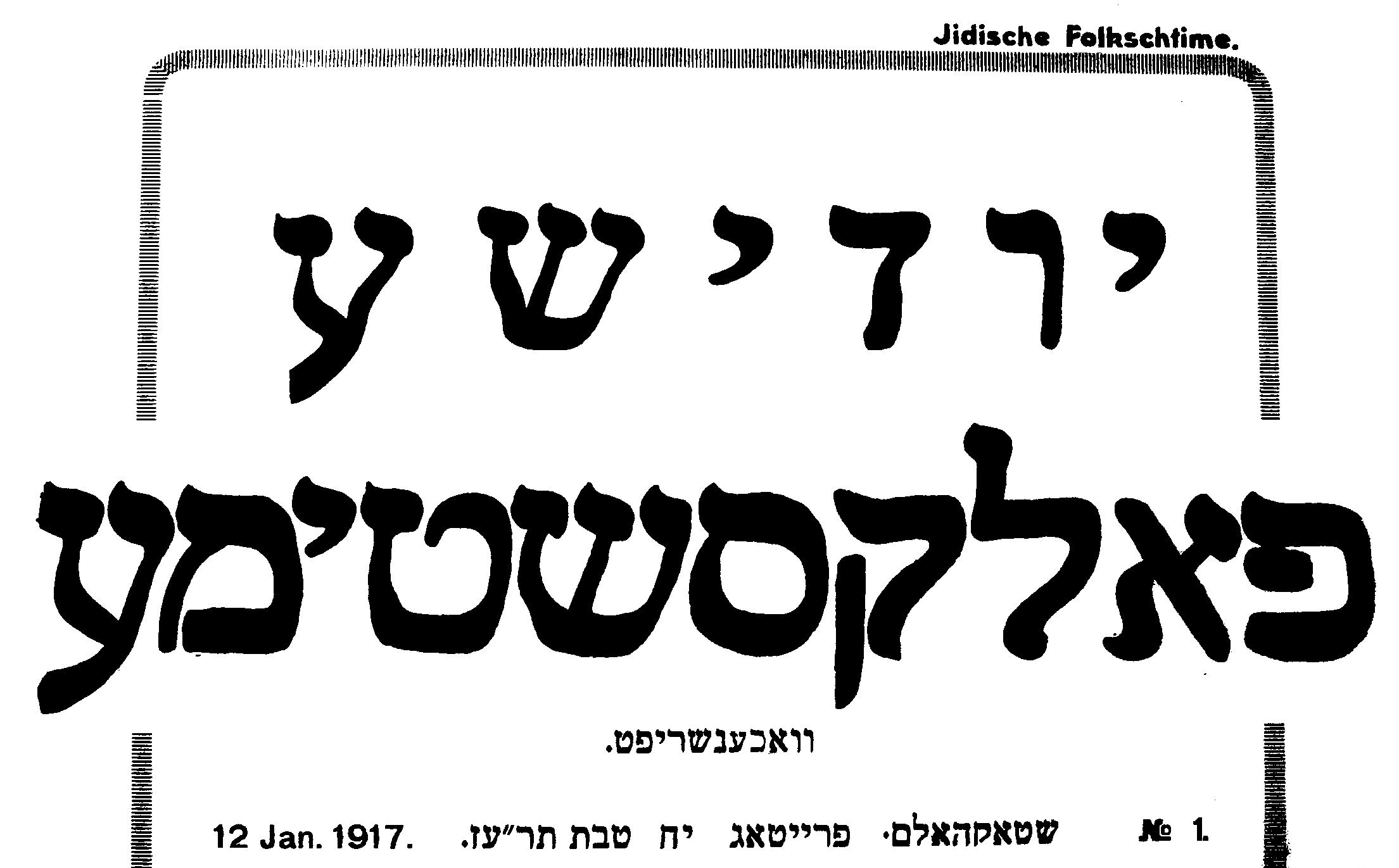
Banner from the first issue of the יודישע פאלקסשטימע—Jidische Folkschtime (Yiddish People's Voice), published in Stockholm, January 12, 1917

In June 1999, the Swedish Parliament enacted legislation giving Yiddish legal status as one of the country's official minority languages (entering into effect in April 2000).

Additional legislation was enacted in June 2006 establishing a new governmental agency, the Swedish National Language Council, whose goal is to "collect, preserve, scientifically research, and spread material about the national minority languages." These languages include Yiddish.

The Swedish government has published documents in Yiddish detailing the national action plan for human rights. An earlier one provides general information about national minority language policies. On September 6, 2007, it became possible to register Internet domains with Yiddish names in the national top-level domain .se.

The first Jews were permitted to reside in Sweden during the late 18th century. The Jewish population in Sweden is estimated at 20,000. According to various reports and surveys, between 2,000 and 6,000 Swedish Jews have at least some knowledge of Yiddish. In 2009, the number of native speakers was estimated by linguist Mikael Parkvall to be 750–1,500. He says that most native speakers of Yiddish in Sweden today are adults, many of them elderly.

After the war Yiddish theater enjoyed great popularity in Sweden and all the great stars performed there. Since the recognition of Yiddish as an official minority language, Swedish schoolchildren have the right to study Yiddish at school as a mother tongue, and there are public radio broadcasts and television shows in Yiddish.

=== United States ===
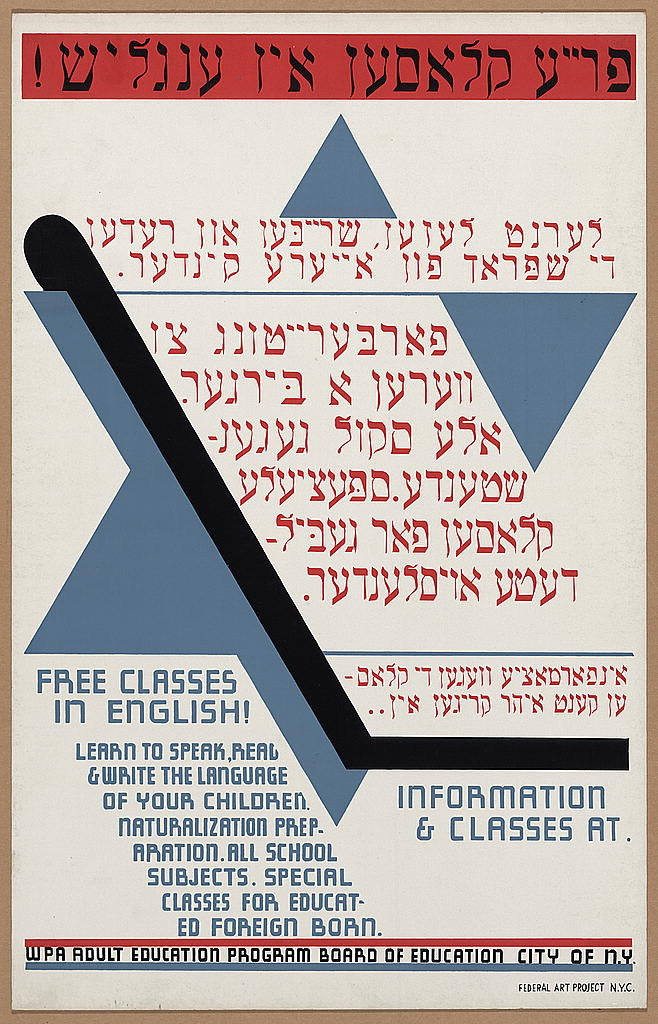
Poster by the City of New York advertising free English classes for Yiddish émigrés and proletarian speakers, 1930s: "Learn to speak, read and write the language of your children."

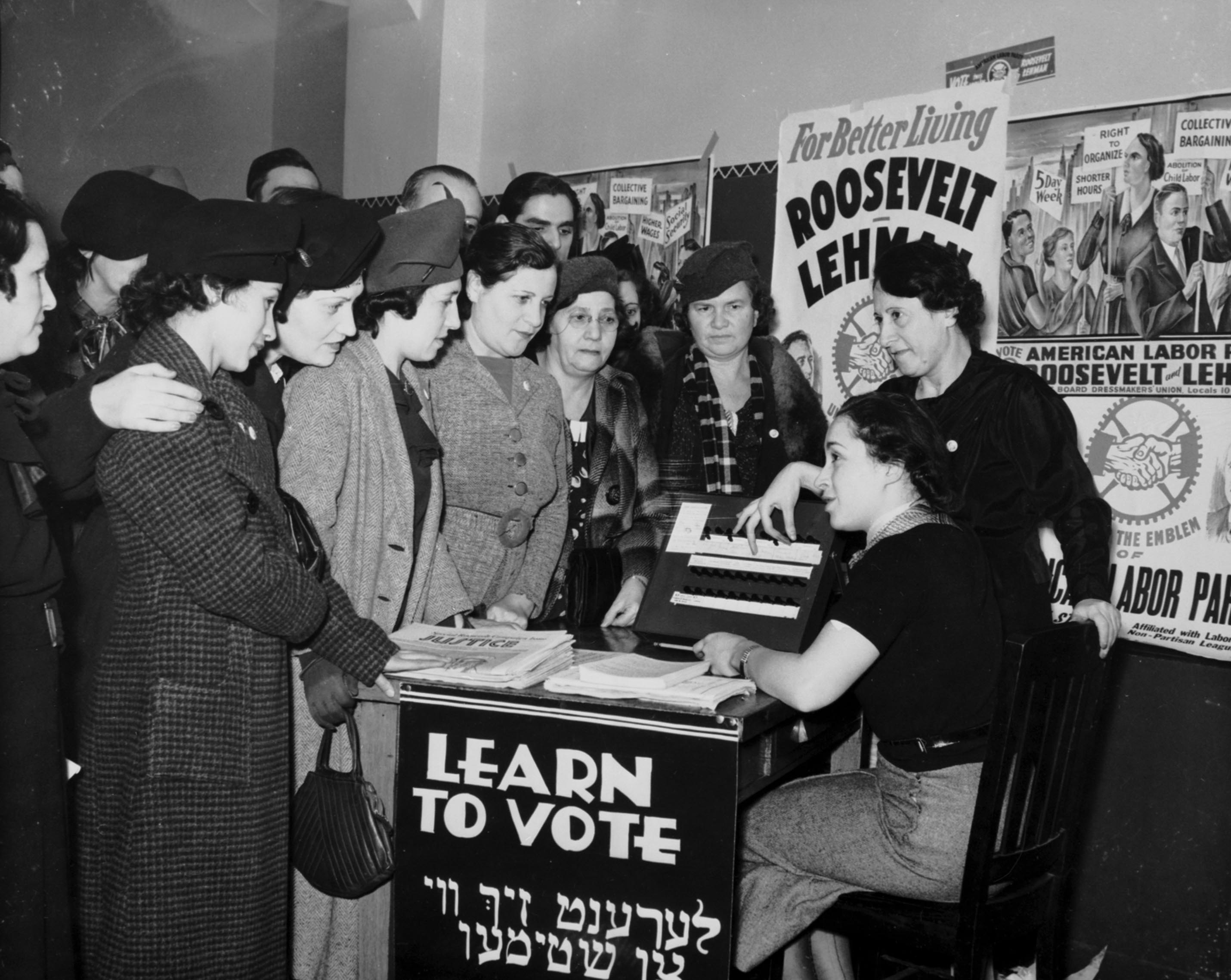
Women surrounded by posters in English and Yiddish supporting Democratic candidates Franklin D. Roosevelt, Herbert H. Lehman, and the American Labor Party teach other women how to vote, 1936.

Yiddish distribution in the United States. Most Yiddish speakers dwell in New York, Florida, New Jersey, California, and Pennsylvania. More than 100,000 speakers More than 10,000 speakers More than 5,000 speakers More than 1,000 speakers Fewer than 1,000 speakers

In the United States, at first most Jews were of Sephardic origin, and hence did not speak Yiddish. It was not until the mid-to-late 19th century, as first German Jews, then Central and Eastern European Jews, arrived in the nation, that Yiddish became dominant within the immigrant community. This helped to bond Jews from many countries. פֿאָרװערטס (Forverts – The Forward) was one of seven Yiddish daily newspapers in New York City, and other Yiddish newspapers served as a forum for Jews of all European backgrounds. In 1915, the circulation of the daily Yiddish newspapers was half a million in New York City alone, and 600,000 nationally. In addition, thousands more subscribed to the numerous weekly papers and the many magazines.

The typical circulation in the 21st century is a few thousand. The Forward still appears weekly and is also available in an online edition. It remains in wide distribution, together with דער אַלגעמיינער זשורנאַל (der algemeyner zhurnal – Algemeyner Journal; algemeyner = general), a Chabad newspaper which is also published weekly and appears online. The widest-circulation Yiddish newspapers are probably the weekly issues Der Yid (דער איד "The Jew"), Der Blatt (דער בלאַט; blat 'paper') and Di Tzeitung (די צײטונג 'the newspaper'). Several additional newspapers and magazines are in regular production, such as the weekly אידישער טריביון Yiddish Tribune and the monthly publications דער שטערן (Der Shtern The Star) and דער בליק (Der Blik The View). (The romanized titles cited in this paragraph are in the form given on the masthead of each publication and may be at some variance both with the literal Yiddish title and the transliteration rules otherwise applied in this article.) Thriving Yiddish theater, especially in the New York City Yiddish Theatre District, kept the language vital. Interest in klezmer music provided another bonding mechanism.

Most of the Jewish immigrants to the New York metropolitan area during the years of Ellis Island considered Yiddish their native language; however, native Yiddish speakers tended not to pass the language on to their children, who assimilated and spoke English. For example, Isaac Asimov states in his autobiography In Memory Yet Green that Yiddish was his first and sole spoken language, and remained so for about two years after he emigrated to the United States as a small child. By contrast, Asimov's younger siblings, born in the United States, never developed any degree of fluency in Yiddish.

Many "Yiddishisms", like "Italianisms" and "Spanishisms", entered New York City English, often used by Jews and non-Jews alike, unaware of the linguistic origin of the phrases. Yiddish words used in English were documented extensively by Leo Rosten in The Joys of Yiddish; see also the list of English words of Yiddish origin.

In 1975, the film Hester Street, much of which is in Yiddish, was released. It was later chosen to be on the Library of Congress National Film Registry for being considered a "culturally, historically, or aesthetically significant" film.

In 1976, the Canadian-born American author Saul Bellow received the Nobel Prize in Literature. He was fluent in Yiddish, and translated several Yiddish poems and stories into English, including Isaac Bashevis Singer's "Gimpel the Fool". In 1978, Singer, a writer in the Yiddish language, who was born in Poland and lived in the United States, received the Nobel Prize in Literature.

Legal scholars Eugene Volokh and Alex Kozinski argue that Yiddish is "supplanting Latin as the spice in American legal argot".

==== Present U.S. speaker population ====
In the 2000 United States census, 178,945 people in the United States reported speaking Yiddish at home. Of these speakers, 113,515 lived in New York (63.43% of American Yiddish speakers); 18,220 in Florida (10.18%); 9,145 in New Jersey (5.11%); and 8,950 in California (5.00%). The remaining states with speaker populations larger than 1,000 are Pennsylvania (5,445), Ohio (1,925), Michigan (1,945), Massachusetts (2,380), Maryland (2,125), Illinois (3,510), Connecticut (1,710), and Arizona (1,055). The population is largely elderly: 72,885 of the speakers were older than 65, 66,815 were between 18 and 64, and only 39,245 were age 17 or lower.

In the six years since the 2000 census, the 2006 American Community Survey reflected an estimated 15 percent decline of people speaking Yiddish at home in the U.S. to 152,515. In 2011, the number of persons in the United States above the age of five speaking Yiddish at home was 160,968. 88% of them were living in four metropolitan areas – New York City and another metropolitan area just north of it, Miami, and Los Angeles.

There are a few predominantly Hasidic communities in the United States in which Yiddish remains the majority language including concentrations in the Crown Heights, Borough Park, and Williamsburg neighborhoods of Brooklyn. In Kiryas Joel in Orange County, New York, in the 2000 census, nearly 90% of residents of Kiryas Joel reported speaking Yiddish at home.

=== United Kingdom ===
There are over 30,000 Yiddish speakers in the United Kingdom, and several thousand children now have Yiddish as a first language. The largest group of Yiddish speakers in Britain reside in the Stamford Hill district of North London, but there are sizable communities in northwest London, Leeds, Manchester and Gateshead. The Yiddish readership in the UK is mainly reliant upon imported material from the United States and Israel for newspapers, magazines and other periodicals. However, the London-based weekly Jewish Tribune has a small section in Yiddish called אידישע טריבונע Yidishe Tribune. From the 1910s to the 1950s, London had a daily Yiddish newspaper called די צײַט (Di Tsayt, Yiddish pronunciation: [dɪ tsaɪt]; in English, The Time), founded, and edited from offices in Whitechapel Road, by Romanian-born Morris Myer, who was succeeded on his death in 1943 by his son Harry. There were also from time to time Yiddish newspapers in Manchester, Liverpool, Glasgow and Leeds. The bilingual Yiddish and English café Pink Peacock opened in Glasgow in 2021 but closed down in 2023.

=== Canada ===
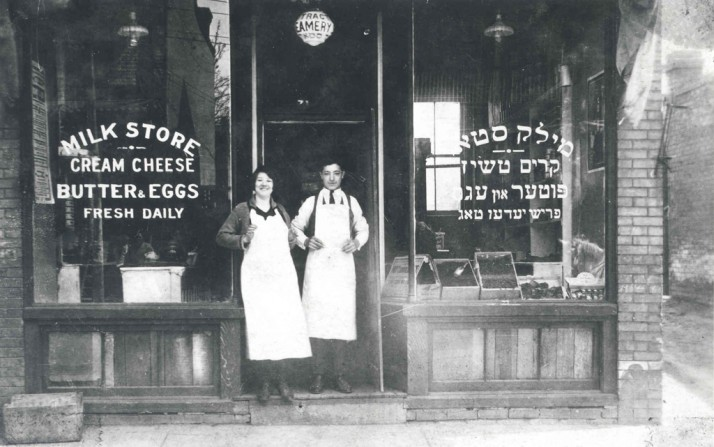
A milk store in Kensington Market, Toronto, 1903. The shop's signs, promoting milk, cream cheese, butter and eggs, are in English and Yiddish

Montreal had, and to some extent still has, one of the most thriving Yiddish communities in North America. Yiddish was Montreal's third language (after French and English) for the entire first half of the twentieth century. Der Keneder Adler (The Canadian Eagle, founded by Hirsch Wolofsky), Montreal's daily Yiddish newspaper, appeared from 1907 to 1988. The Monument-National was the center of Yiddish theater from 1896 until the construction of the Saidye Bronfman Centre for the Arts (now the Segal Centre for Performing Arts), inaugurated on September 24, 1967, where the established resident theater, the Dora Wasserman Yiddish Theatre, remains the only permanent Yiddish theatre in North America. The theatre group also tours Canada, US, Israel, and Europe.

Even though Yiddish has receded, it is the immediate ancestral language of Montrealers like Mordecai Richler and Leonard Cohen, as well as former interim city mayor Michael Applebaum. Besides Yiddish-speaking activists, it remains today the native everyday language of 15,000 Montreal Hasidim.

=== Religious communities ===
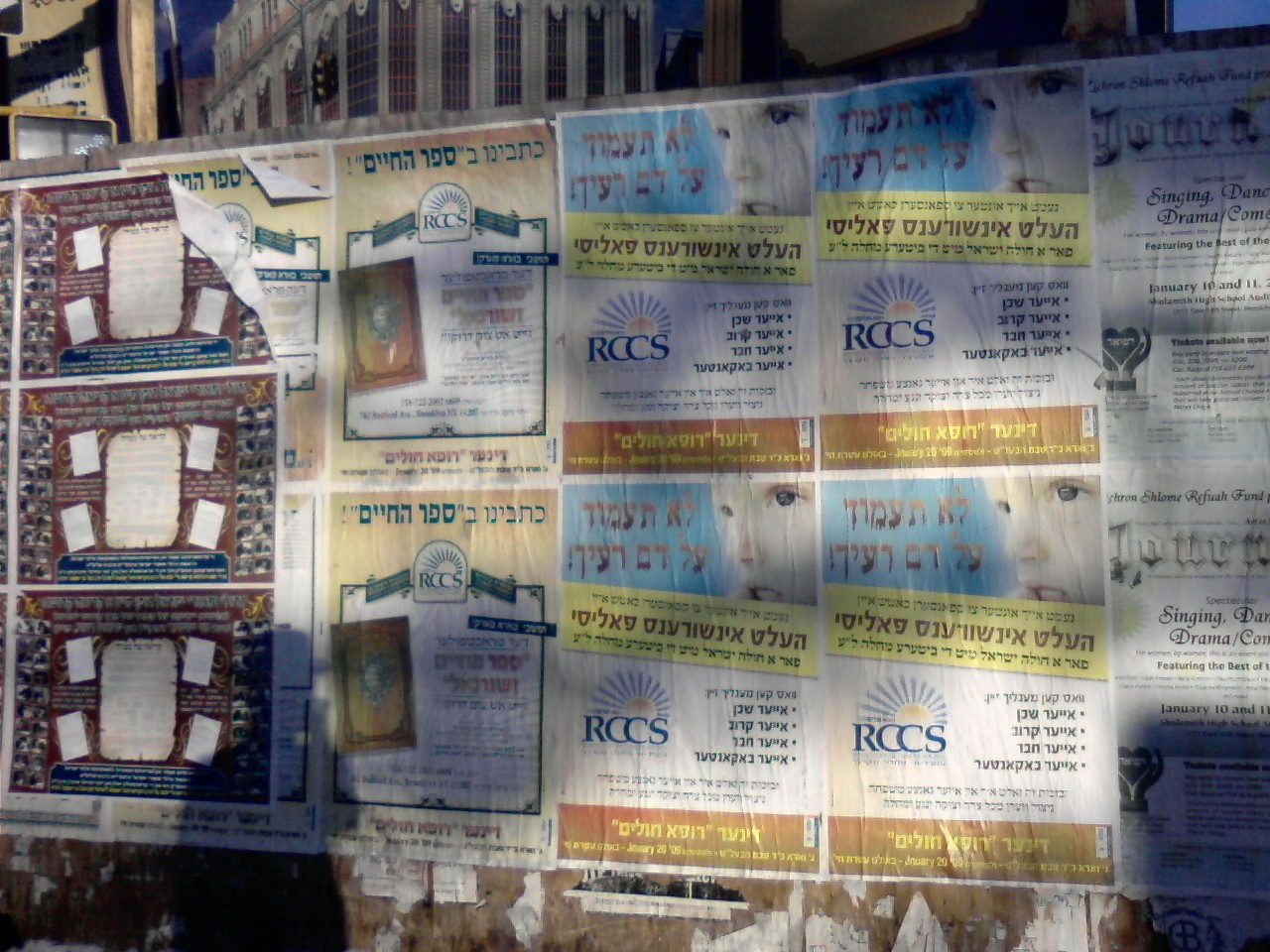
A typical poster-hung wall in a Jewish section of Brooklyn, New York

Major exceptions to the decline of spoken Yiddish are found in Haredi communities all over the world. In some of the more closely knit such communities, Yiddish is spoken as a home and schooling language, especially in Hasidic, Litvish, or Yeshivish communities, such as Brooklyn's Borough Park, Williamsburg, and Crown Heights, and in the communities of Monsey, Kiryas Joel, and New Square in New York (over 88% of the population of Kiryas Joel is reported to speak Yiddish at home.) Also in New Jersey, Yiddish is widely spoken mostly in Lakewood Township, but also in smaller towns with yeshivas, such as Passaic, Teaneck, and elsewhere. Yiddish is also widely spoken in the Jewish community in Antwerp, and in Haredi communities such as the ones in London, Manchester, and Montreal. Yiddish is also spoken in many Haredi communities throughout Israel. Among most Ashkenazi Haredim, Hebrew is generally reserved for prayer, while Yiddish is used for religious studies, as well as a home and business language. In Israel, however, Haredim commonly speak modern Hebrew, with the notable exception of many Hasidic communities. However, many Haredim who use Modern Hebrew also understand Yiddish. There are some who send their children to schools in which the primary language of instruction is Yiddish. Members of anti-Zionist Haredi groups such as the Satmar Hasidim, who view the commonplace use of Hebrew as a form of Zionism, use Yiddish almost exclusively.

Hundreds of thousands of young children around the globe have been, and are still, taught to translate the texts of the Torah into Yiddish. This process is called טײַטשן (taytshn) – 'translating'. Many Ashkenazi yeshivas' highest level lectures in Talmud and Halakha are delivered in Yiddish by the rosh yeshivas as well as ethical talks of the Musar movement. Hasidic rebbes generally use only Yiddish to converse with their followers and to deliver their various Torah talks, classes, and lectures. The linguistic style and vocabulary of Yiddish have influenced the manner in which many Orthodox Jews who attend yeshivas speak English. This usage is distinctive enough that it has been dubbed "Yeshivish".

While Hebrew remains the exclusive language of Jewish prayer, the Hasidim have mixed some Yiddish into their Hebrew, and are also responsible for a significant secondary religious literature written in Yiddish. For example, the tales about the Baal Shem Tov were written largely in Yiddish. The Torah Talks of the late Chabad leaders are published in their original form, Yiddish. In addition, some prayers, such as "God of Abraham", were composed and are recited in Yiddish.

=== Modern Yiddish education ===
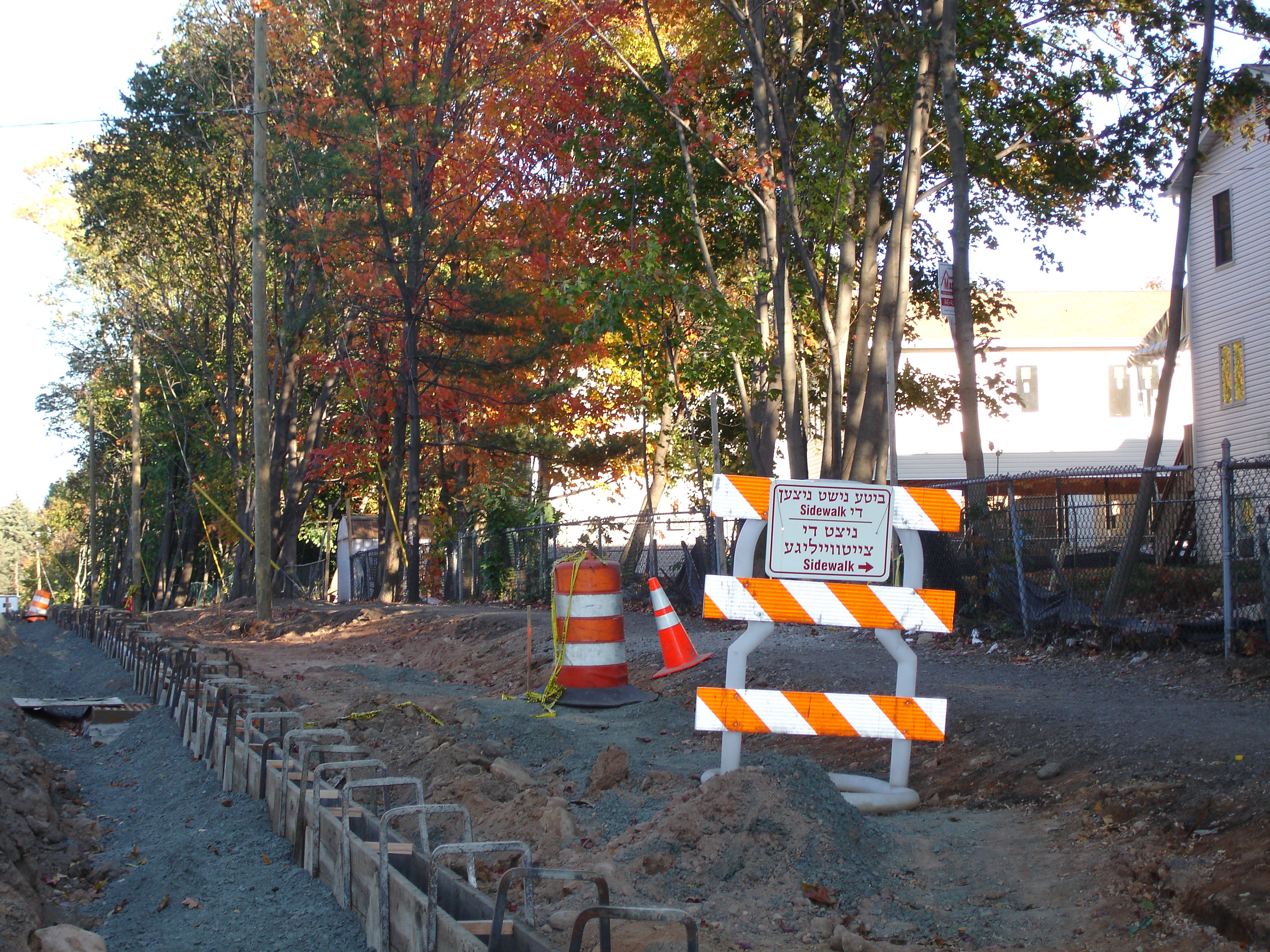
A road sign in Yiddish (except for the word "sidewalk") at an official construction site in the Monsey hamlet, a community with thousands of Yiddish speakers, in Ramapo, New York

There has been a resurgence in Yiddish learning in recent times among many from around the world with Jewish ancestry. The language which had lost many of its native speakers during the Holocaust has been making something of a comeback. In Poland, which traditionally had Yiddish speaking communities, a museum has begun to revive Yiddish education and culture. Located in Kraków, the Galicia Jewish Museum offers classes in Yiddish Language Instruction and workshops on Yiddish songs. The museum has taken steps to revive the culture through concerts and events held on site. There are various universities worldwide which now offer Yiddish programs based on the YIVO Yiddish standard. Many of these programs are held during the summer and are attended by Yiddish enthusiasts from around the world. One such school located within Vilnius University (Vilnius Yiddish Institute) was the first Yiddish center of higher learning to be established in post-Holocaust Eastern Europe. Vilnius Yiddish Institute is an integral part of the four-century-old Vilnius University. Published Yiddish scholar and researcher Dovid Katz is among the Faculty.

Despite this growing popularity among many American Jews, finding opportunities for practical use of Yiddish is becoming increasingly difficult, and thus many students have trouble learning to speak the language. One solution has been the establishment of a farm in Goshen, New York, for Yiddishists.

Yiddish is the medium of instruction in many Hasidic חדרים khadorim, Jewish boys' schools, and some Hasidic girls' schools.

Some American Jewish day schools and high schools offer Yiddish education.

An organization called Yiddishkayt (ייִדישקײַט) promotes Yiddish-language education in schools.

Sholem Aleichem College, a secular Jewish primary school in Melbourne teaches Yiddish as a second language to all its students. The school was founded in 1975 by the Bund movement in Australia, and still maintains daily Yiddish instruction today, and includes student theater and music in Yiddish.

=== Internet ===
Google Translate includes Yiddish as one of its languages, as does Wikipedia. Hebrew-alphabet keyboards are available, and right-to-left writing is recognized. Google Search accepts queries in Yiddish.

Over eleven thousand Yiddish texts, estimated as between a sixth and a quarter of all the published works in Yiddish, are now online, based on the work of the Yiddish Book Center, volunteers, and the Internet Archive.

There are many websites on the Internet in Yiddish. In January 2013, The Forward announced the launch of the new daily version of its newspaper's website, which has been active since 1999 as an online weekly, supplied with radio and video programs, a literary section for fiction writers and a special blog written in local contemporary Hasidic dialects.

Many Jewish ethnolects influenced by Yiddish are available via online resources such as YouTube.

Computer scientist Raphael Finkel maintains a hub of Yiddish-language resources, including a searchable dictionary and spell checker.

In late 2016, Motorola Inc. released its smartphones with keyboard access for the Yiddish language in its foreign language option.

On April 5, 2021, Duolingo added Yiddish to its courses.

== Influence on other languages ==
In addition to Modern Hebrew and New York English, especially as spoken by yeshivah students (sometimes known as Yeshivish), Yiddish has influenced Cockney in England, the city dialect of Amsterdam and to some degree the city dialects of Vienna and Berlin. French argot has some words coming from Yiddish.

Paul Wexler proposed that Esperanto was not an arbitrary pastiche of major European languages but a Latinate relexification of Yiddish, a native language of its founder. This model is generally unsupported by mainstream linguists.

Yiddish had an influence on Jewish Swedish, a dialect of Swedish used by Jews with loanwords from Hebrew and Yiddish. And Yiddish had an influence on Hungarian with extra influence on Jewish Hungarian, a dialect of Hungarian spoken by Hungarian Jews. Yiddish had influence on other European Jewish ethnolects like Jewish Russian and Jewish French. These ethnolects are shown in various pieces of media across various mediums both digital and physical.

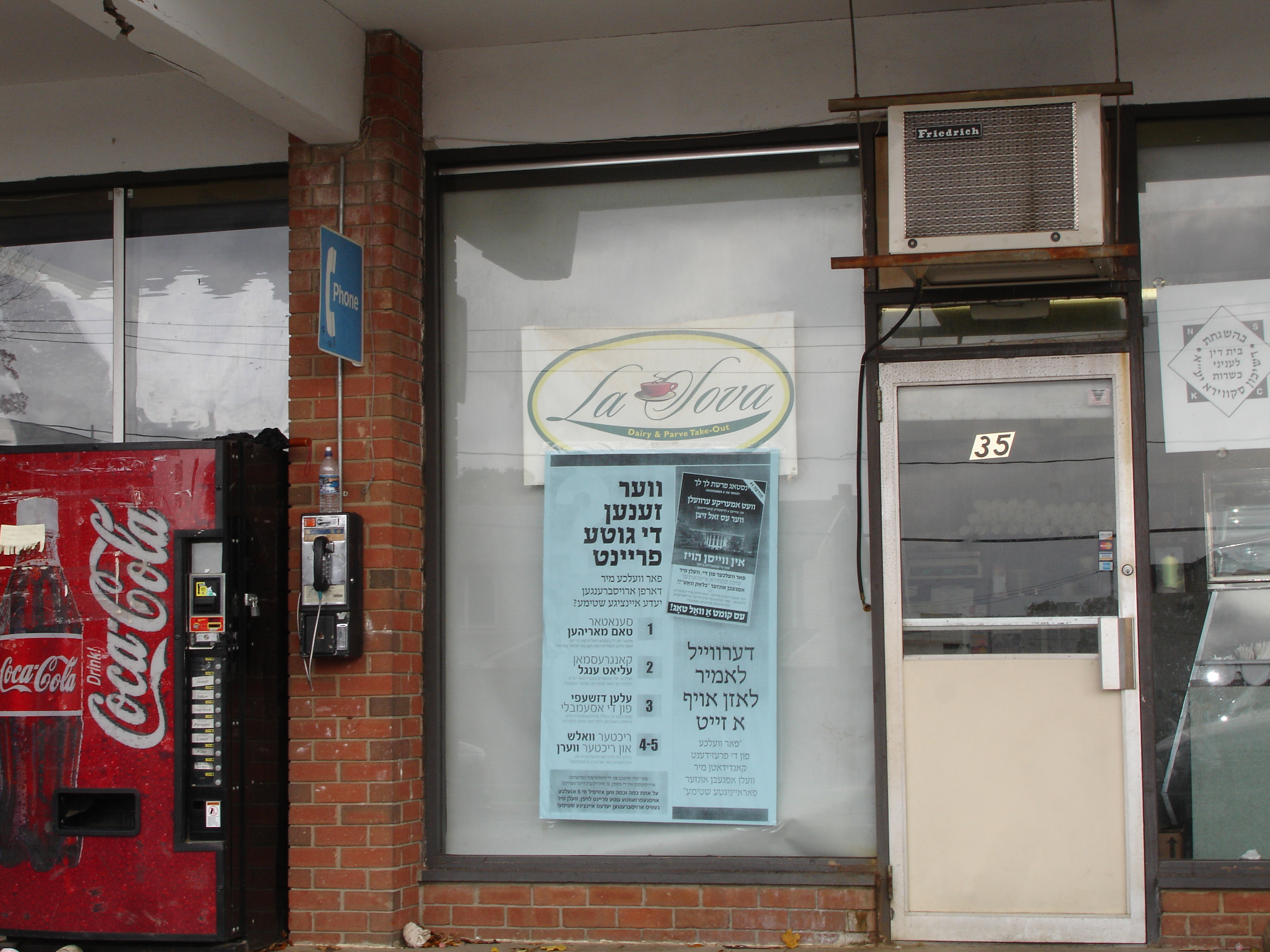
A 2008 election poster in front of a store in Village of New Square, Town of Ramapo, New York, entirely in Yiddish. The candidates' names are transliterated into Hebrew letters.

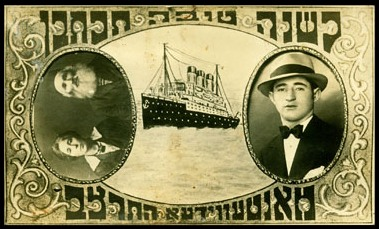
Rosh Hashanah greeting card, Montevideo, 1932. The inscription includes text in Hebrew (לשנה טובה תכתבו—LeShoyno Toyvo Tikoseyvu) and Yiddish (מאנטעװידעא—Montevideo).

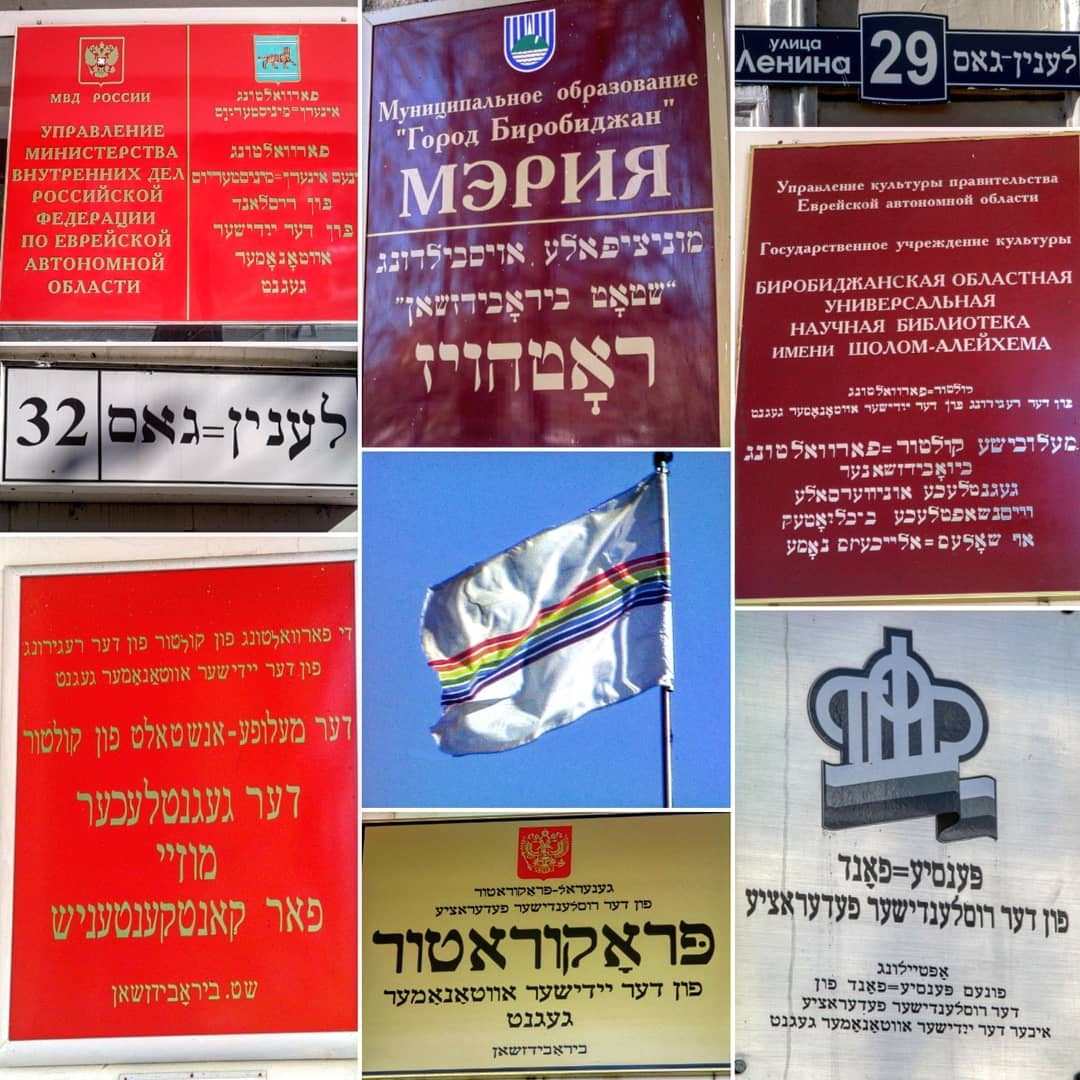
Examples of Yiddish usage in Birobidzhan public space

== Language examples ==
Example video of native Yiddish speaker talking in the Yiddish language (with English-translated subtitles)

The following is a short example of the Yiddish language written in both the Hebrew and Latin scripts with English and standard German for comparison.

Article 1 of the Universal Declaration of Human Rights
Language	Text
English	All human beings are born free and equal in dignity and rights. They are endowed with reason and conscience and should act towards one another in a spirit of brotherhood.
Yiddish	יעדער מענטש װערט געבױרן פֿרײַ און גלײַך אין כּבֿוד און רעכט. יעדער װערט באַשאָנקן מיט פֿאַרשטאַנד און געװיסן; יעדער זאָל זיך פֿירן מיט אַ צװײטן אין אַ געמיט פֿון ברודערשאַפֿט.
Yiddish (transliteration)	yeder mentsh vert geboyrn fray un glaykh in koved un rekht. yeder vert bashonkn mit farshtand un gevisn; yeder zol zikh firn mit a tsveytn in a gemit fun brudershaft.
German with wording and word order as close to the Yiddish version as possible	Jeder Mensch wird geboren, frei und gleich in Ehre und Recht. Jeder wird beschenkt, mit Verstand und Gewissen; Jeder soll sich führen, miteinander im Gemüt von Bruderschaft.
Official German version	Alle Menschen sind frei und gleich an Würde und Rechten geboren. Sie sind mit Vernunft und Gewissen begabt und sollen einander im Geist der Brüderlichkeit begegnen.
Hebrew	כל בני האדם נולדו בני חורין ושווים בערכם ובזכויותיהם. כולם חוננו בתבונה ובמצפון, לפיכך חובה עליהם לנהוג איש ברעהו ברוח של אחווה.
Hebrew (transliteration)	kol benei ha'adam noldu benei khorin veshavim be'erkam uvizkhuyoteihem. Kulam khonenu bitevuna uvematspun, lefikhakh chova 'aleihem linhog ish bere'ehu beruakh shel akhava.

== See also ==
- List of Yiddish-language poets
- List of Yiddish newspapers and periodicals
- The Yiddish King Lear – 1892 play
- Yinglish – Words from the Yiddish Language used in everyday English
- Yiddish symbols – Symbols of Yiddishist movements
- Judeo-Iranian languages – Jewish variants of Iranian languages

== Bibliography ==
- Birnbaum, Solomon (2016) [1979]. Yiddish – A Survey and a Grammar (2nd ed.). Toronto: University of Toronto Press.
- Dunphy, Graeme (2007). "The New Jewish Vernacular". In Reinhart, Max (ed.). Camden House History of German Literature, Volume 4: Early Modern German Literature 1350–1700. Camden House. pp. 74–79. ISBN 978-1-57113-247-5.
- Fishman, David E. (2005). The Rise of Modern Yiddish Culture. Pittsburgh: University of Pittsburgh Press. ISBN 0-8229-4272-0.
- Fishman, Joshua A., ed. (1981). Never Say Die: A Thousand Years of Yiddish in Jewish Life and Letters (in Yiddish and English). The Hague: Mouton Publishers. ISBN 90-279-7978-2.
- Herzog, Marvin; et al., eds. (1992–2000). The Language and Culture Atlas of Ashkenazic Jewry. Tübingen: Max-Niemeyer-Verlag in collaboration with YIVO. ISBN 3-484-73013-7.
- Katz, Hirshe-Dovid (1992). Code of Yiddish spelling ratified in 1992 by the programmes in Yiddish language and literature at Bar Ilan University, Oxford University, Tel Aviv University, Vilnius University. Oxford: Oksforder Yiddish Press in cooperation with the Oxford Centre for Postgraduate Hebrew Studies. ISBN 1-897744-01-3.
- Katz, Dovid (2007). Words on Fire: The Unfinished Story of Yiddish (2nd ed.). New York: Basic Books. ISBN 978-0-465-03730-8.
- Lansky, Aaron (2004). Outwitting History: How a Young Man Rescued a Million Books and Saved a Vanishing Civilisation. Chapel Hill: Algonquin Books. ISBN 1-56512-429-4.
- Margolis, Rebecca (2011). Basic Yiddish: A Grammar and Workbook. Routledge. ISBN 978-0-415-55522-7.
- Shandler, Jeffrey (2006). Adventures in Yiddishland: Postvernacular Language and Culture. Berkeley: University of California Press. ISBN 0-520-24416-8.
- Shmeruk, Chone (1988). Prokim fun der Yidisher Literatur-Geshikhte [Chapters of Yiddish Literary History] (in Yiddish). Tel Aviv: Peretz.
- Shternshis, Anna (2006). Soviet and Kosher: Jewish Popular Culture in the Soviet Union, 1923–1939. Bloomington, IN: Indiana University Press.
- Stutchkoff, Nahum (1950). Oytser fun der Yidisher Shprakh [Thesaurus of the Yiddish language] (in Yiddish). New York: Yidisher Ṿisenshafṭlekher Insṭiṭuṭ.
- Weinreich, Uriel (1999). College Yiddish: An Introduction to the Yiddish language and to Jewish Life and Culture (in Yiddish and English) (6th rev. ed.). New York: YIVO Institute for Jewish Research. ISBN 0-914512-26-9.
- Weinstein, Miriam (2001). Yiddish: A Nation of Words. New York: Ballantine Books. ISBN 0-345-44730-1.
- Witriol, Joseph (1974). Mumme Loohshen: An Anatomy of Yiddish. London: Philip Israel Witriol.
