= The Joys of Yiddish =

1968 lexicon by Leo Rosten of Yiddish terms in American vernacular

- Author: Leo Rosten
- Publisher: McGraw-Hill
- Publication date: 1968

The Joys of Yiddish is a book containing a lexicon of common words and phrases of Yinglish—i.e., words originating in the Yiddish language that had become known to speakers of American English due to the influence of American Ashkenazi Jews. It was originally published in 1968 and written by Leo Rosten.

The book distinguished itself by how it explained the meaning of the Yiddish words and phrases: almost every entry was illustrated by a joke. This made the book not only a useful reference, but also a treasured collection of Jewish humor.

As is inevitable with any book that references popular culture, it quickly became dated due to the dramatic changes that American culture (and Jewish-American culture) underwent over the next 30 years. Rosten published revised versions of the book with different titles: Hooray for Yiddish! (1982) and The Joys of Yinglish (1989). In 2003, a new edition of the original book was published. Titled The New Joys of Yiddish, it was revised by Lawrence Bush, with copious footnotes added to clarify passages that had become outdated. Some material was also rearranged.

== References in popular culture ==
In 1998, Charles Schumer and Al D'Amato were running for the position of United States Senator representing New York. During the race, D'Amato referred to Schumer as a putzhead. The New York Times referenced the entry for putz in The Joy of Yiddish and maintained that the phrase did not merely mean "fool", as D'Amato insisted, but was significantly more pejorative: based on that entry, a better translation might be "dickhead". D'Amato ended up losing the race; some observers credit this incident with costing him the election.

Harlan Ellison's 1974 science fiction story "I'm Looking for Kadak" (collected in Ellison's 1976 book Approaching Oblivion and in Wandering Stars: An Anthology of Jewish Fantasy and Science Fiction) is narrated by an eleven-armed Jewish alien from the planet Zsouchmuhn with an extensive Yiddish vocabulary.

Dave McKean and Neil Gaiman's 2005 fantasy film MirrorMask includes Rosten's classic riddle, discussed in The Joys of Yiddish as follows:

The first riddle I ever heard, one familiar to almost every Jewish child, was propounded to me by my father:

"What is it that hangs on the wall, is green, wet -- and whistles?" I knit my brow and thought and thought, and in final perplexity gave up. "A herring," said my father. "A herring," I echoed. "A herring doesn't hang on the wall!" "So hang it there." "But a herring isn't green!" I protested. "Paint it." "But a herring isn't wet." "If it's just painted it's still wet." "But -- " I sputtered, summoning all my outrage, "-- a herring doesn't whistle!!"

"Right, " smiled my father. "I just put that in to make it hard."

John Updike's final novel in the Rabbit series, Rabbit at Rest, copies Rosten's joke from the entry on tsuris.

== Translations ==
This book has a German translation published by Deutsche Taschenbuch Verlag, 11. 2002 and 4. 2003 ISBN 3-423-24327-9: Jiddisch. Eine kleine Enzyklopädie, a French one published by Éditions Calmann-Lévy ISBN 2-7021-2262-0, Les Joies du Yiddish and a Czech one published by Academia in 1998, Jidiš pro radost, ISBN 80-200-0707-5, republished by Leda in 2013, ISBN 978-80-7335-333-9.

== See also ==
- List of English words of Yiddish origin
- Yiddish words used in English
- Yinglish
