= Korecki =

Korecki (plural: Koreccy, feminine form: Korecka) is a Polish family name belonging to the princely Korecki family. The surname literally means "of Korets" and derives from the Korets Castle, the original seat of the family. Notable people with the surname include:

- Aleksander Korecki (born 1955), Polish saxophone player
- Samuel Korecki (1586–1622), Polish-Lithuanian nobleman
- Natasha Korecki, American reporter
- Werner Korecki (born 1928), birth name of Werner Boost, German serial killer

== Fictional characters ==
- Jan Korecki, a character from a 1903 science fiction novel On the Silver Globe by Jerzy Żuławski
