= Samuel Karol Korecki =

Polish nobleman

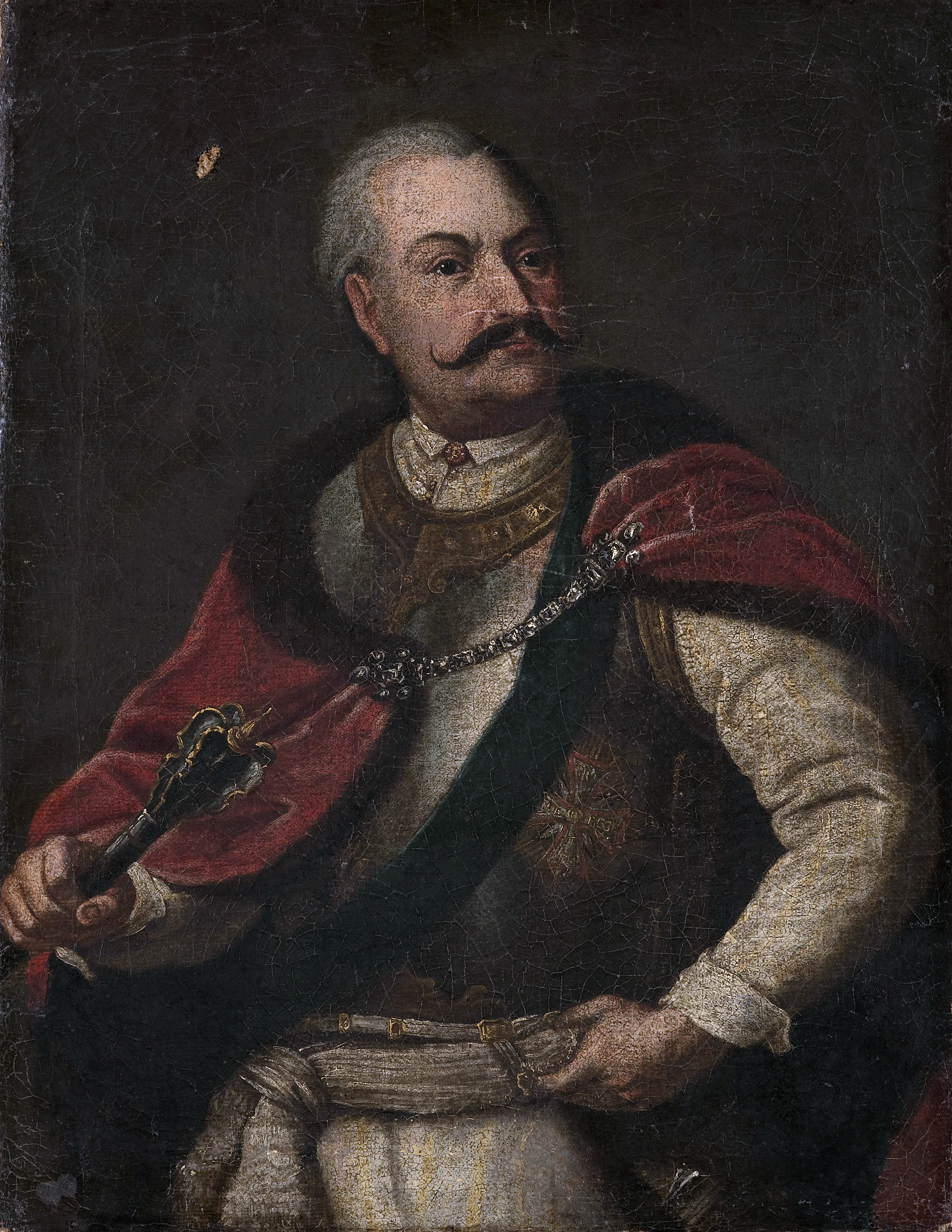
- Samuel Korecki (unknown author, 18th century)
- Born: 1621
- Died: 12 February 1651 (aged 29–30); Rytwiany, Polish–Lithuanian Commonwealth
- Education: University of Graz; University of Padua
- Partner(s): Marcjana née Ligęza; Zofia Opalińska (ca. 1620–1657)
- Parents: Karol Korecki (father); Anna Potocka (mother)
- Family: Korecki family

Samuel Karol Korecki (1621 – 12 February 1651) was a nobleman, the last representative of the ducal family of Korecki of the coat of arms of Pogoń Litewska, descended from Grand Duke of Lithuania Algirdas, son of Gediminas. He was the son of the Voivode of Volhynia, Karol Korecki and Anna, née Potock.

== Early life and education ==
Samuel Karol Korecki received a thorough education, studying at the University of Graz (graduated in 1634) and the University of Padua (graduated in 1641). He was the sole heir to a huge family fortune that covered almost the entire north-eastern corner of Volhynia. The Korecki family owned the towns of Korzec, Jarun, Miedzyrzec and Targowica, as well as extensive estates in the Braclaw and Kiev districts. Continuing family traditions, he maintained numerous court troops.

== Military service ==
In 1644, Korecki's riding regiment of 400 horses participated in the battle with the Tatars near Ochmatów. In 1645 he married Marcjanna of Ligęza, the widow of Jan Karol Tarło. During the Khmelnytsky Uprising, Samuel Korecki actively fought on the side of the Republic. In the battle of Korsuń he lost one flag. On 9 September 1648, he brought a 900-strong regiment of cavalry to the Polish camp near Piławce. On 20 June, the first day of the battle, he commanded a cavalry charge together with Samuel Łaszcz, which drove the Cossacks back to the stockade. After losing the battle, during the armistice period, Korecki returned to his ancestral town of Kort, where he twice received the deputies of the Commonwealth to Bohdan Khmelnytsky, headed by Adam Kisiel.

In 1647, Samuel Korecki pledged the town of Ilińce near Vinnytsia to Stefan Czarnecki for 40 thousand złoty. In 1649, he became the rotmistrz of the Polish-Lithuanian hussar troop. In May 1649, surrounded by Cossacks, he held out in Korets until the arrival of Polish troops under the command of regimental officer Andrzej Firlej. In mid-June 1649, together with Krzysztof Przyjemski, he was engaged in hostilities between the rivers Slucha and Horyn, commanding a troop of 600 horses and 4 cannons. On 15 June he smashed a Cossack detachment at Zwiahl. He was active in the western part of Volhynia, covering the Crown Army. In July, on the orders of King John Casimir, he was to join forces with the army of Bracław Castellan Gabriel Stępkowski, but the merger did not take place due to disputes between commanders.

Samuel Korecki arrived at the royal camp near Sokal, where he was being considered for command of a 7,000-strong corps to go to the relief of the besieged in Zbarah. He took part in the battle of Zboriv, where he commanded the advance guard, but his unit was forced to retreat by the Tatars. He fought at the head of his regiment on the left wing and, despite heavy losses, managed to repel a Tatar attack during which his horse was killed twice. He earned the nickname "vir fortissimus" (a very brave man). After the Zboriv settlement, his army was not dissolved. In the autumn of 1649, in the Braclaw province, his soldiers often conflicted with Cossacks, which could have led to renewed fighting. During this time, Korecki was healing from wounds sustained at Zboriv.

== Death ==
After being widowed, Samuel Korecki married Zofia Opalińska, widow of Stanisław Koniecpolski. The wedding took place on 6 February 1651 in Rytwiany, and the ceremony was attended by representatives of the magnates of Greater Poland and the borderlands, including the Opaliński, Radziwiłł, Czartoryski, Chlebowicz and Jelc families. During the nuptials Korecki fainted and his health deteriorated considerably. According to Antoni Rolle:

"The wedding took place, but under strangely sad auspices, as Prince Novozhenets had already been ailing for several days, his incompletely healed wound had reopened, the winter was harsh, disregarding this he exposed himself, hiding his illness from his fiancée, he did not want to worry her needlessly, however, he was barely able to make it to the end of the ceremony, he pronounced the last words of the vows unclearly, he was visibly babbling. (...) He returned from church unconscious, lay for a fortnight in a malaise, did not recognise anyone, pushed everyone away, and wanted to go to war (...) after a terrible battle with his illness, he finally succumbed to it, and closed his eyes for ever.".

Samuel Karol Korecki died on 12 February 1651 without an heir. He was the last representative of the Korecki family.

== Bibliography ==
- Maciszewski, Jarema (1968). "Samuel Karol Korecki", [w:] Polski Słownik Biograficzny. Wrocław: Zakład Narodowy Imienia Ossolińskich Wydawnictwo Polskiej Akademii Nauk.
