= Samuel Korecki =

Polish duke, nobleman, adventurer, and military commander

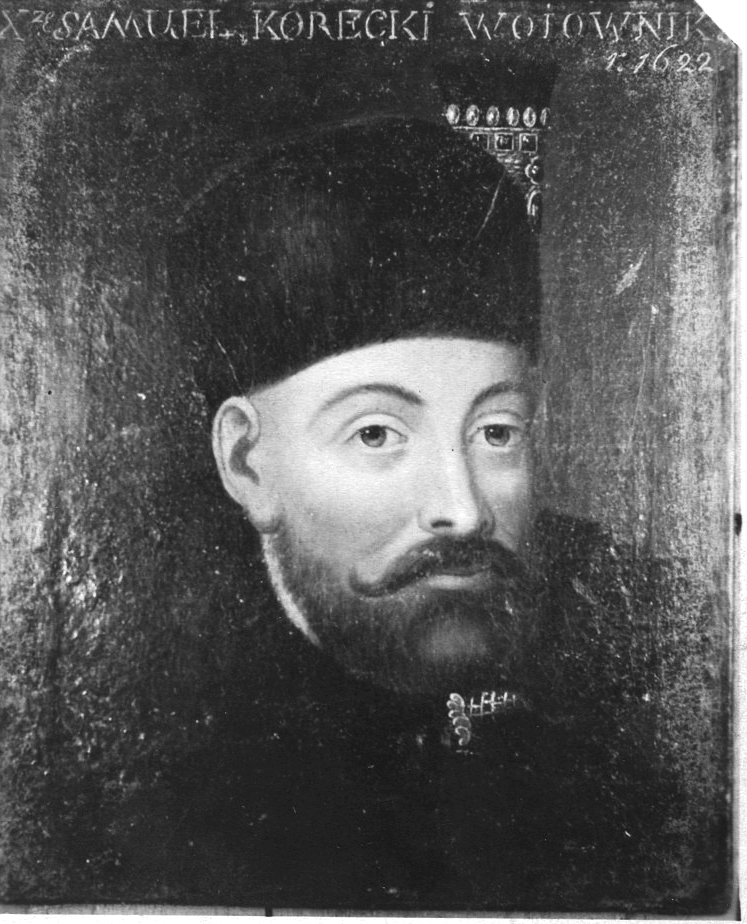
- Coat of arms: Pogonia
- Born: 1586; Korets, Polish–Lithuanian Commonwealth
- Died: 27 June 1622 (aged 35–36); Istanbul, Ottoman Empire
- Noble family: Korecki
- Father: Joachim Korecki
- Mother: Anna Korecka née Chodkiewicz

Samuel Korecki (c. 1586 – 27 June 1622) was a nobleman (szlachcic) of the Polish–Lithuanian Commonwealth, adventurer and a military commander carrying a titular rank of colonel. His coat of arms was Pogonia. He spent his life as a military man, fighting in both private and state sponsored wars.

== Life ==
His Korecki clan had their residence at Korets Castle and most likely Samuel was born there to Joachim Korecki and Anna née Chodkiewicz in 1586. He was educated in the Commonwealth and abroad.

He fought under hetman Stanisław Żółkiewski at Guzow and Kłuszyn during the Dimitriads Polish-Muscovy Wars, where in 1611 during terrible winter he brought supplies to the Polish forces in the Moscow Kremlin.

Many times duke Samuel lead his own cavalry companies against the Crimean Tatars and his successes brought him some respect among Zaporozhian Cossacks, but since he fought with Ottoman Empire vassals, the Tatars and Moldavians, he was soon listed as one of the enemies of the Porte. During the Moldavian Magnate Wars in 1616 duke Samuel, commanding his own private army and against the wishes of his king Sigismund III Vasa, invaded the Ottoman vassal Moldavia and after two victorious battles, Khotyn and Bender, was finally beaten by the Turks at the battle of Sasowy Róg (1616) near Ștefănești, and he was taken prisoner. Turks took him to the Yedikule Fortress and from that fortress he escaped, hid in a home of a Greek Orthodox priest who most likely got him onto a merchant ship going to Naples and having fought off a corsairs attack he came to Italy. There he went to Rome where he met the pope Paul V during a papal audience, and thus through his famous escape and adventurous trek he became famous throughout the Christian Europe. In spring 1618 Samuel soon again took to the field as the Moldavian Magnate wars caused an increase in Tatar raid into the Commonwealth. At the battle of Cecora duke Samuel commanded the left wing of the Commonwealth army, and during the retreat, together with many other Commonwealth commanders, such as Stanisław Koniecpolski, was taken prisoner by Tatars. Transferred to the Ottoman Turks he was imprisoned in the Castle of Seven Towers, and his capture and subsequent Turkish refusal to release him became well known throughout Europe – even King James VI and I asked the sultan for his release. Korecki was eventually strangled in Istanbul in June 1622. The Ottomans buried him in an unmarked grave, but his servant dug up his body and secretly smuggled it from Istanbul to Poland, where he was re-interred at his home of Korets.

== Family ==
Samuel was a scion of old Ruthenian and Lithuanian princely families – Korecki, being the grandson of voivoda of Volhynia duke Bohusz Korecki. He had one brother, Greater Castellan of Wołyń (Volhynia) Jan Karol Korecki, and five sisters. Duke Samuel married famously beautiful Katarzyna Catherina Movilă, daughter of Ieremia Movilă. They had one daughter, Anna Korecka, who married Andrzej Leszczyński, and in turn these parents had one son Samuel Leszczyński, who was duke Samuel's grandson.

== Sources ==
- Władysław Syrokomla, Przyczynki do historyi domowej w Polsce : (Samuel Korecki, Adam Tarło, Bogusław Radziwiłł), Warszaw 1858.
- Kasper Niesiecki, Polish Armorial – "Korona Polska przy złotey wolnosci starożytnemi Rycerstwa Polskiego y Wielkiego Xięstwa Litewskiego kleynotami naywyższymi Honorami Heroicznym, Męstwem y odwagą, Wytworną Nauką a naypierwey Cnotą, nauką Pobożnością, y Swiątobliwością ozdobiona Potomnym zaś wiekom na zaszczyt y nieśmiertelną sławę Pamiętnych w tey Oyczyźnie Synow podana TOM ... Przez X. Kaspra Niesieckego Societatis Jesu", Lwów (now Lviv), 1738, vol 2, p 607-611
