= Sefer HaTemunah =

13–14th century kabbalistic text

Sefer HaTemunah (Hebrew: ספר התמונה) (lit. "Book of the Figure", i.e. shape of the Hebrew letters) is a 13–14th century kabbalistic text. It is quoted in multiple sources on Halakha (Jewish religious law).

== Origins ==
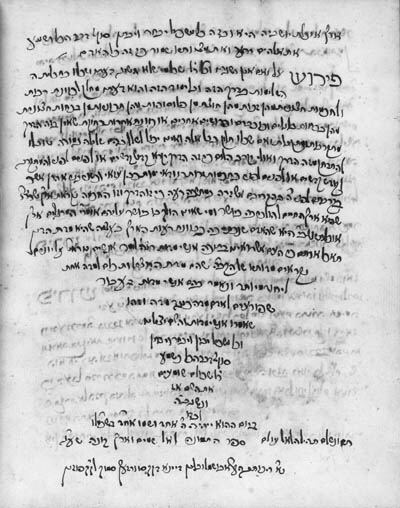
18th-century manuscript of Sefer HaTemunah, copied by Abraham Abush of Lublin

Sefer HaTemunah was probably written anonymously in the 13th or 14th century, but it is pseudepigraphly attributed to Nehunya ben HaKanah and Rabbi Ishmael, tannaim of the 1st and 2nd centuries. According to Hebrew Manuscripts in the Vatican Library Catalog, the work was composed in the 1270s. The first extant edition was published in the city of Korzec in Poland in 1784. Aegidius of Viterbo, a 15th-century cardinal, was influenced by Sefer HaTemunah, as can be seen in his writings Shekhinah and On the Hebrew Letters.

== Concepts ==
=== Sabbatical cycles ===
One of the main concepts in Sefer HaTemunah is that of the connection of the Sabbatical year (Hebrew: Shmita) with sephirot and the creation of more than one world. The author of Sefer HaTemunah believed that worlds are created and destroyed, supporting this theory with a quote from the Midrash, "God created universes and destroys them." The Talmud (Sanhedrin 97a) states that "Six thousand years shall the world exist, and one [thousand, the seventh], it shall be desolate". Sefer HaTemunah asserts that this 7000-year cycle is equivalent to one Sabbatical cycle. Because there are seven such cycles per Jubilee, the author concludes that the world will exist for 49,000 years.

The Alter Rebbe writes in Torah Ohr, that the author of Sefer HaTemunah believed that the world was currently in the second Sabbatical cycle, corresponding to Gevurah (Severity), which occurs between the cycles Chesed (Kindness) and Tiferet (Adornment). The Alter Rebbe goes so far to say that in the previous Sabbatical cycle there was a completely different world altogether, made up of its own unique purpose and even its own Torah, all in line with the Attribute of Chesed. Sefer HaTemunah offers a description of the final Shmita, Malkuth (Kingdom), as "distinctly utopian" in character. This may explain why the book was widely embraced by Kabbalists.

=== Missing letter ===
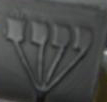
Four-pronged Shin embossed on a tefillin box

Hebrew letters are invested with special meaning in Judaism in general, and in Kabbalah even more so. The creative power of letters is particularly evident in Sefer Yetzirah (Hebrew: book of creation), a mystical text that tells a story of the creation which is based on the letters of the Hebrew alphabet, a story which diverges from that in the Book of Genesis. The creative power of letters is also explored in the Talmud and Zohar.

In Kabbalah, every Shmita corresponds to individual emotional sephirot (the lower seven sephirot from Chessed to Malchut, named middot). 13th-century scholar Nahmanides asserted that the Torah could be read differently through different pronunciation and word divisions. Building on this idea, the author of Sefer HaTemunah asserted that the Torah is read in a different way during each Shmita. The author further stated that one Hebrew letter is missing altogether from the Torah, and will be revealed only when the world moves to the next sephira.

According to Lawrence Kushner, author of The Book of Letters: A Mystical Alef-Bait, Sefer HaTemunah teaches that "every defect in our present universe is mysteriously connected with this unimaginable consonant", and that as soon as the missing letter is given to us, our Universe will be filled with undreamed of new words, the words that will turn repression into loving.

Kushner states that the letter Shin (ש) is of special interest. The letter shin that appears on the small leather cube that holds the tefillin has four prongs rather than the standard three. Some scholars say that this is the missing letter. According to these scholars, the coming revelation of the name and pronunciation of this letter will be what repairs the universe.

== Interpretation of Cosmic Shmitot in later Kabbalah ==
=== View of Luria ===
From the Medieval flourishing of Kabbalah onwards, attempts were made to systemise its diverse teachings, especially commentaries on the elusive imagery of the Zohar. Sixteenth century Safed saw the realisation of this aim in the two normative, comprehensive versions of Kabbalistic theosophy: the quasi-rational linear scheme of Moshe Cordovero, followed by the supra-rational dynamic scheme of Isaac Luria that replaced it. Their view of the earlier doctrine from Sefer HaTemunah, of previous Cosmic Shmitah cycles before ours, was that previous cycles refer to spiritual processes, not actual creations; our universe being the first physical creation.

== See also ==
- Mysticism
- Jewish views of astrology
- Kabbalistic astrology
- Sefer Raziel HaMalakh
