= Pogonia coat of arms =

Polish–Lithuanian coat of arms

Pogonia
- Alternative names: Borzezdarz, Zdarbożec, Zdarzbog
- Earliest mention: 1434
- Families: 76 names Aczkiewicz, Algiminowicz, Algminowicz, Astapko, Bepliński, Bereżko, Bielunka, Bolcewicz, Borezko, Chożowski, Chrapkiewicz, Czorb, Czorba, Dziadoń, Dziubanowski, Gedymin, Homaszewicz, Humorowski, Hunorowski, Janczura, Kłajkowski, Kłajowski, Kokatorowicz, Kondzic, Korecki, Kundzicz, Kuriata, Magóra, Memet, Minczer, Niedzieski, Odlanicki, Odlaniecki, Odlaniski, Perbesz, Piasewicz, Pikus, Pleszko, Plewako, Pliszczyński, Pliszka, Poroski, Porowski, Pogonowski, Pogoński, Repliński, Rohland, Roland, Rzepliński, Sado, Sando, Siesicki, Służka, Sąd, Stowiła, Stradoń, Sud, Sudymontowicz, Szumski, Wałęga, Wambut, Wandzon, Wędzon, Wiczewski, Wojszyski, Wonsarz, Wonson, Wunszam, Załuczski, Zręcki, Żręcki, Żurawicki, Żynowicz, Żynowiewicz, Żynowowicz, Źręcki, Żarski.

Pogonia is a Lithuanian and Polish coat of arms. It was used by several szlachta families in the times of the medieval Poland and Lithuania, the Polish–Lithuanian Commonwealth.

== History ==
The Pogonia coat of arms was firstly granted by King Władysław II Jagiełło in 1434 to Mikołaj, wójt of Lelów. It's an abatement of the Pogoń Litewska coat of arms and was granted to new members of the szlachta from the Grand Duchy of Lithuania.

== Blazon ==
The knights used to get distinctive badges in fights with enemies. The nobles used their coats of arms on shields, helmets, coats and flags. These badges were inherited from one generation to another. The knights were proud of the achievements of their ancestors. They did not change their badges unless forced to change the heraldic sign as a result of committing some offence. The oldest son inherited the coat of arms of family in West Europe, and must add some special changes in it. Four versions of coat of arms Pogonia are known in heraldry. They are different in color of shield. One is red, the other gold. In the gold shield there is an armour hand from blue cloud which holds the sword. The same hand with sword rises from the helmet.

The coat of arms is adorned with black bands with gold lining.

== Notable bearers ==
Notable bearers of this coat of arms include:

- Korecki Princes
  - Samuel Korecki
- Pogonowski

== See also ==
- Polish heraldry
- Heraldry
- Coat of arms
- List of Polish nobility coats of arms
- Pogoń
- Czartoryski coat of arms
- Pogoń Litewska

== Bibliography ==
- Alfred Znamierowski, Paweł Dudziński: Wielka księga heraldyki. Warszawa: Świat Książki, 2008, s. 104–108. ISBN 978-83-247-0100-1.
