= Hebrew alphabet =

Alphabet of the Hebrew language

- Script type: Abjad primarily, alphabet
- Period: 2nd–1st century BCE to present
- Direction: Right-to-left
- Languages: Hebrew; derivations used for Yiddish, Ladino, Mozarabic, Levantine Arabic, Aramaic, Knaanic, other Jewish languages

Related scripts
- Parent systems: Egyptian hieroglyphs: Proto-Sinaitic script; Phoenician alphabet; Aramaic alphabet; Hebrew alphabet
- Child systems: Yiddish alphabet; Square Maalouli alphabet
- Sister systems: Nabataean; Syriac; Palmyrene; Edessan; Hatran; Elymaic; Mandaic; Pahlavi; Kharosthi

ISO 15924
- ISO 15924: Hebr (125), Hebrew

Unicode
- Unicode alias: Hebrew
- Unicode range: U+0590 to U+05FF Hebrew, U+FB1D to U+FB4F Alphabetic Presentation Forms

The Hebrew alphabet or aleph-bet (Hebrew: אָלֶף־בֵּית עִבְרִי,^{[a]} Alefbet ivri), known variously by scholars as the Ktav Ashuri, Jewish script, square script and block script, is a unicameral abjad script used in the writing of the Hebrew language. Alphabets based on the Hebrew script are used to write other Jewish languages, most notably Yiddish, Ladino, Judeo-Arabic, and Judeo-Persian. In modern Hebrew, vowels are increasingly introduced. The Hebrew script is used informally in Israel to write Levantine Arabic, especially among Druze. The script is an offshoot of the Imperial Aramaic alphabet, which flourished during the Achaemenid Empire, and which itself derives from the Phoenician alphabet.

Historically, a different abjad script was used to write Hebrew: the original, old Hebrew script, now known as the Paleo-Hebrew alphabet, has been largely preserved in a variant form as the Samaritan alphabet, and is still used by the Samaritans. The present Jewish script or square script, on the contrary, is a stylized form of the Aramaic alphabet and was technically known by Jewish sages as Ashurit (lit. 'Assyrian script'), since its origins were known to be from Assyria (Mesopotamia).

Various styles (in current terms, fonts) of representation of the Jewish script letters described in this article also exist, including a variety of cursive Hebrew styles. In the remainder of this article, the term Hebrew alphabet refers to the square script unless otherwise indicated.

The Hebrew alphabet has 22 letters. It does not have case. Five letters have different forms when used at the end of a word. Hebrew is written from right to left. Originally, the alphabet was an abjad consisting only of consonants, but is now considered an impure abjad. As with other abjads, such as the Arabic alphabet, during its centuries-long use scribes devised means of indicating vowel sounds by separate vowel points, known in Hebrew as niqqud. In both biblical and rabbinic Hebrew, the letters י ו ה א can also function as matres lectionis, which is when certain consonants are used to indicate vowels. There is a trend in Modern Hebrew towards the use of matres lectionis to indicate vowels that have traditionally gone unwritten, a practice known as full spelling.

The Yiddish alphabet, a modified version of the Hebrew alphabet used to write Yiddish, is a true alphabet, with all vowels rendered in the spelling, except in the case of inherited Hebrew words, which typically retain their Hebrew consonant-only spellings.

The Arabic and Hebrew alphabets have similarities in acrophony because it is said that they are both derived from the Aramaic alphabet, which in turn derives from the Phoenician alphabet, both being slight regional variations of the Proto-Canaanite alphabet used in ancient times to write the various Canaanite languages (including Hebrew, Moabite, Phoenician, Punic, et cetera).

== History ==
Paleo-Hebrew alphabet containing 22 letters, period, geresh, and gershayim

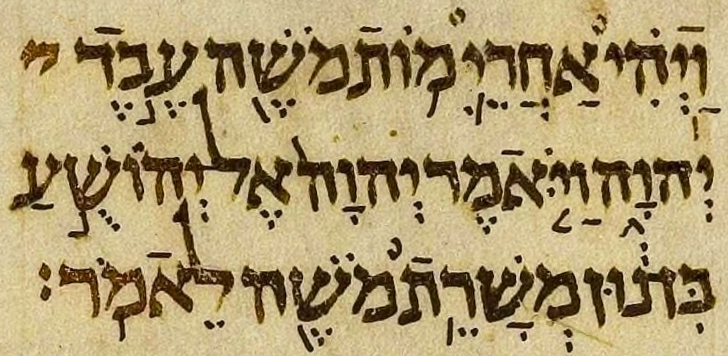
The Aleppo Codex, a tenth-century Masoretic Text of the Hebrew Bible. Book of Joshua 1:1

The Canaanite dialects were largely indistinguishable before around 1000 BCE. An example of related early Semitic inscriptions from the area include the tenth-century Gezer calendar over which scholars are divided as to whether its language is Hebrew or Phoenician and whether the script is Proto-Canaanite or Paleo-Hebrew.

A Hebrew variant of the Proto-Canaanite alphabet, called the Paleo-Hebrew alphabet by scholars, began to emerge around 800 BCE. An example is the Siloam inscription (c. 700 BCE).

The Paleo-Hebrew alphabet was used in the ancient kingdoms of Israel and Judah. Following the Babylonian exile of the Kingdom of Judah in the 6th century BCE, Jews began using a form of the Imperial Aramaic alphabet, another offshoot of the same family of scripts, which flourished during the Achaemenid Empire (and which in turn had been adopted from the Assyrians). The Samaritans, who remained in the Land of Israel, continued to use the Paleo-Hebrew alphabet. During the 3rd century BCE (after the end of the Achaemenid Empire in 330 BCE), Jews began to use a stylized, "square" form of the Imperial Aramaic alphabet, while the Samaritans continued to use a form of the Paleo-Hebrew script called the Samaritan alphabet. For a few centuries, Jews used both scripts (although use of Paleo-Hebrew was limited then) before eventually, after the 1st century BCE, settling on the square Assyrian form.

The square Hebrew alphabet was later adapted and used for writing languages of the Jewish diaspora – such as Karaim, the Judeo-Arabic languages, Judaeo-Spanish, and Yiddish. The Hebrew alphabet continued in use for scholarly writing in Hebrew and came again into everyday use with the rebirth of the Hebrew language as a spoken language in the 18th and 19th centuries, especially in Israel.

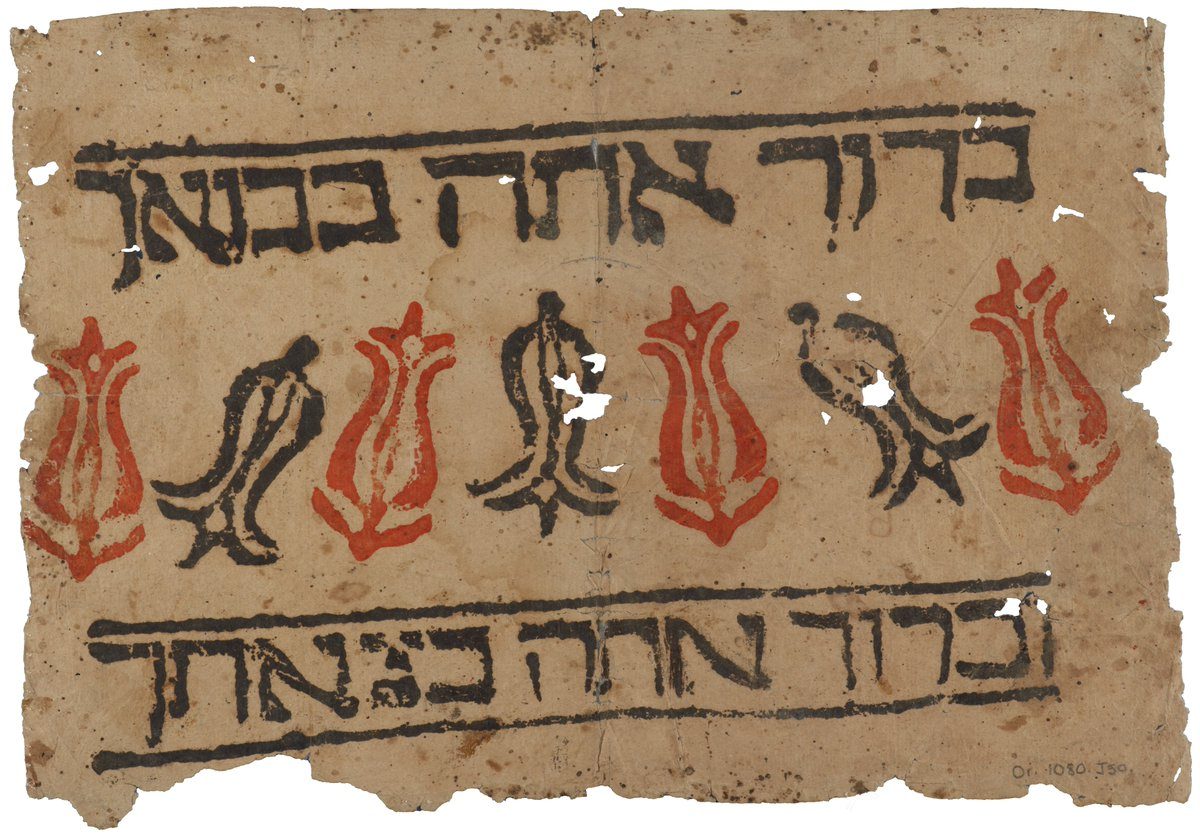
14th century tarsh blockprint from the Cairo Geniza; quoting Deuteronomy 28:6, likely intended to be hung on a doorway or as a welcome placard.

== Description ==
=== General ===
In the traditional form, the Hebrew alphabet is an abjad consisting only of consonants, written from right to left. It has 22 letters, five of which use different forms at the end of a word.

=== Vowels ===
In the traditional form, vowels are indicated by the weak consonants Aleph (א), He (ה), Waw/Vav (ו), or Yodh (י) serving as vowel letters, or matres lectionis: the letter is combined with a previous vowel and becomes silent, or by imitation of such cases in the spelling of other forms. Also, a system of vowel points to indicate vowels (diacritics), called niqqud, was developed. In modern forms of the alphabet, as in the case of Yiddish and to some extent Modern Hebrew, vowels may be indicated. Today, the trend is toward full spelling with the weak letters acting as true vowels.

When used to write Yiddish, vowels are indicated, using certain letters, either with niqqud diacritics (e.g. אָ or יִ) or without (e.g. ע or י), except for Hebrew words, which in Yiddish are written in their Hebrew spelling.

To preserve the proper vowel sounds, scholars developed several different sets of vocalization and diacritical symbols called nequdot (נקודות, literally "points"). One of these, the Tiberian system, eventually prevailed. Aaron ben Moses ben Asher, and his family for several generations, are credited for refining and maintaining the system. These points are normally used only for special purposes, such as Biblical books intended for study, in poetry or when teaching the language to children. The Tiberian system also includes a set of cantillation marks, called trope or te'amim, used to indicate how scriptural passages should be chanted in synagogue recitations of scripture (although these marks do not appear in the scrolls). In everyday writing of modern Hebrew, niqqud are absent; however, patterns of how words are derived from Hebrew roots (called shorashim or triliterals) allow Hebrew speakers to determine the vowel-structure of a given word from its consonants based on the word's context and part of speech.

=== Alphabet ===
Unlike the Paleo-Hebrew writing script, the modern Hebrew script has five letters that have special final forms,^{[c]} called sofit (Hebrew: סופית, meaning in this context "final" or "ending") form, used only at the end of a word, somewhat as in the Greek or in the Arabic and Mandaic alphabets.^{[b]} These are shown below the normal form in the following table (letter names are Unicode standard). Although Hebrew is read and written from right to left, the following table shows the letters in order from left to right:

| Alef | Bet | Gimel | Dalet | He | Vav | Zayin | Het | Tet | Yod | Kaf |
|---|---|---|---|---|---|---|---|---|---|---|
| א | ב | ג | ד | ה | ו | ז | ח | ט | י | כ |
| א | ב | ג | ד | ה | ו | ז | ח | ט | י | ך |
| Lamed | Mem | Nun | Samekh | Ayin | Pe | Tsadi | Qof | Resh | Shin | Tav |
| ל | מ | נ | ס | ע | פ | צ | ק | ר | ש | ת |
| ל | ם | ן | ס | ע | ף | ץ | ק | ר | ש | ת |

=== Order ===
As far back as the 13th century BCE, ancient Hebrew abecedaries indicate a slightly different ordering of the alphabet. The Zayit Stone, Izbet Sartah abecedary, and one inscription from Kuntillet Ajrud each contain a number of reverse letter orders; such as vav-he, chet-zayin, pe-ayin, etc.

A reversal to pe-ayin can be clearly seen in the Book of Lamentations, whose first four chapters are ordered as alphabetical acrostics. In the Masoretic Text, the first chapter has the now-usual ayin-pe ordering, and the second, third and fourth chapters exhibit pe-ayin. In the Dead Sea Scrolls version (4QLam/4Q111), reversed ordering also appears in the first chapter (i.e. in all the first four chapters). The fact that these chapters follow the pre-exilic pe-ayin order is evidence for them being written shortly after the events described, rather than being later, post-exilic compositions.

== Pronunciation ==
=== Alphabet ===
The descriptions that follow are based on the pronunciation of modern standard Israeli Hebrew.

| Letter | IPA | Name of letter | | | | | | Pronunciation |
| Letter | IPA | Unicode | Hebrew | Modern Hebrew pronunciation | Yiddish / Ashkenazi pronunciation | Sephardi pronunciation | Yemenite pronunciation | Approximate western European equivalent |
|---|---|---|---|---|---|---|---|---|
| א | [∅], [ʔ] | Alef | אָלֶף | /alef/ | /ʔaləf/ | /ʔalɛf/ | /ˈʔɔːlæf/ | When ʔ, as in button [ˈbʌʔn̩] or clipboard [ˈklɪʔbɔɹd] |
| בּ | [b] | Bet | בֵּית | /bet/ | /bɛɪs/, /bɛɪz/ | /bɛt/ | /beːθ/ | b as in black |
| ב | [v] | Bet | בֵית | /vet/ | /vɛɪs/, /vɛɪz/ | /vɛt/ | /veːθ/ | v as in vogue |
| גּ | [ɡ] | Gimel | גִּימֶל | /ˈɡimel/ | /ˈɡɪməl/ | /ˈɡimɛl/ | /ˈdʒimæl/ | g as in gourd |
| ג | [ɣ] | Gimel | גִימֶל | /ˈɡimel/ | /ˈɡɪməl/ | /ˈɣɪmεl/ | /ˈɣimæl/ | gh as in Arabic ghoul |
| דּ | [d] | Dalet | דָּלֶת | /ˈdalɛt/, /ˈdalɛd/ | /ˈdaləd/, /ˈdaləs/ | /ˈdalɛt/ | /ˈdɔːlæθ/ | d as in doll |
| ד | [ð] | Dalet | דָלֶת | /ˈdalɛt/, /ˈdalɛd/ | /ˈdaləd/, /ˈdaləs/ | /ˈðalεt/ | /ˈðɔːlæθ/ | th as in that |
| ה | [h] | He | הֵא | /he/, /hej/ | /hɛɪ/ | /he/ | /heː/ | h as in hold |
| ו | [v] | Vav | וָו | /vav/ | /vɔv/ | /vav/ | /wɔːw/ | v as in vogue |
| ז | [z] | Zayin | זַיִן | /ˈzajin/, /ˈza.in/ | /ˈzajɪn/ | /ˈzajin/ | /ˈzæjin/ | z as in zoo |
| ח | [χ] | Chet | חֵית | /χet/ | /χɛs/ | /ħɛt/ | /ħeːθ/ | ch as in Bach |
| ט | [t] | Tet | טֵית | /tet/ | /tɛs/ | /tɛt/ | /tˤeːθ/ | t as in tool |
| י | [j] | Yod | יוֹד | /jod/, /jud/ | /jʊd/ | /jud/ | /jøːð/ | y as in yolk |
| כּ | [k] | Kaf | כַּף | /kaf/ | /kɔf/ | /kaf/ | /kʰæf/ | k as in king |
| כ | [χ] | Kaf | כַף | /χaf/ | /χɔf/ | /χaf/ | /xæf/ | ch as in bach |
| ך | [x]~[χ] | Kaf | כַף סוֹפִית | /χaf sofit/ | /ˈlaŋɡə χɔf/ | /χaf sofit/ | /xæf ˈsøːfiθ/ | ch as in bach |
| ל | [l] | Lamed | לָמֶד | /ˈlamɛd/ | /ˈlaməd/ | /ˈlamɛd/ | /ˈlɔːmæð/ | l as in luck |
| מ | [m] | Mem | מֵם | /mem/ | /mɛm/ | /mɛm/ | /meːm/ | m as in mother |
| ם | [m] | Mem | מֵם סוֹפִית | /mem sofit/ | /ˈʃlɔs mɛm/ | /mɛm sofit/ | /meːm ˈsøːfiθ/ | m as in mother |
| נ | [n] | Nun | נוּן | /nun/ | /nʊn/ | /nun/ | /nuːn/ | n as in night |
| ן | [n] | Nun | נוּן סוֹפִית | /nun sofit/ | /ˈlaŋɡə nʊn/ | /nun sofit/ | /nuːn ˈsøːfiθ/ | n as in night |
| ס | [s] | Samekh | ְסָמֶךְ | /ˈsamɛχ/ | /ˈsaməχ/ | /ˈsamɛχ/ | /ˈsɔːmæx/ | s as in sight |
| ע | [ʔ]~[ʕ], [∅] | Ayin | עַיִן | /ajin/, /ʔa.in/ | /ajɪn/ | /ajin/ | /ˈʕæjin/ | When ʔ, as in button [ˈbʌʔn̩] or clipboard [ˌklɪʔˈbɔɹd]. When ʕ, no English equivalent. |
| פּ | [p] | Pe | פֵּא | /pe/, /pej/ | /pɛɪ/ | /pe/ | /peː/ | p as in pine |
| פ | [f] | Pe | פֵא | /fe/, /fej/ | /fɛɪ/ | /fe/ | /feː/ | f as in fine |
| ף | [f] | Pe | פֵא סוֹפִית | /fe sofit/, /fej sofit/ | /ˈlaŋɡə fɛɪ/ | /fe sofit/ | /feː ˈsøːfiθ/ | f as in fine |
| צ | [ts] | Tsadi | צָדִי | /ˈtsadi/ | /ˈtsadi/, /ˈtsadɪk/ | /ˈtsadik/ | /ˈsˤɔːði/ | ts as in cats |
| ץ | [ts] | Tsadi | צָדִי סוֹפִית | /ˈtsadi sofit/ | /ˈlaŋɡə ˈtsadɪk/, /ˈlaŋɡə ˈtsadək/ | /ˈtsadik sofit/ | /ˈsˤɔːði ˈsøːfiθ/ | ts as in cats |
| ק | [k] | Qof | קוֹף | /kuf/, /kof/ | /kʊf/ | /kuf/ | /qøːf/ | k as in king |
| ר | [ʁ] | Resh | רֵישׁ | /ʁeʃ/ | /ʁɛɪʃ/ | /reʃ/ | /reːʃ/ | r as in French ⟨r⟩ |
| שׁ | [ʃ] | Shin | שִׁין | /ʃin/ | /ʃɪn/ | /ʃin/ | /ʃiːn/ | sh as in shower |
| שׂ | [s] | Shin | שִׂין | /sin/ | /sɪn/ | /sin/ | /sin/ | s as in sour |
| תּ | [t] | Tav | תָּו | /tav/, /taf/ | /tɔv/, /tɔf/ | /tav/ | /tʰɔːw/ | t as in tool |
| ת | [t] | Tav | תָו | /tav/, /taf/ | /sɔv/, /sɔf/ | /θav/ | /θɔːw/ | th as in thin |

By analogy with the other dotted/dotless pairs, dotless tav, ת, would be expected to be pronounced /θ/ (voiceless dental fricative), and dotless dalet ד as /ð/ (voiced dental fricative), but these were lost among most Jews due to these sounds not existing in the countries where they lived (such as in nearly all of Eastern Europe). Yiddish modified /θ/ to /s/ (cf. seseo in Spanish), but in modern Israeli Hebrew, it is simply pronounced /t/. Likewise, historical /ð/ is simply pronounced /d/.

==== Shin and sin ====
Shin and sin are represented by the same letter, ש, but are two separate phonemes. When vowel diacritics are used, the two phonemes are differentiated with a shin-dot or sin-dot; the shin-dot is above the upper-right side of the letter, and the sin-dot is above the upper-left side of the letter.

| Symbol | Name | Transliteration | IPA | Example |
|---|---|---|---|---|
| שׁ (right dot) | shin | sh | /ʃ/ | shower |
| שׂ (left dot) | sin | s | /s/ | sour |

Historically, left-dot-sin corresponds to Proto-Semitic *ś, which in biblical-Judaic-Hebrew corresponded to the voiceless alveolar lateral fricative /ɬ/ (or /ś/).

==== Dagesh ====
Historically, the consonants ב bet, ג gimmel, ד daleth, כ kaf, פ pe and ת tav each had two sounds: one hard (plosive), and one soft (fricative), depending on the position of the letter and other factors. When vowel diacritics are used, the hard sounds are indicated by a central dot called dagesh (דגש), while the soft sounds lack a dagesh. In modern Hebrew, however, the dagesh only changes the pronunciation of ב bet, כ kaf, and פ pe, and does not affect the name of the letter. The differences are as follows:

| Name | With dagesh | | | | Without dagesh | | | |
| Name | Symbol | Transliteration | IPA | Example | Symbol | Transliteration | IPA | Example |
|---|---|---|---|---|---|---|---|---|
| bet/vet | בּ | b | /b/ | ban | ב | v, ḇ | /v/ | van |
| kaf | כּ ךּ | k | /k/ | kangaroo | כ ך | kh, ch, ḵ, x | /χ/ | loch |
| pe | פּ ףּ | p | /p/ | pine | פ ף | f, p̄, ph | /f/ | fine |

In other dialects (mainly liturgical) there are variations from this pattern.

- In some Sephardi and Mizrahi dialects, bet without dagesh is pronounced [b], like bet with dagesh
- In Syrian and Yemenite Hebrew, gimel without dagesh is pronounced [ɣ].
- In Yemenite Hebrew, and in the Iraqi pronunciation of the word Adonai, dalet without dagesh is pronounced [ð] as in these
- In Ashkenazi Hebrew, as well as Krymchaki Hebrew, tav without dagesh is pronounced [s] as in silk
- In Iraqi and Yemenite Hebrew, and formerly in some other dialects, tav without dagesh is pronounced [θ] as in thick

==== Sounds represented with diacritic geresh ====
The sounds [t͡ʃ], [d͡ʒ], [ʒ], written ⟨צ׳⟩, ⟨ג׳⟩, ⟨ז׳⟩, and [w], non-standardly sometimes transliterated ⟨וו⟩, are often found in slang and loanwords that are part of the everyday Hebrew colloquial vocabulary. The symbol resembling an apostrophe after the Hebrew letter modifies the pronunciation of the letter and is called a geresh.

Hebrew slang and loanwords
| Name | Symbol | IPA | Transliteration | Example | | |
|---|---|---|---|---|---|---|
| Gimel with a geresh | ג׳ | [d͡ʒ] | ǧ | ǧáḥnun | [ˈd͡ʒaχnun] | גַּ׳חְנוּן |
| Zayin with a geresh | ז׳ | [ʒ] | ž | koláž | [koˈlaʒ] | קוֹלַאז׳ |
| Tsadi with a geresh | צ׳ | [t͡ʃ] | č | čupár (treat) | [t͡ʃuˈpar] | צ׳וּפָּר |
| Vav with a geresh or double Vav | וו or ו׳ (non standard)^{[]} | [w] | w | awánta (boastful act) | [aˈwanta] | אַוַונְטַה |

The pronunciation of the following letters can also be modified with the geresh diacritic. The represented sounds are however foreign to Hebrew phonology, i.e., these symbols mainly represent sounds in foreign words or names when transliterated with the Hebrew alphabet, and not loanwords.

| Name | Symbol | IPA | Sound | Arabic letter (if applicable) | Example | | Comment |
|---|---|---|---|---|---|---|---|
| Dalet with a geresh | ד׳ | [ð] | Voiced th | Dhāl (ذ) | Sutherland | סאד׳רלנד | The guidelines specified by the Academy of the Hebrew Language specify Dalet with a geresh (ד׳) for transliterating [ð] and Tav with a geresh (ת׳) for transliterating [θ] in all cases; however, this guideline is consistently followed only in languages which make an orthographic distinction between the two sounds, such as Arabic, Greek, and Icelandic. In other words, the English Th is sometimes transliterated as ת׳ even when it is voiced (and therefore should be transliterated as ד׳ per the guidelines). |
| Chet with a geresh | ח׳ | [χ] | Voiceless French r | Khāʼ (خ) | Sheikh (شيخ) | שייח׳ | The sound [χ] is a native sound in Hebrew; the geresh is however used only when transliteration must distinguish between [χ] and [ħ], in which case ח׳ transliterates the former and ח the latter, whereas in everyday usage ח without geresh is pronounced [ħ] only dialectically but [χ] commonly. |
| Chet with a geresh | ח׳ | [x] | Ch in Scottish loch | —N/a | Khrushchev (Хрущёв) | ח׳רושצ׳וב | The guidelines specified by the Academy of the Hebrew Language specify Chet with a geresh (ח׳) for transliterating [x]; this guideline is almost never followed, with [x] being typically transliterated as a plain Chet (ח) or as Khaf (כ) instead. |
| Tet with a geresh | ט׳ | [ðˤ] | Emphatic voiced th | Ẓāʾ (ظ) | Hafedh (حافظ) | חאפט׳ | ט׳ is only used to transliterate ظ in scientific contexts, such as academic works and military intelligence; in other contexts, it is typically transcripted as ז, reflecting the Palestinian pronunciation of ظ as [zˤ], but sometimes as ד (as in אבו דאבי Abu Dhabi). |
| Samekh with a geresh | ס׳ | [sˤ] | Emphatic s | Ṣād (ص) | Nasrallah (نصرالله) | נס׳ראללה | The guidelines specified by the Academy of the Hebrew Language specify Samekh with a geresh (ס׳) for transliterating ص in non-scientific contexts; this guideline is almost never followed, with ص being typically transliterated as a plain Samekh (ס) in such contexts instead. In scientific contexts, such as academic works and military intelligence, ص is transliterated as צ. |
| Ayin with a geresh or Resh with a geresh | ע׳ or ר׳ | [ʁ] | Voiced French r | Ghayn (غ) | Ghajar (غجر); Ghalib (غالب) | ע׳ג׳ר ר׳אלב | The sound [ʁ] is a native sound in Hebrew; ר׳ and ע׳ are however used only for transliteration from Arabic. The guidelines specified by the Academy of the Hebrew Language prefer Resh with a geresh (ר׳); however, this guideline is not universally followed, with transliteration of Arabic in scientific contexts (such as academic works and military intelligence) exclusively favoring ע׳. |
| Tsadi with a geresh | צ׳ | [dˤ] | Emphatic d | Ḍād (ض) | Dmeide (ضميدة) | צ׳מידה | צ׳ is only used to transliterate ض in scientific contexts, such as academic works and military intelligence, where the risk of confusion with [t͡ʃ] is minimal; in other contexts, it is transcripted as ד. |
| Tav with a geresh | ת׳ | [θ] | Voiceless th | Thāʼ (ﺙ) | Thingvellir (Þingvellir) | ת׳ינגוווטליר | The guidelines specified by the Academy of the Hebrew Language specify Tav with a geresh (ת׳) for transliterating [θ] and Tet (ט) for transliterating [t] in all cases; however, this guideline is not consistently followed. Tav is used to transliterate the letter pair th even when it makes the [t] sound (as in תומפסון Thompson), albeit without the geresh if it is indeed pronounced as [t], while Spanish s and c/z are always transliterated as an [s] without observing the distinction between their sounds (in other words, following the Latin American pronunciation rather than the European one). |

Geresh is also used to denote an abbreviation consisting of a single Hebrew letter, while gershayim (a doubled geresh) are used to denote acronyms pronounced as a string of letters; geresh and gershayim are also used to denote Hebrew numerals consisting of a single Hebrew letter or of multiple Hebrew letters, respectively. Geresh is also the name of a cantillation mark used for Torah recitation, though its visual appearance and function are different in that context.

==== Identical pronunciation ====
In much of Israel's general population, especially where Ashkenazic pronunciation is prevalent, many letters have the same pronunciation. They are as follows:

| Letters | | | | Transliteration | Pronunciation (IPA) |
|---|---|---|---|---|---|
| א Alef* | ע Ayin* | | | not transliterated | Usually when in medial word position: /./ (separation of vowels in a hiatus) |
| א Alef* | ע Ayin* | | | not transliterated | In initial, final, or sometimes medial word position: silent |
| א Alef* | ע Ayin* | | | alternatingly | |
| א Alef* | ע Ayin* | | | ʼ | /ʔ/ (glottal plosive) |
| ב Bet (without dagesh) Vet | ו Vav | | | v | /v/ |
| ח Chet* | כ Kaf (without dagesh); Khaf* | | | kh/ch/h | /χ/ |
| ט Tet | תּ Tav | | | t | /t/ |
| כּ Kaf (with dagesh) | ק Qof | | | k | /k/ |
| ס Samekh | שׂ Sin (with left dot) | | | s | /s/ |
| צ Tsadi* | תס; Tav-Samekh* | and | תשׂ Tav-Sin* | ts/tz | /ts/ |
| צ׳ Tsadi (with geresh) | טשׁ Tet-Shin* | and | תשׁ Tav-Shin* | ch/tsh | /tʃ/ |

* Varyingly

==== Ancient Hebrew pronunciation ====
Some of the variations in sound mentioned above are due to a systematic feature of Ancient Hebrew. The six consonants /b ɡ d k p t/ were pronounced differently depending on their position. These letters were also called BeGeD KeFeT letters /ˌbeɪɡɛdˈkɛfɛt/. The full details are very complex; this summary omits some points. They were pronounced as plosives [b ɡ d k p t] at the beginning of a syllable, or when doubled. They were pronounced as fricatives [v ɣ ð x f θ] when preceded by a vowel (sometimes indicated with a macron, ḇ ḡ ḏ ḵ p̄ ṯ). The plosive and double pronunciations were indicated by the dagesh. In Modern Hebrew the sounds ḏ and ḡ have reverted to [d] and [ɡ], respectively, and ṯ has become [t], so only the remaining three consonants /b k p/ show variation. ר resh may have also been a "doubled" letter, making the list BeGeD KePoReT. (Sefer Yetzirah, 4:1)

- ח chet and ע ayin represented the pharyngeal fricatives /ħ/ and /ʕ/, respectively, צ tsadi represented the emphatic consonant /sˤ/, ט tet represented the emphatic consonant /tˤ/, and ק qof represented the uvular plosive /q/. All these are common Semitic consonants.
- שׂ sin (the /s/ variant of ש shin) was originally different from both שׁ shin and ס samekh, but had become /s/ the same as ס samekh by the time the vowel pointing was devised. Because of cognates with other Semitic languages, this phoneme is known to have originally been a lateral consonant, most likely the voiceless alveolar lateral fricative /ɬ/ (the sound of modern Welsh ll) or the voiceless alveolar lateral affricate /tɬ/ (like Náhuatl tl).

==== Regional and historical variation ====
The following table contains the pronunciation of the Hebrew letters in reconstructed historical forms and dialects using the International Phonetic Alphabet. The apostrophe-looking symbol after some letters is not a yud but a geresh. It is used for loanwords with non-native Hebrew sounds. The dot in the middle of some of the letters, called a dagesh kal, also modifies the sounds of the letters ב, כ and פ in modern Hebrew (in some forms of Hebrew it modifies also the sounds of the letters ג, ד and/or ת; the dagesh chazak – orthographically indistinguishable from the dagesh kal – designates gemination, which today is realized only rarely – e.g. in biblical recitations or when using Arabic loanwords).

| Symbol | Pronunciation | | | | | | | |
| Symbol | Israeli | Ashkenazi | Sephardi | Yemenite | Reconstructed | | | Imperial Aramaic (ancestral script) |
| Symbol | Israeli | Ashkenazi | Sephardi | Yemenite | Tiberian | Mishnaic | Biblical | Imperial Aramaic (ancestral script) |
|---|---|---|---|---|---|---|---|---|
| א | [ʔ, –] | [–] | [ʔ, –] | [ʔ] | [ʔ, –] | [ʔ, –] | [ʔ] | |
| בּ | [b] | [b] | [b] | [b] | [b] | [b] | [b] | |
| ב | [v] | [v~v̥] | [b~β~v] | [v] | [v] | [β] | [β] | |
| גּ | [ɡ] | [ɡ~ɡ̊] | [ɡ] | [dʒ] | [ɡ] | [ɡ] | [ɡ] | |
| ג | [ɡ] | [ɡ~ɡ̊] | [ɡ~ɣ] | [ɣ~ʁ] | [ɣ] | [ɣ] | [ɣ] | |
| דּ | [d] | [d~d̥] | [d̪] | [d̪] | [d̪] | [d̪] | [d̪] | |
| ד | [d] | [d~d̥] | [d̪~ð] | [ð] | [ð] | [ð] | [ð] | |
| ה | [h~ʔ, –] | [h, –] | [h, –] | [h] | [h, –] | [h, –] | [h] | |
| ו | [v] | [v~v̥] | [v] | [w] | [w] | [w] | [w] | |
| וּ | [uː] | [uː] | [uː] | [u(ː)] | ? | ? | ? | |
| וֹ | [o̞ː] | [əʊ, ɐʊ] | [oː] | [ø(ː)] | ? | ? | ? | |
| ז | [z] | [z~z̥] | [z] | [z] | [z] | [z] | [z] | |
| ח | [x~χ] | [x] | [ħ] | [ħ] | [ħ] | [ħ] | [ħ, χ] | |
| ט | [t] | [t] | [t̪] | [t̴̪] (1) | [t̴̪] | [t̪ˤ] (2) | [t̪ʼ] (3) | |
| י | [j] | [j] | [j] | [j] | [j] | [j] | [j] | |
| ִי | [iː] | [iː] | [iː] | [i(ː)] | ? | ? | ? | |
| כּ ךּ | [k] | [k] | [k] | [kʰ] | [k] | [k] | [kʰ] | |
| כ ך | [x~χ] | [x] | [x] | [x~χ] | [x] | [x] | [x] | |
| ל | [l] | [l~ɫ] | [l] | [l] | [l] | [l] | [l] | |
| מ ם | [m] | [m] | [m] | [m] | [m] | [m] | [m] | |
| נ ן | [n] | [n] | [n̪] | [n̪] | [n̪] | [n̪] | [n̪] | |
| ס | [s] | [s] | [s] | [s] | [s] | [s] | [s] | |
| ע | [ʕ, –] | [–] | [ʕ, ŋ, –] | [ʕ] | [ʕ] | [ʕ] | [ʕ, ʁ] | |
| פּ ףּ | [p] | [p] | [p] | [p] | [p] | [p] | [p] | |
| פ ף | [f] | [f] | [f] | [f] | [f] | [ɸ] | [ɸ] | |
| צ ץ | [t͡s] | [t͡s] | [t͡s] | [s̴] (1) | [s̴] | [sˤ] (2) | [sˤ] | , |
| ק | [k] | [k] | [k] | [g, q] | [q] | [q] | [q] | |
| ר | [ɣ~ʁ] | [ɹ]~[ʀ] | [r]~[ɾ] | [r]~[ɾ] | [ʀ] | [r] | [ɾ] | |
| שׁ | [ʃ] | [ʃ] | [ʃ] | [ʃ] | [ʃ] | [ʃ] | [ʃ] | |
| שׂ | [s] | [s] | [s] | [s] | [s] | [s] | [ɬ] | |
| תּ | [t] | [t] | [t] | [t̪ʰ] | [t̪] | [t̪] | [t̪] | |
| ת | [t] | [s] | [t] | [θ] | [θ] | [θ] | [θ] | |

1. velarized or pharyngealized
2. pharyngealized
3. sometimes said to be ejective but more likely glottalized.

=== Vowels ===
==== Matres lectionis ====
א alef, ע ayin, ו waw/vav and י yod are letters that can sometimes indicate a vowel instead of a consonant (which would be, respectively, /ʔ/, /ʕ/, /v/ and /j/). When they do, ו and י are considered to constitute part of the vowel designation in combination with a niqqud symbol – a vowel diacritic (whether or not the diacritic is marked), whereas א and ע are considered to be mute, their role being purely indicative of the non-marked vowel.

| Letter | Name of letter | Consonant indicated when letter consonantal | Vowel designation | Name of vowel designation | Indicated Vowel |
|---|---|---|---|---|---|
| א | alef | /ʔ/ | — | — | ê, ệ, ậ, â, ô |
| ע | ayin | /ʔ/ or /ʕ/ | — | — | ê, ệ, ậ, â, ô |
| ו | waw/vav | /w/ or /v/ | וֹ | ḥolám malé | ô |
| ו | waw/vav | /w/ or /v/ | וּ | shurúq | û |
| י | yud | /j/ | ִ י | ḥiríq malé | î |
| י | yud | /j/ | ֵ י | tseré malé | ê, ệ |

==== Vowel points ====
Niqqud is the system of dots that help determine vowels and consonants. In Hebrew, all forms of niqqud are often omitted in writing, except for children's books, prayer books, poetry, foreign words, and words which would be ambiguous to pronounce. Israeli Hebrew has five vowel phonemes, /i e a o u/, but many more written symbols for them:

| Name | Symbol | Written Position | Israeli Hebrew | | |
| Name | Symbol | Written Position | IPA | Transliteration | English example |
|---|---|---|---|---|---|
| Hiriq | | vowel written below consonant | [i] | i | meet |
| Tsere | | vowel written below consonant | [e̞], ([e̞j] with succeeding yod) | eh (precise pronunciation); ei (imprecise due to modern pronunciation, even if with succeeding yod – see Note 2) | bed, penguin |
| Segol | | vowel written below consonant | [e̞] | e | men |
| Patach | | vowel written below consonant | [ä] | a | father |
| Kamatz | | vowel written below consonant | [ä], (or [o̞]) | ah, (or oh) | father, login |
| Holam Haser | | vowel written above consonant | [o̞] | o | home |
| Holam Male | וֹ | isolated vowel written on its own | [o̞] | o | home |
| Shuruk | וּ | isolated vowel written on its own | [u] | u | food |
| Kubutz | | vowel written below consonant | [u] | u | food |

Note 1: The circle represents whatever Hebrew letter is used.
Note 2: The pronunciation of tsere and sometimes segol – with or without the letter yod – is sometimes ei in Modern Hebrew. This is not correct in the normative pronunciation and not consistent in the spoken language.
Note 3: The dagesh, mappiq, and shuruk have different functions, even though they look the same.
Note 4: The letter ו (waw/vav) is used since it can only be represented by that letter.

===== Meteg =====
By adding a vertical line (called Meteg) underneath the letter and to the left of the vowel point, the vowel is made long. The meteg is only used in Biblical Hebrew, not Modern Hebrew.

===== Sh'va =====
By adding two vertical dots (called sh'va) underneath the letter, the vowel is made very short. When sh'va is placed on the first letter of the word, mostly it is "è" (but in some instances, it makes the first letter silent without a vowel (vowel-less): e.g. וְ wè to "w").

| Name | Symbol | Israeli Hebrew | | |
| Name | Symbol | IPA | Transliteration | English example |
|---|---|---|---|---|
| Shva | | [e̞] or ∅ | apostrophe, e, or silent | met or silent |
| Reduced Segol | | [e̞] | e | met |
| Reduced Patach | | [ä] | a | cat |
| Reduced Kamatz | | [o̞] | o | on |

===== Comparison table =====
Vowel comparison table
| Vowel length (phonetically not manifested in Israeli Hebrew) | | | IPA | Transliteration | English example |
| Long | Short | Very Short | IPA | Transliteration | English example |
|---|---|---|---|---|---|
| ָ | ַ | ֲ | [ä] | a | fall |
| ֵ | ֶ | ֱ | [e̞] | e | men |
| וֹ | ֹ | ֳ | [o̞] | o | joke |
| וּ | ֻ | | [u] | u | duty |
| ִ י | ִ | | [i] | i | media |
| Note I: | | By adding two vertical dots (sh'va) ְ the vowel is made very short. | | | |
| Note II: | | The short o and long a have the same niqqud. | | | |
| Note III: | | The short o is usually promoted to a long o in Israeli writing for the sake of disambiguation. | | | |
| Note IV: | | The short u is usually promoted to a long u in Israeli writing for the sake of disambiguation. | | | |

=== Gershayim ===
The symbol ״ is called a gershayim and is a punctuation mark used in the Hebrew language to denote acronyms. It is written before the last letter in the acronym, e.g. ר״ת. Gershayim is also the name of a cantillation mark in the reading of the Torah, printed above the accented letter, e.g. א֞.

== Stylistic variants ==
The following table displays typographic and chirographic variants of each letter. For the letters that have different forms in word-final position, the final forms are displayed beneath the regular forms.

The block (square, or print form) and cursive (handwritten form) are the only variants in widespread contemporary use. Rashi is also used, for historical reasons, in a handful of standard texts.

Hebrew alphabet (135 CE – present): Variants
Letter name (Unicode)
| Letter name (Unicode) | | Contemporary | | | | Early modern | | Ancestral | | |
| Letter name (Unicode) | | Block serif | Block sans-serif | Block mono-spaced | Cursive | Rashi | Solitreo | Phoenician | Paleo-Hebrew | Aramaic |
|---|---|---|---|---|---|---|---|---|---|---|
| Alef | | א | א | א | | | | 𐤀 | Alef | |
| Bet | | ב | ב | ב | | | | 𐤁 | Bet | |
| Gimel | | ג | ג | ג | | | | 𐤂 | Gimel | |
| Dalet | | ד | ד | ד | | | | 𐤃 | Daled | |
| He | | ה | ה | ה | | | | 𐤄 | Heh | |
| Vav (Unicode) / Waw | | ו | ו | ו | | | | 𐤅 | Vav | |
| Zayin | | ז | ז | ז | | | | 𐤆 | Zayin | |
| Het | | ח | ח | ח | | | | 𐤇 | Khet | |
| Tet | | ט | ט | ט | | | | 𐤈 | Tet | |
| Yod | | י | י | י | | | | 𐤉 | Yud | |
| Kaf | Non-final | כ | כ | כ | | | | 𐤊 | Khof | |
| Kaf | Final | ך | ך | ך | | | | 𐤊 | Khof | |
| Lamed | | ל | ל | ל | | | | 𐤋 | Lamed | |
| Mem | Non-final | מ | מ | מ | | | | 𐤌 | Mem | |
| Mem | Final | ם | ם | ם | | | | 𐤌 | Mem | |
| Nun | Non-final | נ | נ | נ | | | | 𐤍 | Nun | |
| Nun | Final | ן | ן | ן | | | | 𐤍 | Nun | |
| Samekh | | ס | ס | ס | | | | 𐤎 | Samekh | |
| Ayin | | ע | ע | ע | | | | 𐤏 | Ayin | |
| Pe | Non-final | פ | פ | פ | | | | 𐤐 | Pey | |
| Pe | Final | ף | ף | ף | | | | 𐤐 | Pey | |
| Tsadi | Non-final | צ | צ | צ | | | / | 𐤑 | Tzadi | , |
| Tsadi | Final | ץ | ץ | ץ | | | | 𐤑 | Tzadi | , |
| Qof | | ק | ק | ק | | | | 𐤒 | Quf | |
| Resh | | ר | ר | ר | | | | 𐤓 | Resh | |
| Shin | | ש | ש | ש | | | | 𐤔 | Shin | |
| Tav | | ת | ת | ת | | | | 𐤕 | Tof | |

=== Yiddish symbols ===
| Symbol | Explanation |
|---|---|
| װ ױ ײ ײַ | The Yiddish ligature: these forms are intended for Yiddish. (They are not used in Hebrew, aside from in loan words^{[d]}.) Visually, they can be recreated using a sequence of letters, וו וי יי, except when a diacritic is inserted underneath: it does not appear in the middle. |
| בֿ | The rafe (רפה) diacritic is no longer regularly used in Hebrew. In Masoretic Texts and some other older texts, lenited consonants and sometimes matres lectionis are indicated by a small line on top of the letter. Its use has been largely discontinued in modern printed texts. It is still used to mark fricative consonants in the YIVO orthography of Yiddish. |

== Numeric values of letters ==
Following the adoption of Greek Hellenistic alphabetic numeration practice, Hebrew letters started being used to denote numbers in the late 2nd century BCE, and performed this arithmetic function for about a thousand years. Nowadays alphanumeric notation is used only in specific contexts, e.g. denoting dates in the Hebrew calendar, denoting grades of school in Israel, other listings (e.g. שלב א׳, שלב ב׳ – "phase a, phase b"), commonly in Kabbalah (Jewish mysticism) in a practice known as gematria, and often in religious contexts.

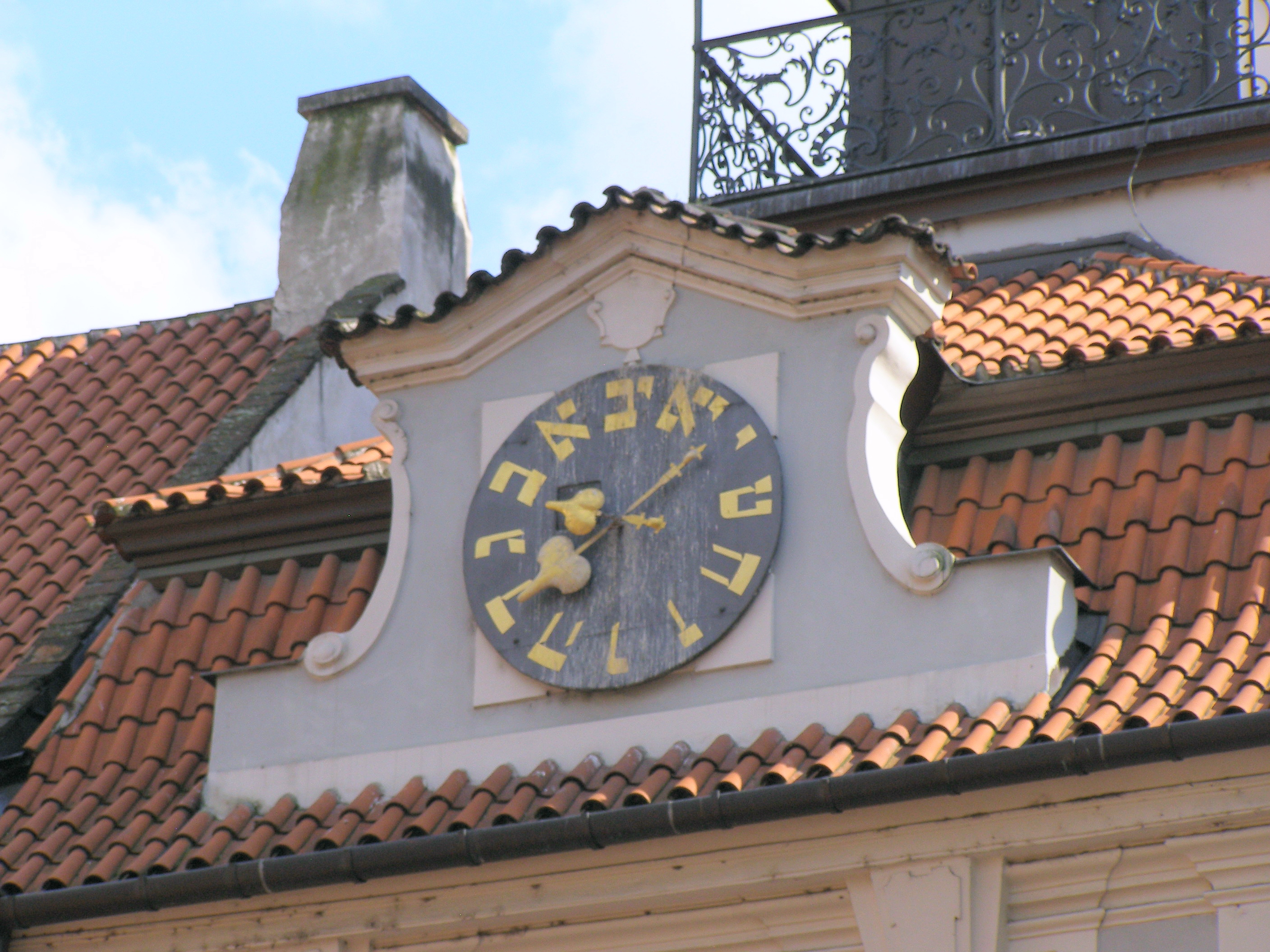
The lower clock on the Jewish Town Hall building in Prague, with Hebrew numerals in counterclockwise order.

| letter | numeric value | letter | numeric value | letter | numeric value |
|---|---|---|---|---|---|
| א | 1 | י | 10 | ק | 100 |
| ב | 2 | כ | 20 | ר | 200 |
| ג | 3 | ל | 30 | ש | 300 |
| ד | 4 | מ | 40 | ת | 400 |
| ה | 5 | נ | 50 | | |
| ו | 6 | ס | 60 | | |
| ז | 7 | ע | 70 | | |
| ח | 8 | פ | 80 | | |
| ט | 9 | צ | 90 | | |

The numbers 500, 600, 700, 800 and 900 are commonly represented by the juxtapositions ת״ק, ת״ר, ת״ש, ת״ת, and תת״ק respectively. Adding a geresh ⟨׳⟩ to a letter multiplies its value by one thousand, for example, the year 5778 is portrayed as ה׳תשע״ח, where ה׳ represents 5000, and תשע״ח represents 778.

== Transliterations and transcriptions ==
The following table lists transliterations and transcriptions of Hebrew letters used in Modern Hebrew.

Clarifications:

- For some letters, the Academy of the Hebrew Language offers a precise transliteration that differs from the regular standard it has set. When omitted, no such precise alternative exists and the regular standard applies.
- The IPA phonemic transcription is specified whenever it uses a different symbol from the one used for the regular standard Israeli transliteration.
- The IPA phonetic transcription is specified whenever it differs from IPA phonemic transcription.

Note: SBL's transliteration system, recommended in its Handbook of Style, differs slightly from the 2006 precise transliteration system of the Academy of the Hebrew Language; for ⟨צ⟩ SBL uses ⟨ṣ⟩ (≠ AHL ⟨ẓ⟩), and for בג״ד כפ״ת with no dagesh, SBL uses the same symbols as for with dagesh (i.e. ⟨b⟩, ⟨g⟩, ⟨d⟩, ⟨k⟩, ⟨f⟩, ⟨t⟩).

| Hebrew letter | Example | Translation | Standard Israeli transliteration – regular | example | Standard Israeli transliteration – precise | Example | IPA phonemic transcription | Example | IPA phonetic transcription | Example |
| א consonantal, in initial word positions | אִם | if | none^{[A1]} | im | | | | | [ʔ] | [ʔim] |
| א consonantal, in non-initial word positions | שָׁאַל | asked | ' | sha'ál | ʾ | shaʾál | /ʔ/ | /ʃaˈʔal/ | | |
| א silent | רִאשׁוֹן | first | none^{[A2]} | rishón | | | | | | |
| בּ | בֵּן | son | b | ben | | | | | | |
| ב | טוֹב | good | v | tov | | | | | | |
| גּ | גַּג | roof | g | gag | g | gaḡ | | | | |
| ג | גַּג | roof | g | gag | ḡ | gaḡ | | | | |
| ג׳ | ג׳וּק | roach | ǧ^{[B1]} | ǧuk | | | /d͡ʒ/ | /d͡ʒuk/ | | |
| דּ | דּוּד | boiler | d | dud | d | duḏ | | | | |
| ד | דּוּד | boiler | d | dud | ḏ | duḏ | | | | |
| ה consonantal | הֵד | echo | h | hed | | | | | | |
| ה silent | פֹּה | here | none^{[A3]} | po | | | | | | |
| ו consonantal | וָו | hook | v | vav | w | waw | | | | |
| וּ | הוּא | he | u | hu | | | | | | |
| וֹ | לוֹ | to him | o | lo | | | | | [o̞] or [ɔ̝] | [lo̞, lɔ̝] |
| ז | זֶה | this | z | ze | | | | | | |
| ז׳ | זָ׳רְגוֹן | jargon | ž^{[B2]} | žargón | | | /ʒ/ | /ʒarˈɡon/ | | |
| ח | חַם | hot | ẖ ^{[C1]} | ẖam | ḥ | ḥam | /x/ or /χ/ | /xam/ | [χ] | [χam] |
| ח | חַם | hot | ẖ ^{[C1]} | ẖam | ḥ | ḥam | dialectical [ħ] | [ħam] | | |
| ט | קָט | tiny | t | kat | ṭ | kaṭ | | | | |
| י consonantal | יָם | sea | y | yam | | | /j/ | /jam/ | | |
| י part of hirik male (/i/ vowel) | בִּי | in me | i | bi | | | | | | |
| י part of tsere male (/e/ vowel or /ei/ diphthong) | מֵידָע | information | e | medá | é | médá | /e/ or /ej/ | /meˈda/ or /mejˈda/ | [e̞] or /e̞j/ | [me̞ˈda] or [me̞jˈda] |
| כּ, ךּ | כֹּה | so | k | ko | | | | | | |
| כ, ך | סְכָךְ | branch-roofing | kh ^{[C2]} | skhakh | ḵ | sḵaḵ | /x/ or /χ/ | /sxax/ | [χ] | [sχaχ] |
| ל | לִי | to me | l | li | | | | | | |
| מ, ם | מוּם | defect | m | mum | | | | | | |
| נ, ן | נִין | great-grandson | n | nin | | | | | | |
| ס | סוֹף | end | s | sof | | | | | | |
| ע in initial or final word positions | עַדְלֹאיָדַע | Purim-parade | none^{[A4]} | adloyáda | ʿ | ʿadloyádaʿ | | | only in initial word position [ʔ] | [ˌʔadlo̞ˈjada] |
| ע in initial or final word positions | עַדְלֹאיָדַע | Purim-parade | none^{[A4]} | adloyáda | ʿ | ʿadloyádaʿ | dialectical /ʕ/ | /ˌʕadloˈjadaʕ/ | | |
| ע in medial word positions | מוֹעִיל | useful | ' | mo'íl | ʿ | moʿíl | /ʔ/ | /moˈʔil/ | | |
| ע in medial word positions | מוֹעִיל | useful | ' | mo'íl | ʿ | moʿíl | dialectical /ʕ/ | /moˈʕil/ | | |
| פּ^{[D]} | טִיפּ | tip | p | tip | | | | | | |
| פ, ף | פִסְפֵס | missed | f | fisfés | | | | | | |
| צ, ץ | צִיץ | bud | ts | tsits | ẓ | ẓiẓ | /t͡s/ | /t͡sit͡s/ | | |
| צ׳, ץ׳ | ריצ׳רץ׳ | zip | č^{[B3]} | ríčrač | | | /t͡ʃ/ | /ˈrit͡ʃrat͡ʃ/ | | |
| ק | קוֹל | sound | k | kol | q | qol | | | | |
| ר | עִיר | city | r | ir | | | | | [ʀ] or [ʁ] | [iʀ] or [iʁ] |
| ר | עִיר | city | r | ir | | | | | dialectical [r] or [ɾ] | [ir] or [iɾ] |
| שׁ | שָׁם | there | sh | sham | š | šam | /ʃ/ | /ʃam/ | | |
| שׂ | שָׂם | put | s | sam | ś | śam | | | | |
| תּ | תּוּת | strawberry | t | tut | t | tuṯ | | | | |
| ת | תּוּת | strawberry | t | tut | ṯ | tuṯ | | | | |

| Hebrew letter | Standard Israeli transliteration – regular | standard Israeli transliteration – precise | IPA phonemic transcription | IPA phonetic transcription |
| א consonantal, in initial word positions | none^{[A1]} | | | [ʔ] |
| א consonantal, in non-initial word positions | ' | ʾ | /ʔ/ | |
| א silent | none^{[A2]} | | | |
| בּ | b | | | |
| ב | v | | | |
| גּ | g | g | | |
| ג | g | ḡ | | |
| ג׳ | ǧ^{[B1]} | | /d͡ʒ/ | |
| דּ | d | d | | |
| ד | d | ḏ | | |
| ה consonantal | h | | | |
| ה silent | none^{[A3]} | | | |
| ו consonantal | v | w | | |
| וּ | u | | | |
| וֹ | o | | | [o̞] or [ɔ̝] |
| ז | z | | | |
| ז׳ | ž^{[B2]} | | /ʒ/ | |
| ח | ẖ^{[C1]} | ḥ | /x/ or /χ/ | [χ] |
| ח | ẖ^{[C1]} | ḥ | dialectical [ħ] | |
| ט | t | ṭ | | |
| י consonantal | y | | /j/ | |
| י part of hirik male (/i/ vowel) | i | | | |
| י part of tsere male (/e/ vowel or /ei/ diphthong) | e | é | /e/ or /ej/ | [e̞] or [e̞j]/ |
| כּ, ךּ | k | | | |
| כ, ך | kh^{[C2]} | ḵ | /x/ or /χ/ | [χ] |
| ל | l | | | |
| מ, ם | m | | | |
| נ, ן | n | | | |
| ס | s | | | |
| ע in initial or final word positions | none^{[A4]} | ʿ | | only in initial word position [ʔ] |
| ע in initial or final word positions | none^{[A4]} | ʿ | dialectical /ʕ/ | |
| ע in medial word positions | ' | ʿ | /ʔ/ | |
| ע in medial word positions | ' | ʿ | dialectical /ʕ/ | |
| פּ^{[D]} | p | | | |
| פ, ף | f | | | |
| צ, ץ | ts | ẓ | /t͡s/ | |
| צ׳, ץ׳ | č^{[B3]} | | /t͡ʃ/ | |
| ק | k | q | | |
| ר | r | | | [ʀ] or [ʁ] |
| ר | r | | | dialectical [r] or [ɾ] |
| שׁ | sh | š | /ʃ/ | |
| שׂ | s | ś | | |
| תּ | t | t | | |
| ת | t | ṯ | | |

Notes

^{A1234}In transliterations of modern Israeli Hebrew, initial and final ע (in regular transliteration), silent or initial א, and silent ה are not transliterated. To the eye of readers orientating themselves on Latin (or similar) alphabets, these letters might seem to be transliterated as vowel letters; however, these are in fact transliterations of the vowel diacritics – niqqud (or are representations of the spoken vowels). E.g., in אִם ("if", [ʔim]), אֵם ("mother", [ʔe̞m]) and אֹם ("nut", [ʔo̞m]), the letter א always represents the same consonant: [ʔ] (glottal stop), whereas the vowels /i/, /e/ and /o/ respectively represent the spoken vowel, whether it is orthographically denoted by diacritics or not. Since the Academy of the Hebrew Language ascertains that א in initial position is not transliterated, the symbol for the glottal stop ʾ is omitted from the transliteration, and only the subsequent vowels are transliterated (whether or not their corresponding vowel diacritics appeared in the text being transliterated), resulting in "im", "em" and "om", respectively.

^{B123}The diacritic geresh ⟨׳⟩ is used with some other letters as well (ד׳, ח׳, ט׳, ע׳, ר׳, ת׳), but only to transliterate from other languages to Hebrew – never to spell Hebrew words; therefore they were not included in this table (correctly translating a Hebrew text with these letters would require using the spelling in the language from which the transliteration to Hebrew was originally made). The non-standard ⟨ו׳⟩ and ⟨וו⟩ ^{[e1]} are sometimes used to represent /w/, which like /d͡ʒ/, /ʒ/ and /t͡ʃ/ appears in Hebrew slang and loanwords.

^{C12}The sound /χ/ (as ⟨ch⟩ in loch) is often transcribed ⟨ch⟩, inconsistently with the guidelines specified by the Academy of the Hebrew Language: חם /χam/ → "cham"; סכך /sχaχ/ → "schach".

^{D}Although the Bible does include a single occurrence of a final pe with a dagesh (Book of Proverbs 30, 6: אַל-תּוֹסְףְּ עַל-דְּבָרָיו: פֶּן-יוֹכִיחַ בְּךָ וְנִכְזָבְתָּ.), in modern Hebrew /p/ is always represented by pe in its regular, not final, form פ, even when in word-final position, which occurs with loanwords (e.g. שׁוֹפּ /ʃop/ "shop"), foreign names (e.g. פִילִיפּ /ˈfilip/ "Philip") and some slang (e.g. חָרַפּ /χaˈrap/ "slept deeply").

== Religious use ==
The signet ring of God is "Emess" (Truth), which contains the first, middle, and last of the Hebrew Alphabet; for God is within everything, surrounds everything, and nothing is outside of Him

— Maggid of Mezeritch

The letters of the Hebrew alphabet have played varied roles in Jewish religious literature over the centuries, primarily in mystical texts. Some sources in classical rabbinical literature seem to acknowledge the historical provenance of the currently used Hebrew alphabet and deal with them as a mundane subject (the Jerusalem Talmud, for example, records that "the Israelites took for themselves square calligraphy", and that the letters "came with the Israelites from Ashur [Assyria]"); others attribute mystical significance to the letters, connecting them with the process of creation or the redemption. In mystical conceptions, the alphabet is considered eternal, pre-existent to the Earth, and the letters themselves are seen as having holiness and power, sometimes to such an extent that several stories from the Talmud illustrate the idea that they cannot be destroyed.

The idea of the letters' creative power finds its greatest vehicle in the Sefer Yezirah, or Book of Creation, a mystical text of uncertain origin which describes a story of creation highly divergent from that in the Book of Genesis, largely through exposition on the powers of the letters of the alphabet: the letters are connected with the planets of universe, the astrology, with all parts of human-body and their "cause-effect reactions", the Sefirot and the ways of spiritual and material life; so Bereshit Rabbah, the Midrash of Genesis, teaches that God did the world with his wisdom, that is the Torah with the letters of Hebrew. In Kabbalah all letters had the symbolic value that could be studied with trascendent exegesis, i.e. the "sod" of Pardes; the created things (mineral, vegetal, animal and human levels of this world) have hebrew names which conceal their essential nature, like the first man Adam who was knowing all names of all animals. The supposed creative powers of the letters are also referenced in the Talmud and Zohar.

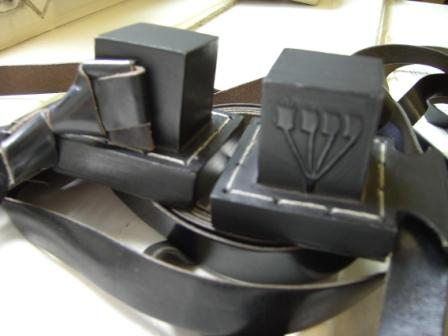
The four-pronged Shin

Another book, the 13th-century Kabbalistic text Sefer HaTemunah, holds that a single letter of unknown pronunciation, held by some to be the four-pronged shin on one side of the teffilin box, is missing from the current alphabet. The world's flaws, the book teaches, are related to the absence of this letter, the eventual revelation of which will repair the universe. Another example of messianic significance attached to the letters is the teaching of Rabbi Eliezer that the five letters of the alphabet with distinct final forms hold the "secret of redemption".

In addition, the letters occasionally feature in aggadic portions of non-mystical rabbinic literature. In such aggada the letters are often given anthropomorphic qualities and depicted as speaking to God. Commonly their shapes are used in parables to illustrate points of ethics or theology. An example from the Babylonian Talmud (a parable intended to discourage speculation about the universe before creation); there is a discussion about this in "Kabbalah-texts": this Creation was created at first time only with Genesis, not before. So great Rabbanim explain that God has to create the universe in a moment that we don’t know why… before or after. God has not time, that is a category of material world, so we cannot explain what is the reason of Creation not but for Glory of God. In any case God creates "Homer Hayiulì" before this Creation as part of all things, that is the Hyle:

Why does the story of creation begin with bet? ... In the same manner that the letter bet is closed on all sides and only open in front, similarly you are not permitted to inquire into what is before or what was behind, but only from the actual time of Creation.

— Babylonian Talmud, Tractate Hagigah, 77c

Extensive instructions about the proper methods of forming the letters are found in Mishnat Soferim, within Mishna Berura of Yisrael Meir Kagan.

== Mathematical use ==
In set theory, $\aleph_0$, pronounced aleph-naught, aleph-zero, or aleph-null, is used to mark the cardinal number of an infinite countable set, such as $\mathbb Z$, the set of all integers. More generally, the $\aleph_\alpha$ aleph number notation marks the ordered sequence of all distinct infinite cardinal numbers.

Less frequently used, the $\beth_\alpha$ beth number notation is used for the iterated power sets of $\aleph_0$. The second element $\beth_1$ is the cardinality of the continuum. Very occasionally, a gimel function is used in cardinal notation.

== Unicode and HTML ==
An example of a Hebrew keyboard

The Unicode Hebrew block extends from U+0590 to U+05FF and from U+FB1D to U+FB4F. It includes letters, ligatures, combining diacritical marks (Niqqud and cantillation marks) and punctuation. The Numeric Character References is included for HTML. These can be used in many markup languages, and they are often used in Wiki to create the Hebrew glyphs compatible with the majority of web browsers.

Standard Hebrew keyboards have a 101-key layout. Like the standard QWERTY layout, the Hebrew layout was derived from the order of letters on Hebrew typewriters.

== See also ==
- Hebrew braille
- Hebrew diacritics
- Cursive Hebrew
- Hebrew punctuation
- Hebrew spelling
- Inverted nun
- Koren Type
- Ktiv hasar niqqud ("spelling lacking niqqud")
- Significance of numbers of Judaism
- Sefer Yetzirah

== Notes ==
^{a}"Alef-bet" is commonly written in Israeli Hebrew without the maqaf (מקף, "[Hebrew] hyphen"), אלפבית עברי, as opposed to with the hyphen, אלף־בית עברי.

^{b}The letters of the Arabic and Mandaic alphabets generally have four forms each, according to their position within the word (initial, medial, final, or isolate). (There are exceptions in both alphabets: in the Arabic, six of the 28 letters have only two forms each; in the Mandaic, three of the 22 have only a single form.)

^{c}In forms of Hebrew older than Modern Hebrew, בי״ת, כ״ף, and פ״א can only be read b, k and p, respectively, at the beginning of a word, while they will have the sole value of v, kh and f in a sofit (final) position; there are few exceptions. (In medial positions, both pronunciations are possible.)

In Modern Hebrew the restriction is much less absolute, e.g. פִיזִיקַאי /fiziˈkaj/ and never /piziˈkaj/ (= "physicist"), סְנוֹבּ /snob/ and never /snov/ (= "snob"). A dagesh may be inserted to unambiguously denote the plosive (b/k/p) variant: בּ = /b/, כּ = /k/, פּ =/p/; similarly (though today very rare in Hebrew, common only in Yiddish) a rafé placed above the letter unambiguously denotes the fricative (v/kh/f) variant: בֿ = /v/, כֿ = /χ/ and פֿ = /f/.

In Modern Hebrew orthography, the sound [p] at the end of a word is denoted by the regular form פ, as opposed to the final form ף, which always denotes [f] (see table of transliterations and transcriptions, comment^{[D]}).

^{d}A pair of separate vavs, וו, sometimes occurs in Ktiv male: this is different from the Yiddish ligature װ.

^{e1 e2e3e4e5}The Academy of the Hebrew Language states that both [v] and [w] should be indistinguishably represented in Hebrew using the letter vav. Where this guideline is followed Hebrew readers must rely on context and former knowledge to pronounce foreign words and loanwords containing the [w] sound.

Where the vav is doubled this is not to denote [w]. A double vav is used in ktiv male to denote the phoneme /v/ at a medial position in a word (where a single vav would denote one of the phonemes /u/ or /o/).

== Bibliography ==
- Gesenius' Hebrew Grammar, §5 ff.
- Berlin, Adele (2004). Lamentations: A Commentary. Westminster John Knox Press. ISBN 9780664229740.
- First, Mitchell (June 2014). "Using the Pe–Ayin Order of the Abecedaries of Ancient Israel to Date the Book of Psalms". Journal for the Study of the Old Testament. 38 (4): 471–485. doi:10.1177/0309089214536490. ISSN 0309-0892. S2CID 170926400.
- First, Mitchell (2017). Pe before Ayin in Biblical Pre-Exilic Acrostics.
- Goldingay, John (2022). The Book of Lamentations. Eerdmans Publishing Company. ISBN 9780802825421.
- Hoffman, Joel M. 2004. In the Beginning: A Short History of the Hebrew Language. New York: New York University Press.
- Pitre, Brant J.; Bergsma, John S. (2018). A Catholic Introduction to the Bible: The Old Testament. Ignatius Press. p. 280. ISBN 978-1-58617-722-5.
- Saénz-Badillos, Angel (1993). A History of the Hebrew Language. Cambridge, UK: Cambridge University Press.
- Steinberg, David. History of the Hebrew Language.
