= Korecki family =

Polish–Lithuanian princely family

Korecki
- Pogonia
- Origin: Korets, Volhynia

The House of Korecki (Polish: ród Koreckich (Korecki clan), Koreccy) was a princely family originating from the Grand Duchy of Lithuania. The name is derived from the original seat of the family at the Korets Castle (now in Ukraine's Rivne Oblast).

There are two family legends about the descent. By one of them it descended from Patrikas, son of Narymunt, the second eldest son of Gediminas. By another legend, it derives from Kaributas, son of Algirdas, Grand Duke of Lithuania.

The princely family line became extinct in the 17th century.

== Coat of arms ==
The family used the Pogonia coat of arms, granted to Lithuanian noblemen upon the union into the Polish–Lithuanian Commonwealth.

== Notable members ==
- Samuel Korecki (1586–1622), a nobleman of the Polish–Lithuanian Commonwealth
- Karol Korecki
- Bohusz Korecki
- Samuel Karol Korecki (1621–1651)

== See also ==
- Korecki
