= Hebrew diacritics =

System of marks added to Hebrew letters

Gen. 1:9 And God said, "Let the waters be collected". Letters in black, pointing in red, cantillation in blue

Hebrew orthography includes three types of diacritics:

- Niqqud in Hebrew is the way to indicate vowels, which are omitted in modern orthography, using a set of ancillary glyphs. Since the vowels can be understood from surrounding letters, context can help readers read the correct pronunciations of several letters of the Hebrew alphabet (the rafe sign and other rare glyphs are also listed as part of the niqqud system but are not in common use)^{[*]};
- geresh and gershayim, two diacritics that are not considered a part of niqqud, each of which has several functions (e.g. to denote Hebrew numerals);
- and cantillation, "accents" which are used exclusively to indicate how Biblical passages should be chanted and may possess a punctuating function.

Several diacritical systems were developed in the Early Middle Ages. The most widespread system, and the only one still used to a significant degree today, was created by the Masoretes of Tiberias in the second half of the first millennium in the Land of Israel (see Masoretic Text, Tiberian Hebrew). The Niqqud signs and cantillation marks developed by the Masoretes are small in size compared to consonants, so they could be added to the consonantal texts without retranscribing them.

== Pointing (niqqud) ==
In modern Israeli orthography, vowel and consonant pointing is seldom used, except in specialised texts such as dictionaries, poetry, or texts for children or for new immigrants. Israeli Hebrew has five vowel phonemes—/i/, /e/, /a/, /o/ and /u/—but many more written symbols for them. Niqqud distinguish the following vowels and consonants; for more detail, see the main article.

Name	Symbol	Unicode	Israeli Hebrew			Keyboard input		Hebrew	Alternate Names
Name	Symbol	Unicode	IPA	Transliteration	English Example	Letter	Key	Hebrew	Alternate Names
Hiriq	אִ	U+05B4	[i]	i	seek	4		חִירִיק	‒
Tzere	אֵ	U+05B5	[e̞] or [ei̯]	e or ei	men	5		צֵירֵי or צֵירֶה	‒
Segol	אֶ	U+05B6	[e̞] or [ei̯] (with succeeding yod)	e or ei (with succeeding yod)	men	6		סֶגוֹל	‒
Patach	אַ	U+05B7	[ä]	a	far	7		פַּתָּח	‒
Kamatz	אָ	U+05B8	[ä]	a	far	8		קָמָץ	‒
Kamatz Katan	אׇ	U+05C7	[o̞]	o	for	8		קָמָץ	‒
Sin dot (left)	שׂ	U+05C2	[s]	s	sour	9		שִׂי״ן	‒
Shin dot (right)	שׁ	U+05C1	[ʃ]	sh	shop	0		שִׁי״ן	‒
Holam Haser	אֹ	U+05B9	[o̞]	o	bore	-		חוֹלָם חָסֵר	‒
Holam Male	וֹ	U+05B9	[o̞]	o	bore	-		חוֹלָם מָלֵא	‒
Vav Haluma; Holam Haser for Vav	וֺ	U+05BA	[vo̞]	vo	vaunt			וָו הֲלוּמָה	‒
Dagesh or Mappiq	בּ	U+05BC	N/A	N/A	N/A	=		דָּגֵשׁ or מַפִּיק	‒
Shuruk	וּ	U+05BC	[u]	u	cool	=		שׁוּרוּק	‒
Kubutz	אֻ	U+05BB	[u]	u	cool	\		קֻבּוּץ	
Below: Two vertical dots underneath the letter (called sh'va) make the vowel very short.
Shva	אְ	U+05B0	[e̞] or ∅	', e or nothing	silent	~		שְׁוָא	‒
Reduced Segol	אֱ	U+05B1	[e̞]	e	men	1		חֲטַף סֶגוֹל	Hataf Segol
Reduced Patach	אֲ	U+05B2	[ä]	a	far	2		חֲטַף פַּתָּח	Hataf Patakh
Reduced Kamatz	אֳ	U+05B3	[o̞]	o	bore	3		חֲטַף קָמָץ	Hataf Kamatz

Note 1: The letters "א" or "ב"represent whatever Hebrew letter is used.
Note 2: The letter "ש" is used since it can only be represented by that letter.
Note 3: The dagesh, mappiq, and shuruk are different, however, they look the same and are inputted in the same manner. Also, they are represented by the same Unicode character.
Note 4: The letter "ו" is used since it can only be represented by that letter.

=== Vowel comparison table ===
Vowel Comparison Table
Vowel length^{[1]}						IPA	Transliteration	English example
Long		Short		Very short		IPA	Transliteration	English example
אָ	^{[3]}	אַ		אֲ	^{[2]}	[ä]	a	far
וֹ	^{[3]}	אׇ	^{[3]}	אֳ	^{[2]}	[o̞]	o	cold
וּ	^{[4]}	אֻ	^{[4]}		N/A	[u]	u	you
אִי		אִ			N/A	[i]	i	ski
אֵ		אֶ		אֱ	^{[2]}	[e̞]	e	let

Notes:

- ^{[1]} : These vowels lengths are not manifested in Modern Hebrew.
- ^{[2]} : Adding two vertical dots (sh'va) to the "short-vowel" diacritic produces the diacritic for "very short vowel" (Hebrew: חטף ḥatáf ).
- ^{[3]} : The short /o/ is usually promoted to a long /o/ (holam male, vav with dot above) in Israeli writing for the sake of disambiguation.
- ^{[4]} : The short /u/ is usually promoted to a long /u/ (shuruk, vav with middle dot) in Israeli writing for the sake of disambiguation.

== Meteg ==
Meteg is a vertical bar placed below a character next to the niqqud for various purposes, including marking vowel length and secondary stress. Its shape is identical to the cantillation mark sof pasuq.

== Geresh ==
Geresh is a mark, ⟨׳⟩ that may be used as a diacritic, as a punctuation mark for initialisms, or as a marker of Hebrew numerals. It is also used in cantillation.

As a diacritic, the geresh is combined with the following consonants:

letter	value	with geresh	value	English example	usage
ג	[ɡ]	ג׳	[dʒ]	age	slang and loanwords (phonologically native sounds)
ז	[z]	ז׳	[ʒ]	vision	slang and loanwords (phonologically native sounds)
צ	[ts]	צ׳	[tʃ]	change	slang and loanwords (phonologically native sounds)
		(non standard)			slang and loanwords (phonologically native sounds)
ו	[v]	ו׳	[w]	quiet	slang and loanwords (phonologically native sounds)
ד	[d]	ד׳	[ð]	there	For transliteration of sounds in foreign languages (non-native sounds, i.e. sounds foreign to Hebrew phonology).
ח	[ħ]	ח׳	[χ]	loch	For transliteration of sounds in foreign languages (non-native sounds, i.e. sounds foreign to Hebrew phonology).
ס	[s]	ס׳	[sˤ]		For transliteration of sounds in foreign languages (non-native sounds, i.e. sounds foreign to Hebrew phonology).
ע	[ʕ]	ע׳	[ɣ]		For transliteration of sounds in foreign languages (non-native sounds, i.e. sounds foreign to Hebrew phonology).
ר	[r]	ר׳	[ɣ]		For transliteration of sounds in foreign languages (non-native sounds, i.e. sounds foreign to Hebrew phonology).
ת	[t]	ת׳	[θ]	think	For transliteration of sounds in foreign languages (non-native sounds, i.e. sounds foreign to Hebrew phonology).

== Cantillation ==
Cantillation has a more limited use than vowel pointing, as it is only used for reciting the Tanakh, and is not found in children's books or dictionaries.

== Gershayim ==
Gershayim between the penultimate and last letters ( ״ e.g. פזצט״א) marks acronyms, alphabetic numerals, names of Hebrew letters, linguistic roots and, in older texts, transcriptions of foreign words. Placed above a letter (◌֞ e.g. פְּרִ֞י) it is one of the cantillation marks.

== Disputes among Protestant Christians ==
Protestant literalists who believe that the Hebrew text of the Old Testament is the inspired Word of God are divided on the question of whether or not the vowel points should be considered an inspired part of the Old Testament. In 1624, Louis Cappel, a French Huguenot scholar at Saumur, published a work in which he concluded that the vowel points were a later addition to the biblical text, added no earlier than the fifth century AD. This assertion was hotly contested by Swiss theologian Johannes Buxtorf II in 1648. Brian Walton's 1657 polyglot bible followed Cappel in revising the vowel points. In 1675, the 2nd and 3rd canons of the so-called Helvetic Consensus of the Swiss Reformed Church confirmed Buxtorf's view as orthodox and affirmed that the vowel points were inspired.

Torah scrolls in Jewish synagogues do not have any diacritical marks whatsoever, only the letters themselves. It is expected of anyone reading aloud to know the correct intonations.

== See also ==
- Arabic diacritics
- Q're perpetuum
- Hebrew alphabet
- Hebrew spelling

== Notes ==
* The rafe sign (רפה, ֿ ) which is used to mark fricative consonants in the YIVO orthography of Yiddish; is no longer used in modern printed Hebrew. Rafe may appear in masoretic manuscripts as well as other older texts where the soft fricative consonants and sometimes matres lectionis are indicated by this sign.
