= Oleksandr Yakymchuk =

Ukrainian painter

Oleksandr Stepanovych Yakymchuk
- Born: 13 September 1899; Korets, Ukraine
- Died: 1970 (aged 70–71)
- Style: Painter

Oleksandr Stepanovych Yakymchuk (13 September 1899 – 1970) was a Ukrainian painter and educator.

== Biography ==
Oleksandr Stepanovych Yakymchuk was born on 13 September 1899 in Korets. He obtained his artistic education in private studios Kyiv and in Warsaw from 1921 to 1923. In 1928, he continued his education in Italy. During 1925–1931. he was a tutor at Pochayiv Art School and the same time he headed an amateur theatre in Pochaiv affiliated with Prosvita Ukrainian society, where he played violin. Oleksa Shatkivsky is one of his most famous students

== Exhibitions ==
Yakymchuk has shown his works in the exhibitions in Warsaw (1932–1939), Lutsk (1926, 1928), Poznań (1929), Kremenets, and Lviv.

== Major works ==
- "Potato Harvest" and "Hunter" (1928)
- "Beggars in Pochaiv" (1938)
- portrait of Taras Shevchenko (1939)
- a series of watercolour landscapes of Volhynia (1940–1944)

Yakymchuk received numerous awards. His works are preserved in the Kremenets Local Lore Museum and private collections in Ukraine, Poland, and Italy.
