= Oleksa Shatkivsky =

Ukrainian painter and teacher (1908–1979)

Oleksa Yakovych Shatkivskyi
- Born: 28 May 1908; Smikh near Pochaiv, Ukraine
- Died: 28 June 1979 (aged 71); Lviv
- Style: Painter, graphic artist
- Movement: Post-Impressionism

Oleksa Yakovych Shatkivskyi (28 May 1908, in Smikh near Pochaiv – 28 June 1979 in Lviv) was a Ukrainian painter and graphic artist, originally from Pochaiv in Volhynia.

== Biography ==
From 1914, he lived in Sicheslavschyna. In 1918, he returned home and studied at the Pochaiv Icon Painting Workshop. His first teachers were Oleksandr Tsykutskyi and Oleksandr Yakymchuk (1926–1930). After that since 1931 he continued education at the Warsaw School of Applied Arts from Tadeusz Pruszkowski (received 14 awards for painting and graphics), and Academy of Fine Arts, Warsaw (class of Władysław Skoczylas and Leon Wyczółkowski). From 1931, he was a member of the Ukrainian artists' group Spokij. During his time in Europe, he visited museums in Berlin, Dresden and Paris. As a member of the Ukrainian art group Spokij, he exhibited in Warsaw, Lviv, Rivne, Lutsk, at the international student exhibition in Romania and in 1976 in Vancouver, Canada.

In 1939, he returned to Pochaiv from Warsaw and taught at the Pochaiv Secondary School while continuing his artistic work. After World War II, he worked as an artist at the Ternopil Drama Theater. His theater sketches and decorations are now kept in the Ternopil Regional State Archive. From 1946, he lived in Lviv.

Shatkivsky became a teacher at the Institute of Applied and Decorative Arts (now the Academy of Arts) in Lviv from 1948 and at the Polygraphic Institute in 1950 (now the Academy of Printing).

He exhibited his works from 1932 in Moscow, Warsaw, Lviv, Lutsk, Rivne and other cities. In the late 1950s, significant changes occurred in his painting style. Alongside his main themes – lyrical landscapes, still lifes, predominantly flowers – he turned to depicting portraits of Ukrainian cultural classics, historical figures and folk customs. In addition to his surname "Shatkivsky," he also used "Smikh-Shatkivsky", associated with the ancient Smikh family – owners of estates near Pochaiv.

Shatkivsky died in Lviv on 28 June 1979, and is buried in the Lychakiv Cemetery, plot No. 32. The gravestone was designed by Theodosia Bryzh.

In 1981, a large posthumous exhibition of his works took place in Lviv and Ternopil.

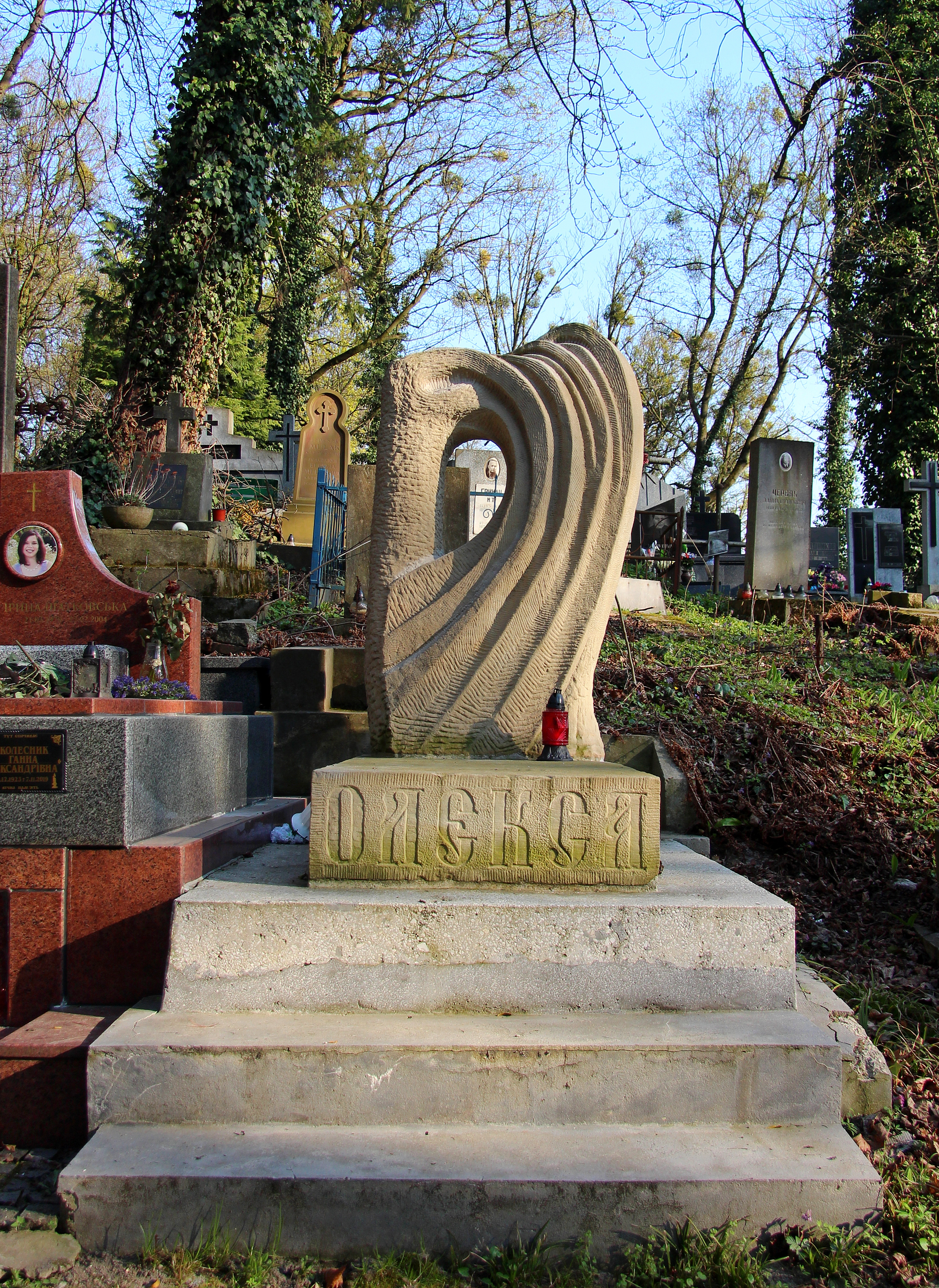
Monument on the grave of the artist O. Shatkivsky.

== Works ==
Oleksa Shatkivsky's works are housed in the Lviv and Lutsk art galleries, the National Union of Artists of Ukraine in Kyiv, the National Museum of Poland in Warsaw, and private collections.

His numerous paintings depict landscapes of Volhynia, the Carpathians, and Lviv, paintings for the 100th anniversary of Taras Shevchenko's death (1961), and many lithographs and engravings.

Shatkivsky's creativity is marked by features of impressionism and belongs to the post-impressionism movement that emerged in the 1880s. Artists of this movement sought visual impressions and aimed to convey the materiality of the world freely and abstractly, resorting to decorative stylization.

Retrospective exhibitions of Shatkivsky's works took place in Lviv in 1968, 2008 (dedicated to the centenary of his birth, at the Lviv National Museum), and in 2023 (Graphics of Oleksa Shatkivsky, LNMA, Lviv).
