= Korets Raion =

Former subdivision of Rivne Oblast, Ukraine

Korets Raion Корецький район
- Raion
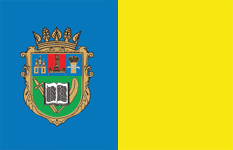
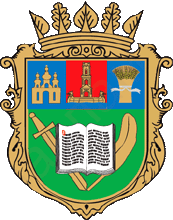
- Flag Coat of arms

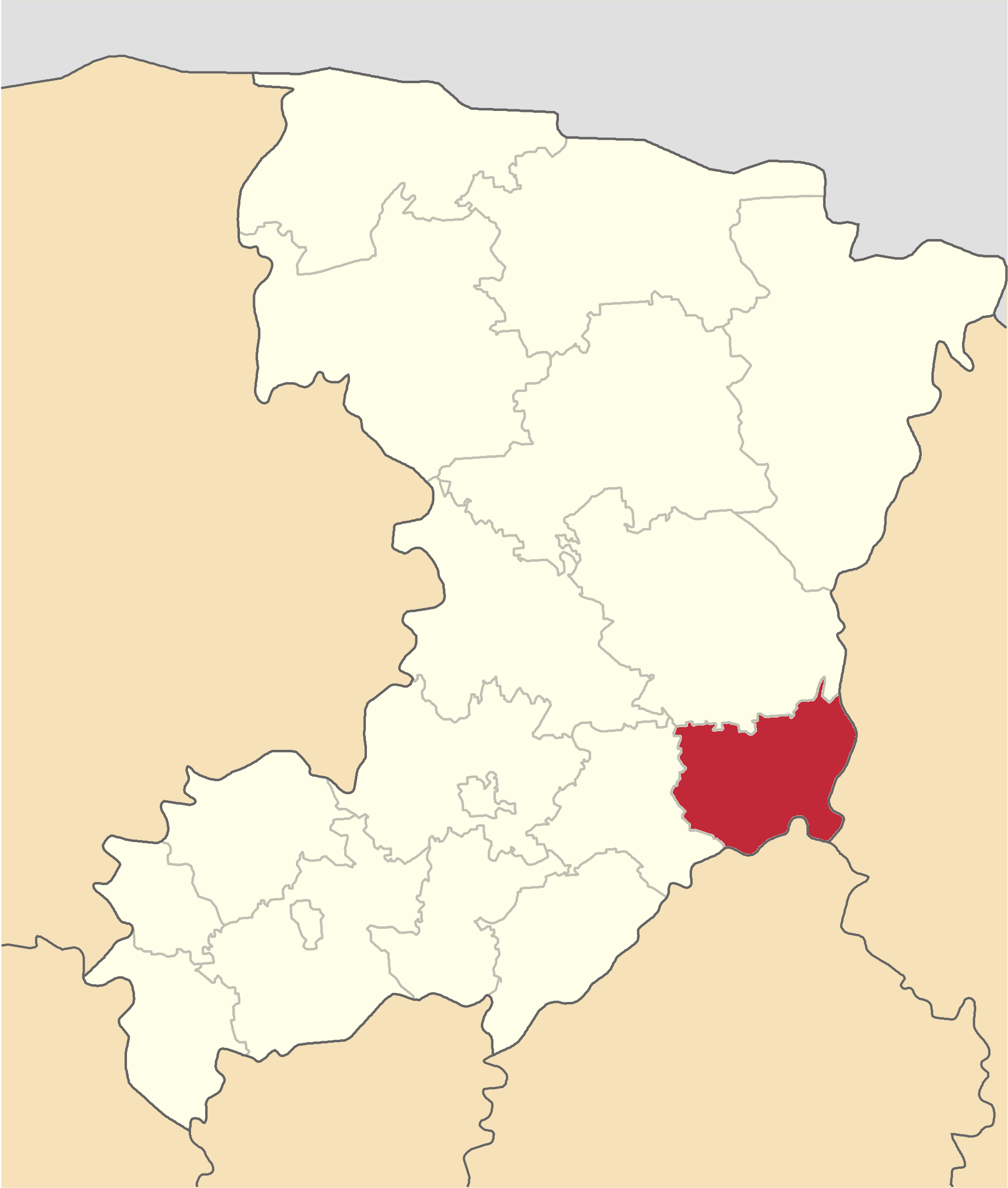
- Coordinates: 50°40′8″N 27°1′53″E
- Country: Ukraine
- Oblast: Rivne Oblast
- Established: 1940
- Disestablished: 18 July 2020
- Admin. center: Korets
- Subdivisions: List: — city councils; — settlement councils; — rural councils; Number of localities: — cities; — urban-type settlements; 49 — villages; — rural settlements

Area
  - Total: 720 km^{2} (280 sq mi)

Population (2020)
  - Total: 32,553
  - Density: 45/km^{2} (120/sq mi)
- Time zone: UTC+02:00 (EET)
  - Summer (DST): UTC+03:00 (EEST)
- Area code: 380-3651
- Website: http://www.rv.gov.ua/sitenew/koretsk Korets Raion

Korets Raion (Ukrainian: Корецький район) was a raion in Rivne Oblast in western Ukraine. Its administrative center was the town of Korets. The raion was abolished and its territory was merged into Rivne Raion on 18 July 2020 as part of the administrative reform of Ukraine, which reduced the number of raions of Rivne Oblast to four. The last estimate of the raion population was 32,553 (2020 est.)

== See also ==
- Subdivisions of Ukraine
