= Pogonowski =

Pogonowski is a Polish-language family name. Feminine form: Pogonowska. The surname may refer to:

- Iwo Cyprian Pogonowski (1921–2016), Polish-born polymath and inventor
- Stefan Pogonowski (1895–1920), (1895–1920), Polish soldier and military officer
- Maria Pogonowska (1897–2009), Polish-Israeli scientist
- Anna Pogonowska (1922–2005), Polish poet
- Emilia Pogonowska-Jucha (1939–2004), Polish lawyer and statesperson, member of parliament and State Tribunal
- Krzysztof Pogonowski (1958), Polish informatics teacher and mathematician
