= Korets Castle =

Coordinates: 50°37′03″N 27°09′23″E

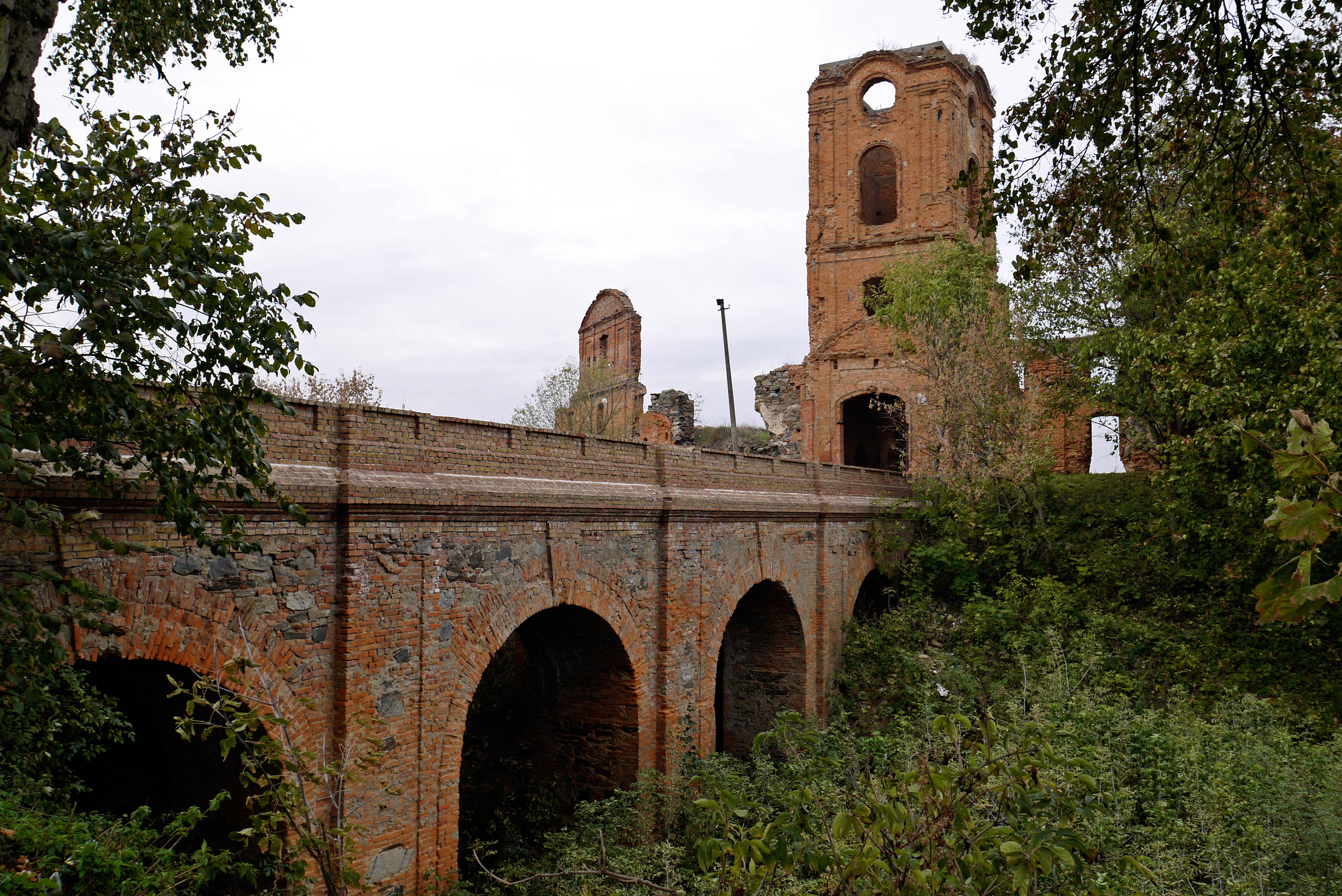
- Current view of the castle
- Interactive map of Korets Castle

Immovable Monument of National Significance of Ukraine
- Official name: Замок (Castle)
- Type: Architecture
- Reference no.: 170036

The Ruins of Korets Castle, a drawing by Napoleon Orda

The Korets Castle (Ukrainian: Корецький замок, romanized: Korets'kyi zamok) is a castle built in Korets c. 1400 by either Prince Theodor Ostrogski or Prince Dymitr Korybut. Its main tower is featured in the town's emblem.

The moated castle on the bank of the Korchyk River was the seat of the princely House of Korets between the 15th and 17th centuries. After the main princely line died out in 1651, Korets passed through inheritance to a junior line of the Czartoryski family. In 1780, Józef Klemens Czartoryski rebuilt the castle to serve as his main residence.

As Józef Klemens had no male issue, the castle was neglected after his death. It burnt down in the wake of the November Uprising in 1832. Over the years the ruins have steadily deteriorated and by the late 20th century have all but disappeared.
