= Korets =

City in Rivne Oblast, Ukraine

Korets Корець Korzec
- City
- General view of Korets

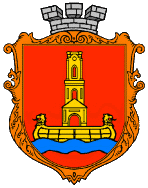
- Coat of arms

- Location within Rivne Oblast Location within Ukraine
- Coordinates: 50°37′02″N 27°10′39″E
- Country: Ukraine
- Oblast: Rivne Oblast
- Raion: Rivne Raion
- Hromada: Korets urban hromada
- First mentioned: 1150

Population (2022)
  - Total: 6,914

Korets (Ukrainian: Корець, IPA: [ˈkɔretsʲ]; Russian: Корец; Polish: Korzec; Yiddish: קאריץ Koritz) is a city in Rivne Oblast, Ukraine. The city is located on the Korchyk river, 66 kilometers to the east of Rivne. It was the administrative center of Korets Raion until the raion was abolished in 2020. Population: 6,914 (2022 estimate).

== History ==
Known since 1150 as Korchesk, Korets was fortified by Prince Theodor Ostrogski in the late 14th century. At that time, the town was part of the Grand Duchy of Lithuania.

Between the 15th and 17th centuries, the Korets Castle was the seat of the princely House of Korets that issued from Duke Narimantas of Volhynia. After the death of the last Prince Korecki in 1651, it passed through inheritance to the junior line of the House of Czartoryski and became its main seat until the line died out in the early 1800s.

Following the 1569 Union of Lublin, Korzec, as it was known in Polish, became part of the Kingdom of Poland, where it remained for over 200 years, administratively located in the Volhynian Voivodeship in the Lesser Poland Province, until the Partitions of Poland. The town then belonged to the Volhynian Governorate of the Russian Empire.

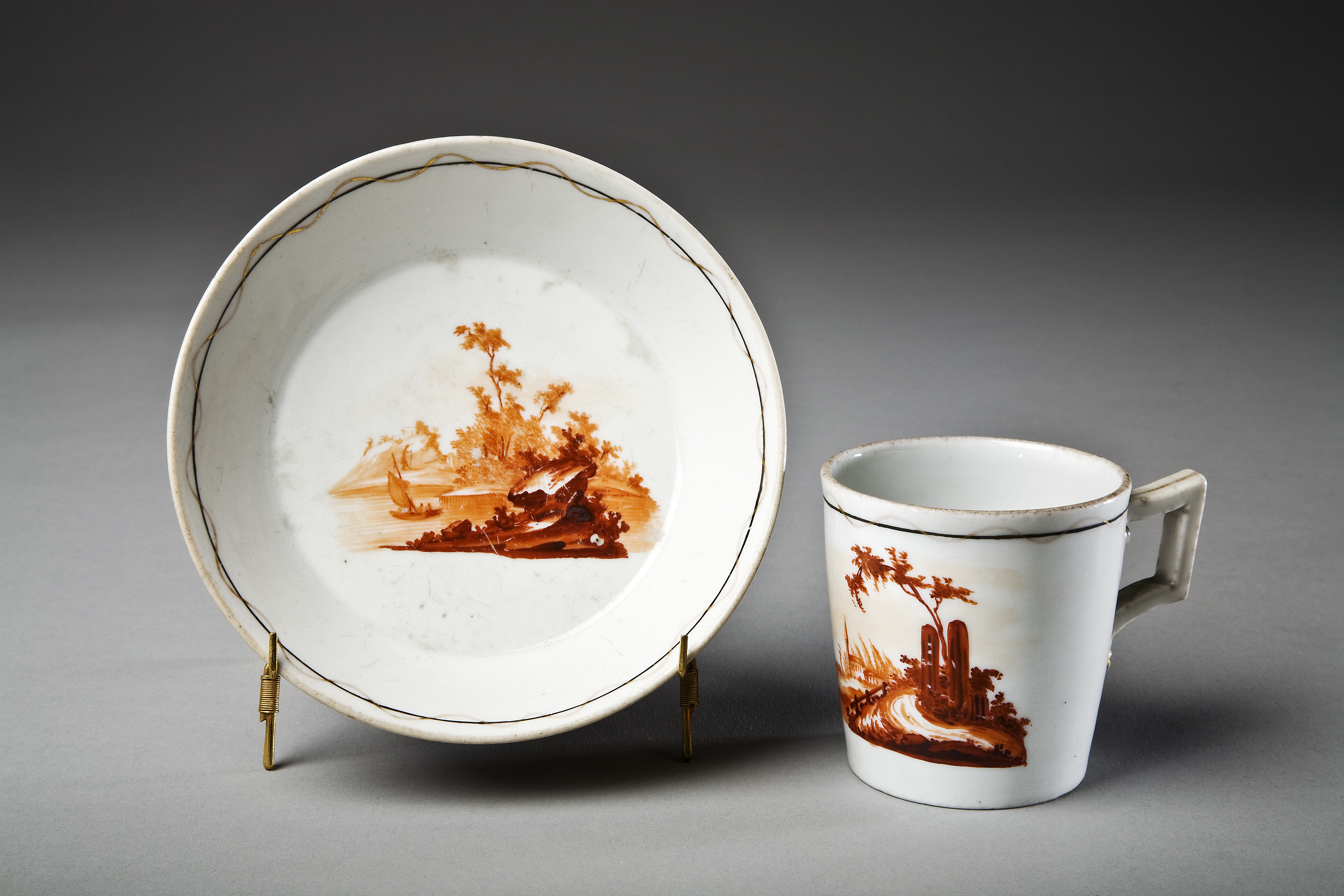
Korzec porcelain

The Korzec porcelain plant was established by Józef Klemens Czartoryski in 1783. It was managed by French brothers Francois and Michel de Mezer of Sevres. Its products were famous across Poland. The plant burned in 1797, was rebuilt in 1800, and operated until 1832. Furthermore, Prince Jozef Czartoryski opened here a manufacturer of cloth sash, popular among Polish-Lithuanian szlachta.

At the end of the 19th century, 70 to 80% of the inhabitants were Jewish.

In the Second Polish Republic, Korzec, as it was called, was part of Równe County, Volhynian Voivodeship. Most of its population was Jewish, with Polish and Ukrainian communities. In 1924, a local branch of the Polish Sokół movement was founded.

Following the joint German-Soviet invasion of Poland, which started World War II in September 1939, the town was occupied by the Soviet Union until 1941, then by Germany until 1944, and then re-occupied by the Soviet Union, which eventually annexed it from Poland in 1945. A local newspaper has been published here since June 1941.

Before World War II, 6,000 Jews lived in the town. In May 1942, 2,200 Jews were murdered and survivors were kept prisoners in a ghetto. In September 1942, 1,500 Jews were murdered in a mass execution. In the summer of 1943, local structures of the Home Army were destroyed by the Germans.

Historical population
Year	Pop.	±%
1989	9,437	—
2013	7,388	−21.7%

== Sights ==
Historical heritage of Korets includes the remains of its old castle and Resurrection Monastery, as well as the Church of St. Antony (1533, rebuilt 1706 and 1916) and Trinity Church (1620). St. Antony church was used during part of the communist time as a chemical storage facility. Upon the arrival of the catholic pater Jozef Kozlowski in 1994, this church was gradually refurbished and eventually brought back to its original form, both internally and externally. Pater Kozlowski was priest and caretaker of St. Antony church until year 2002.

== Gallery ==
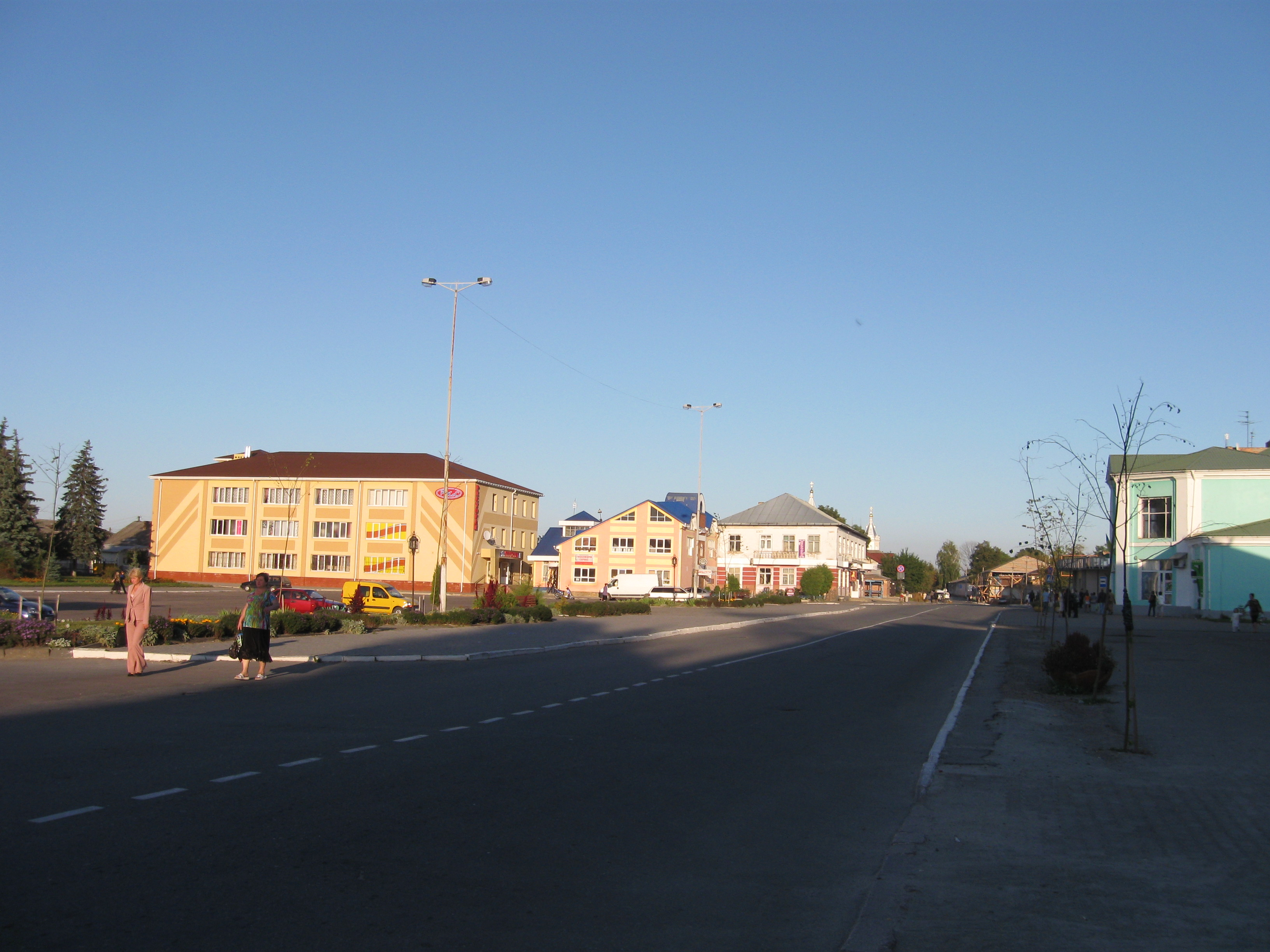
Main square of Korets

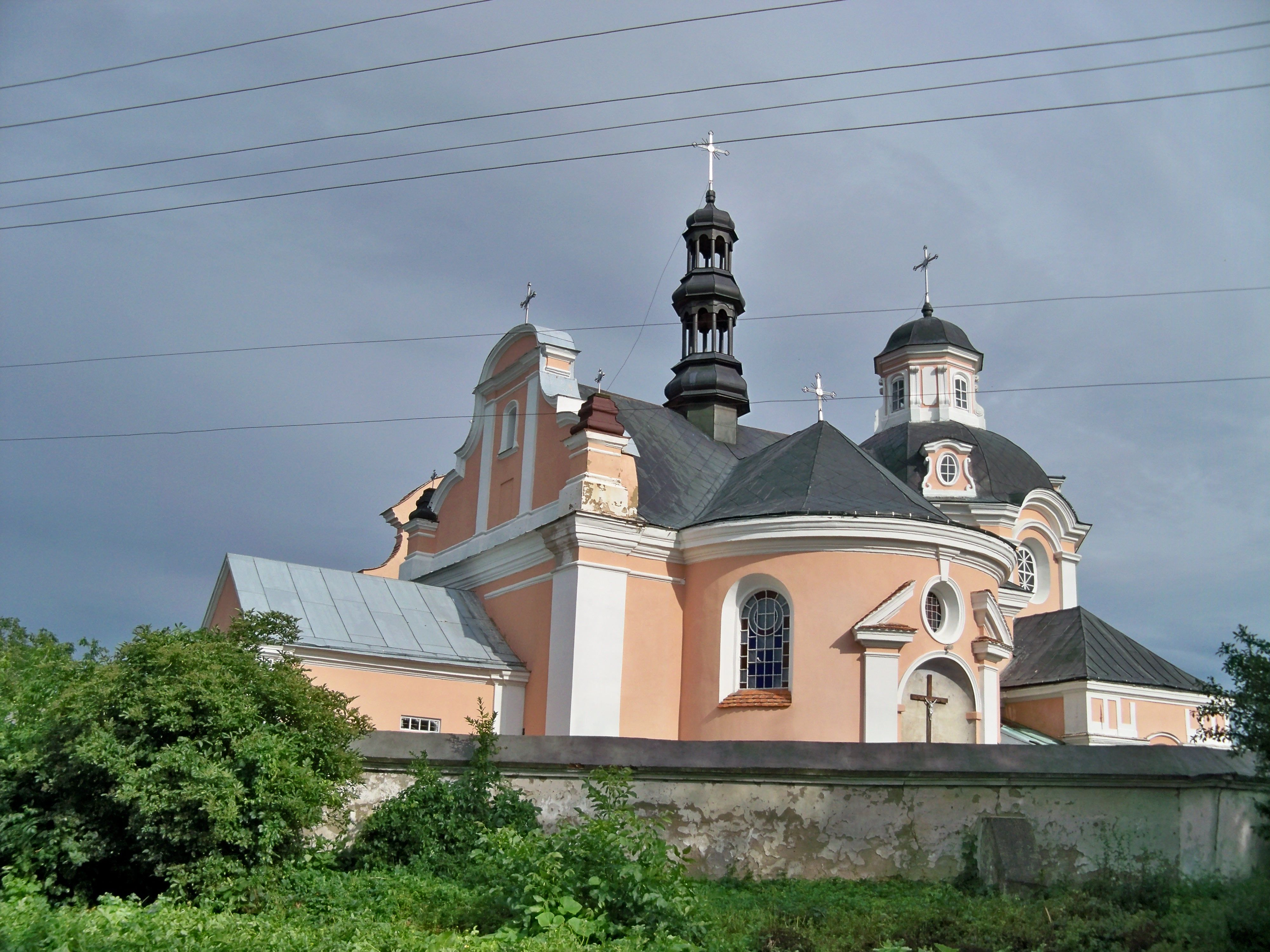
Church of St. Anthony

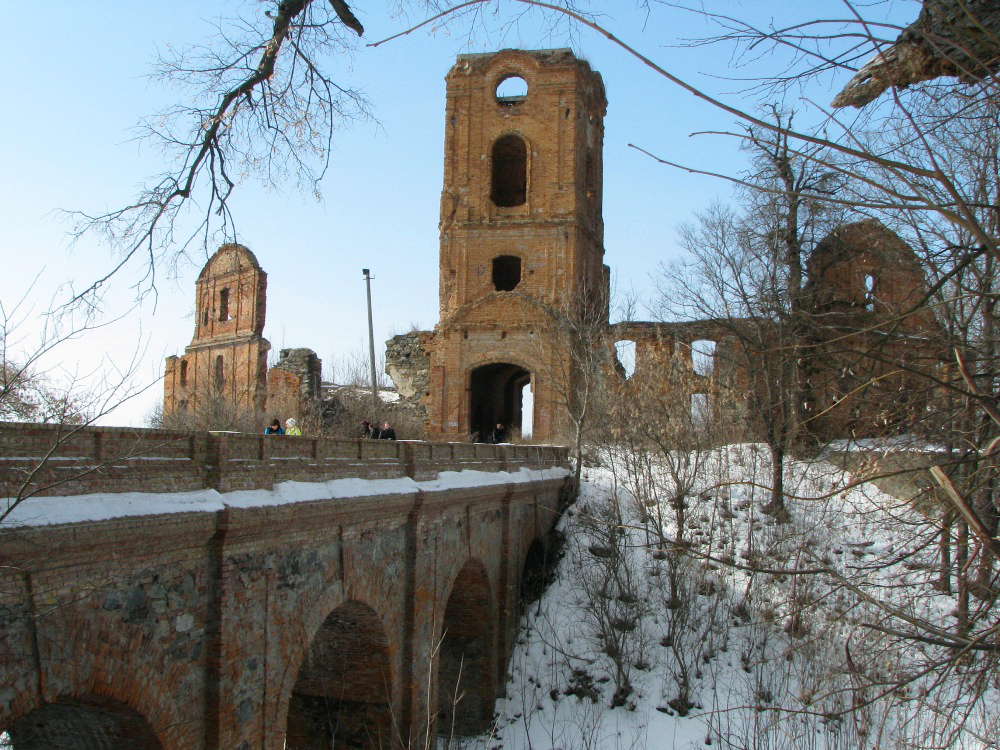
Ruins of Korets Castle

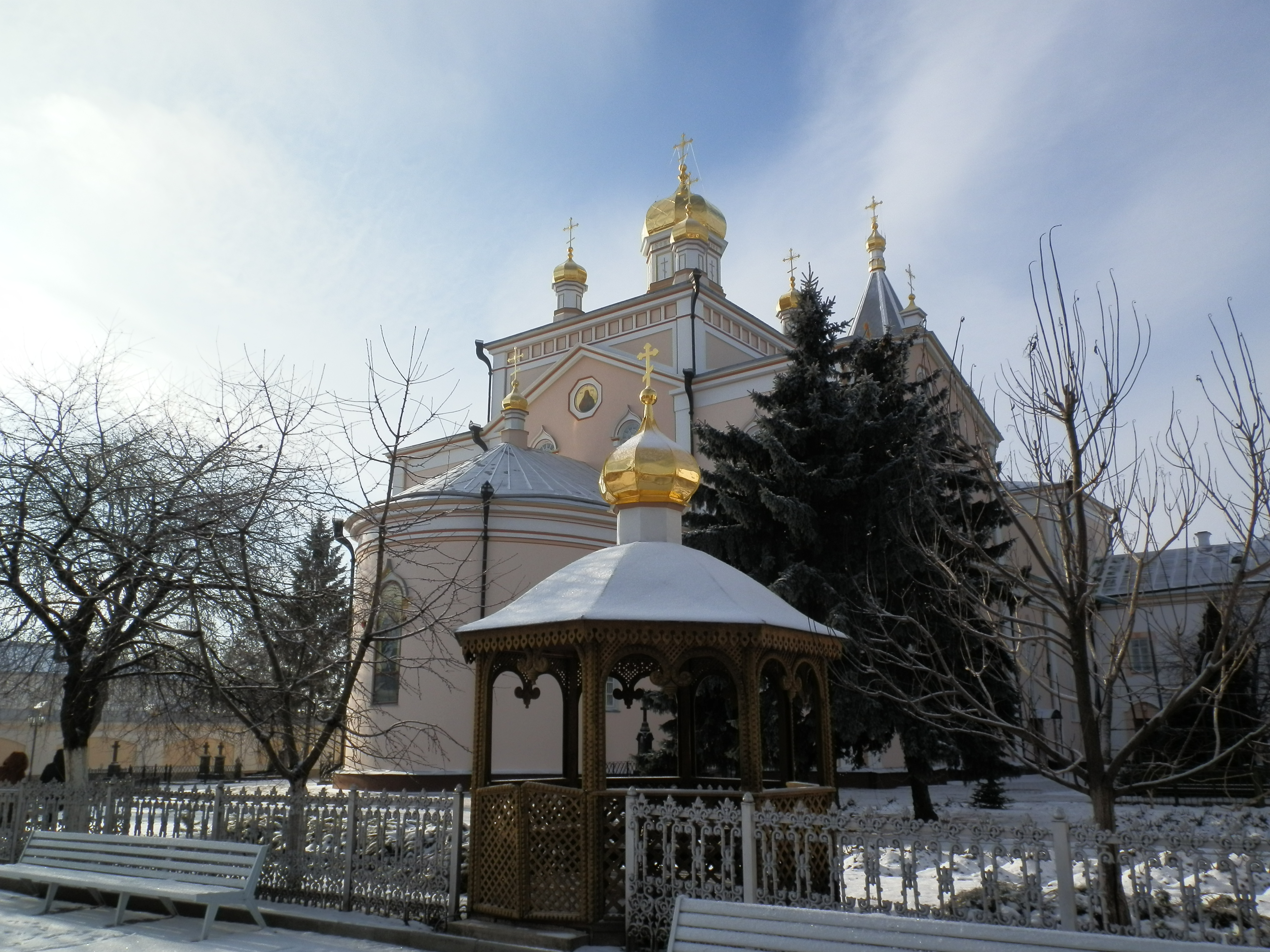
Holy Trinity Monastery

== Notable people ==
- Yaroslav Alexandrovich Evdokimov (1946–-2025), baritone, Honored Artist of the Russian Federation and People's Artist of Belarus, studied in Korets.
- Rabbi Pinchas of Koretz (1726–1791), a famous Hasidic Rebbe.
- Rabbi Asher Zebi of Ostrowo.
- Samuil Ronin, Soviet Jewish social scientist
- Oleksandr Yakymchuk
