= Scrabble letter distributions =

Frequency and point values in the board game

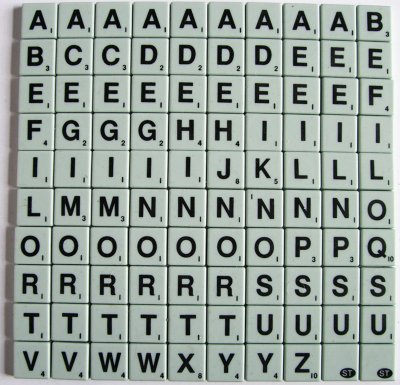
A full English-language set of Scrabble tiles

Editions of the word board game Scrabble in different languages have differing letter distributions of the tiles, because the frequency of each letter of the alphabet is different for every language. As a general rule, the rarer the letter, the more points it is worth.

Most languages use sets of 100 tiles, since the original distribution of 98 tiles was later augmented with two blank tiles. In tournament play, while it is acceptable to pause the game to count the tiles remaining in the game, it is not acceptable to mention how many tiles are remaining at any time. Several online tools exist for counting tiles during friendly play.

== Official editions ==
Scrabble editions listed in this section are officially licensed by Hasbro (for North America) or Mattel (for the rest of the world).

=== English (original) ===
English letter distribution (Point values down, number of tiles across)
	×1	×2	×3	×4	×6	×8	×9	×12
0		[blank]						
1				L S U	N R T	O	A I	E
2			G	D				
3		B C M P						
4		F H V W Y						
5	K							
8	J X							
10	Q Z							

English letter distribution (Super)
	×2	×3	×4	×5	×6	×7	×8	×10	×13	×15	×16	×24
0			[blank]									
1						L U		S	I N R	O T	A	E
2				G			D					
3			B P		C M							
4		V	F W Y	H								
5	K											
8	J X											
10	Q Z											

English-language editions of Scrabble contain 100 letter tiles, in the following distribution:

- 2 blank tiles (scoring 0 points)
- 1 point: E ×12, A ×9, I ×9, O ×8, N ×6, R ×6, T ×6, L ×4, S ×4, U ×4
- 2 points: D ×4, G ×3
- 3 points: B ×2, C ×2, M ×2, P ×2
- 4 points: F ×2, H ×2, V ×2, W ×2, Y ×2
- 5 points: K ×1
- 8 points: J ×1, X ×1
- 10 points: Q ×1, Z ×1

The total number of points is 187. Diacritical marks (such as "ñ" in words borrowed from Spanish) are ignored.

When Alfred Butts invented the game, he initially experimented with different distributions of letters. A popular story claims that Butts created an elaborate chart by studying the front page of The New York Times to create his final choice of letter distributions.

In 2004, Super Scrabble was launched. For international distribution outside the United States and Canada, and under license from Mattel, the game is manufactured by Leisure Tends' Tinderbox Games; and, for distribution within the United States and Canada, under license from Hasbro, the game is manufactured by Winning Moves. This set is composed of 200 tiles:

- 4 blank tiles (scoring 0 points)
- 1 point: E ×24, A ×16, O ×15, T̅ ×1̅5̅, I ×13, N̅ ×1̅3̅, R̅ ×1̅3̅, S̅ ×1̅0̅, L ×7, U ×7
- 2 points: D ×8, G ×5
- 3 points: C̅ ×6̅, M̅ ×6̅, B ×4, P ×4
- 4 points: H̅ ×5̅, F ×4, W ×4, Y ×4, V ×3
- 5 points: K ×2
- 8 points: J ×2, X ×2
- 10 points: Q ×2, Z ×2

Super Scrabble contains more letters that are o̅v̅e̅r̅l̅i̅n̅e̅d̅ and fewer letters that are underlined than would be obtained by combining two standard English sets.

=== Afrikaans ===
Afrikaans letter distribution
	×1	×2	×3	×4	×6	×8	×9	×16
0		[blank]						
1					D O R S T	I N	A	E
2			H L	G				
3			K W					
4		M U Y						
5		P V						
8	B F							
10	J							

The Afrikaans editions use these 102 tiles:

- 2 blank tiles (scoring 0 points)
- 1 point: E ×16, A ×9, I ×8, N ×8, D ×6, O ×6, R ×6, S ×6, T ×6
- 2 points: G ×4, H ×3, L ×3
- 3 points: K ×3, W ×3
- 4 points: M ×2, U ×2, Y ×2
- 5 points: P ×2, V ×2
- 8 points: B ×1, F ×1
- 10 points: J ×1

Afrikaans letter distribution (original)
	×1	×2	×3	×4	×5	×6	×7	×8	×9	×15
0		[blank]								
1		U		L	R	O S T	N	I	A	E
2				G		D				
3	M	B P								
4		F V W Y	H							
5			K							
8	J									

Circa 1953, the Production and Marketing Company had provided license to the private company Leon Toys of Johannesburg, South Africa in the manufacture and production of Scrabble. Alongside the English language version of Scrabble the company also produced the first Afrikaans language version of the game under the name Krabbel, an Afrikaans translation of "Scrabble". This language set of the game had the following 100 tiles:

- 2 blank tiles (scoring 0 points)
- 1 point: E ×15, A ×9, I ×8, N ×7, O ×6, S ×6, T ×6, R ×5, L ×4, U ×2
- 2 points: D ×6, G ×4
- 3 points: B ×2, P ×2, M ×1
- 4 points: H ×3, F ×2, V ×2, W ×2, Y ×2
- 5 points: K ×3
- 8 points: J ×1

Absent in both the original and standard set of Afrikaans are the letters C, Q, X, and Z. The infrequent X and Z may still be represented by the use of a blank, yet the letters C and Q, not used in Afrikaans but only in a few loanwords, may not be. Diacritical marks are ignored.

=== Arabic ===
Arabic letter distribution
	×2	×3	×4	×8
0	[blank]			
1		ﺡ ﺥ ﻡ ﻥ ﻩ ﻭ ي	ﻝ ﺝ	ﺍ
2		ﺭ ﺩ ﺱ ث	ت ﺏ	
3		ﻑ ﻕ ﺫ ﺵ ﺯ		
4	ﻁ	ﺹ ﺽ ﻉ ﻙ		
5	ﻅ			
6	ﺉ			
8	ﻍ ﺀ			
10	ﺃ ﺅ			

Arabic-language editions use the following 100 tiles:

- 2 blank tiles (scoring 0 points)
- 1 point: ﺍ ×8, ﻝ ×4, ﺝ ×4, ﺡ ×3, ﺥ ×3, ﻡ ×3, ﻥ ×3, ﻩ ×3, ﻭ ×3, ي ×3
- 2 points: ﺏ ×4, ﺕ ×4, ﺭ ×3, ﺩ ×3, ﺱ ×3, ﺙ ×3,
- 3 points: ﻑ ×3, ﻕ ×3, ﺫ ×3, ﺵ ×3, ﺯ ×3
- 4 points: ﺹ ×3, ﺽ ×3, ﻉ ×3, ﻙ ×3, ﻁ ×2,
- 5 points: ﻅ ×2
- 6 points: ﺉ ×2
- 8 points: ﻍ ×2, ﺀ ×2
- 10 points: ﺃ ×2, ﺅ ×2,

Although Arabic letters have up to four forms, Scrabble tiles use the isolated form. In some sets, as found in some Arabic-based alphabets that are not the standard modern Arabic, a dotless yeh (alif maqsura) may be used ى, and for the letter he the initial form ھ (heh doachashmee) may appear, as it is in some Arabic-based alphabets, as in Urdu, the isolated form of the letter. The pattern of using the isolated forms in composing words is also found in Arabic crosswords and in the Scrabble3D Persian Scrabble set and is one of the rare situations when Arabic letters are not connected to each other. The ligature لا is played as two individual tiles: ل and ا.

=== Bulgarian ===
Bulgarian letter distribution
	×1	×2	×3	×4	×5	×8	×9
0		[blank]					
1				Н П Р С	Т	Е И	А О
2			Б К Л	В Д М			
3		Ъ	Г				
4		Ж З					
5	Й Х	Ч Я	У				
8	Ц Ш Ю						
10	Ф Щ Ь						

Bulgarian-language Scrabble sets, which use Cyrillic letters, use the following 102 tiles:

- 2 blank tiles (scoring 0 points)
- 1 point: А ×9, О ×9, Е ×8, И ×8, Т ×5, Н ×4, П ×4, Р ×4, С ×4
- 2 points: В ×4, Д ×4, М ×4, Б ×3, К ×3, Л ×3
- 3 points: Г ×3, Ъ ×2
- 4 points: Ж ×2, З ×2
- 5 points: У ×3, Ч ×2, Я ×2, Й ×1, Х ×1
- 8 points: Ц ×1, Ш ×1, Ю ×1
- 10 points: Ф ×1, Щ ×1, Ь ×1

=== Catalan ===
Catalan letter distribution
	×1	×2	×3	×4	×5	×6	×8	×12	×13
0		[blank]							
1				L U	O T	N	I R S	A	E
2			C D M						
3		B G P							
4	F V								
8	H J Q Z								
10	Ç L·L NY X								

Catalan letter distribution (Super clone)
	×1	×2	×3	×5	×6	×7	×8	×10	×12	×16	×17	×19	×25	×27
0				[blank]										
1					U		L	O T	N	R	I	S	A	E
2				C D		M								
3			B G P											
4		F V												
8		H J QU Z												
10		NY X												
12		Ç												
15	L·L													

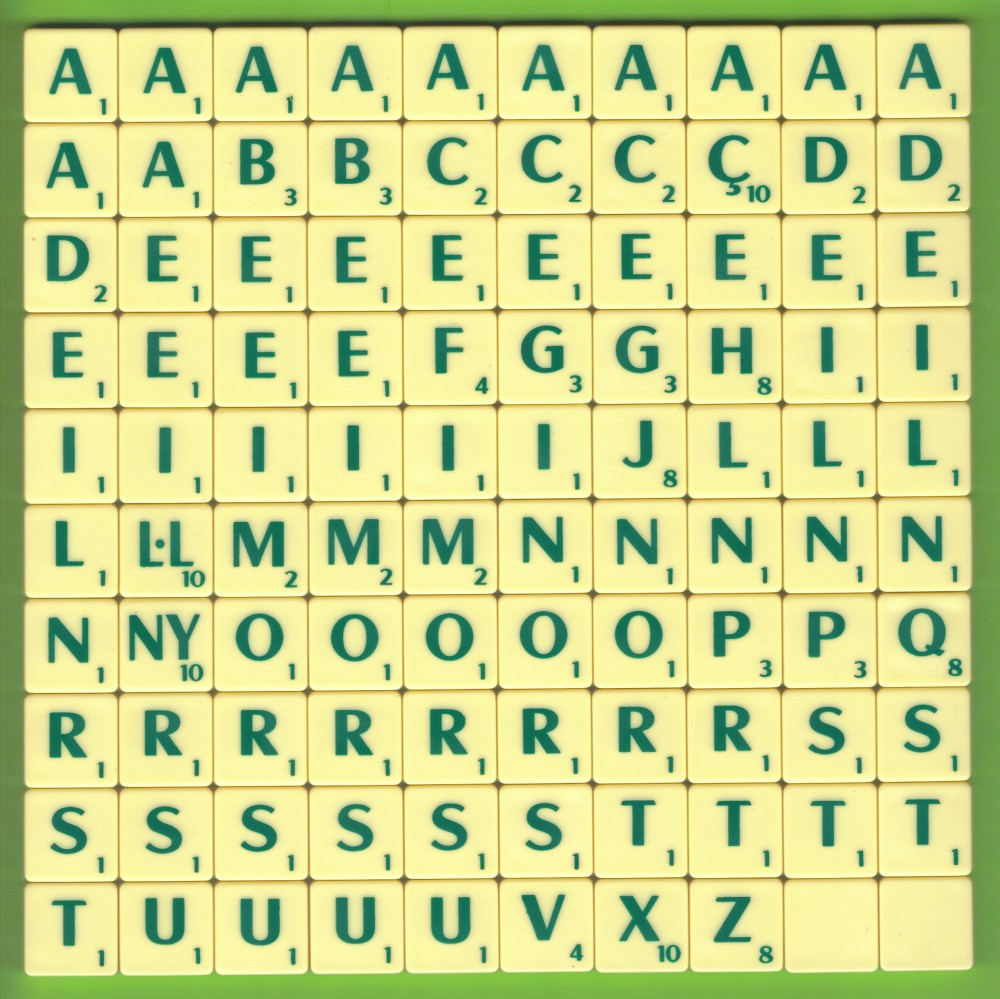
A full Catalan-language set.

Catalan-language editions use these 100 tiles:

- 2 blank tiles (scoring 0 points)
- 1 point: E ×13, A ×12, I ×8, R ×8, S ×8, N ×6, O ×5, T ×5, L ×4, U ×4
- 2 points: C ×3, D ×3, M ×3
- 3 points: B ×2, G ×2, P ×2
- 4 points: F ×1, V ×1
- 8 points: H ×1, J ×1, Q ×1, Z ×1
- 10 points: Ç ×1, L·L ×1, NY ×1, X ×1

The Catalan edition has special tiles for the C with cedilla Ç (ce trencada), the ligature L·L representing the geminated L (ela geminada), as well as the digraph NY. K, W, and Y are absent because they are only used in loanwords or, for Y, the digraph NY. Blanks cannot be used to represent K, W, or Y, which means that playing an N tile followed by a blank tile to form the digraph NY is not allowed, and loanwords containing K and W are simply not played. Official rules treat the Q tile as just one letter, but usually Catalan players use the Q tile like the QU digraph and all Catalan Scrabble Clubs use this de facto rule. While Ç is a separate tile, other diacritic marks are ignored.

There is a Catalan Scrabble clone which uses the same 21×21 board as Super Scrabble. It includes the following 200 tiles, with the Q tile replaced with the QU digraph, because Q in Catalan is never without a U after it, and with two of the special tiles, Ç and L·L, increased in value:

- 5̅ w̅i̅l̅d̅ (a̅s̅t̅e̅r̅i̅s̅k̅) t̅i̅l̅e̅s̅ s̅c̅o̅r̅i̅n̅g̅ 0̅ p̅o̅i̅n̅t̅s̅
- 1 point: E̅ ×2̅7̅, A̅ ×2̅5̅, S̅ ×1̅9̅, I̅ ×1̅7̅, R ×16, N ×12, O ×10, T ×10, L ×8, U ×6
- 2 points: M̅ ×7̅, C ×5, D ×5
- 3 points: B ×3, G ×3, P ×3
- 4 points: F ×2, V ×2
- 8 points: H ×2, J ×2, QU ×2, Z ×2
- 10 points: NY ×2, X ×2
- 12 points: Ç ×2
- 15 points: L·L ×1

=== Croatian ===
Croatian letter distribution
	×1	×2	×3	×4	×5	×6	×9	×10	×11
0		[blank]							
1				J U	R S T	N	E O	I	A
2			K M P V						
3	B Č	G L Z	D						
4	C H LJ NJ Š Ž								
5	Ć								
8	F								
10	DŽ Đ								

Croatian-language Scrabble sets use the following 103 tiles:

- 2 blank tiles (scoring 0 points)
- 1 point: A ×11, I ×10, E ×9, O ×9, N ×6, R ×5, S ×5, T ×5, J ×4, U ×4
- 2 points: K ×3, M ×3, P ×3, V ×3
- 3 points: D ×3, G ×2, L ×2, Z ×2, B ×1, Č ×1
- 4 points: C ×1, H ×1, LJ ×1, NJ ×1, Š ×1, Ž ×1
- 5 points: Ć ×1
- 8 points: F ×1
- 10 points: DŽ ×1, Đ ×1

Note that Q, W, X and Y are not included, as Croatian does not use those letters. Playing D and Ž in place of DŽ and L or N in front of J in place of LJ and NJ respectively is not allowed.

=== Czech ===
Czech letter distribution
	×1	×2	×3	×4	×5	×6
0		[blank]				
1			D K L P R	I S T V	A E N	O
2		Á J Y Z	C H Í M U			
3		B É Ě				
4	Č Ů Ž	Ř Š Ý				
5	F G Ú					
6	Ň					
7	Ó Ť					
8	Ď					
10	X					

Czech-language sets use the following 100 tiles:

- 2 blank tiles (scoring 0 points)
- 1 point: O ×6, A ×5, E ×5, N ×5, I ×4, S ×4, T ×4, V ×4, D ×3, K ×3, L ×3, P ×3, R ×3
- 2 points: C ×3, H ×3, Í ×3, M ×3, U ×3, Á ×2, J ×2, Y ×2, Z ×2
- 3 points: B ×2, É ×2, Ě ×2
- 4 points: Ř ×2, Š ×2, Ý ×2, Č ×1, Ů ×1, Ž ×1
- 5 points: F ×1, G ×1, Ú ×1
- 6 points: Ň ×1
- 7 points: Ó ×1, Ť ×1
- 8 points: Ď ×1
- 10 points: X ×1

Q and W are absent because they are only used in loanwords, though Q and W can be played with a blank. X is also used only in loanwords, but it is more frequent than Q and W, so it is included. The digraphic letter CH does not appear in this edition and is not representable by the blank (joker); CH is instead played as two distinct letters C and H.

Písmenkovka letter distribution
	×1	×2	×3	×4	×5	×6
0		[blank]				
1			N P T V Y	I K L R	E S	A O
2		Á B D Í J	M U			
3		C H Š Z				
4		Č CH Ř Ž				
5	É Ů Ý	Ě				
6	Ň Ť Ú					
8	Ď F G					
10	Ó X					

Písmenkovka letter distribution (original)
	×1	×2	×3	×4	×5	×6	×7
0		[blank]					
1			N P T V Y	I K L R	E S	A	O
2		Á B D Í J	M U				
3		C H Š Z					
4		Č CH Ř Ž					
5	É Ů Ý	Ě					
6	Ň Ť Ú						
8	Ď F G						
10	Ó						

Prior to 1993, there was no official Czech Scrabble. Instead, there was a Scrabble clone called Pismenkovka which was created in the 1970s, which had a CH tile. Pismenkovka sets contain these tiles:

- 2 blank tiles (scoring 0 points)
- 1 point: A ×6, O ×6, E ×5, S ×5, I ×4, K ×4, L ×4, R ×4, N ×3, P ×3, T ×3, V ×3, Y ×3
- 2 points: M ×3, U ×3, Á ×2, B ×2, D ×2, Í ×2, J ×2
- 3 points: C ×2, H ×2, Š ×2, Z ×2
- 4 points: Č ×2, CH ×2, Ř ×2, Ž ×2
- 5 points: Ě ×2, É ×1, Ů ×1, Ý ×1
- 6 points: Ň ×1, Ť ×1, Ú ×1
- 8 points: Ď ×1, F ×1, G ×1
- 10 points: Ó ×1, X ×1

Originally this set did not include an X tile (because it is only used in loanwords) and instead had a seventh O tile.

KrisKros Klasik has a similar distribution, but it includes 4 T tiles and 2 X tiles.

=== Danish ===
Danish letter distribution
	×1	×2	×3	×4	×5	×6	×7	×9
0		[blank]						
1						N R	A	E
2					D L O S T			
3			F G M U V	B I K				
4		H J P Y Æ Ø Å						
8	W X Z	C						

Danish-language Scrabble sets use these 101 tiles:

- 2 blank tiles (scoring 0 points)
- 1 point: E ×9, A ×7, N ×6, R ×6
- 2 points: D ×5, L ×5, O ×5, S ×5, T ×5
- 3 points: B ×4, I ×4, K ×4, F ×3, G ×3, M ×3, U ×3, V ×3
- 4 points: H ×2, J ×2, P ×2, Y ×2, Æ ×2, Ø ×2, Å ×2
- 8 points: C ×2, W x1, X ×1, Z ×1

The distribution lacks Q, which is very rare and only occurs in foreign words. C, W, X, and Z also only occur in foreign words, but they are not so rare, so they were included. Q can be played with a blank. Prior to 2025, sets contained 100 tiles and did not include a W.

=== Dutch ===
Dutch letter distribution #1
	×1	×2	×3	×4	×5	×6	×10	×18
0		[blank]						
1				I		A O	N	E
2					D R S T			
3		B P	G K L M					
4		F H J V Z	U					
5		C W						
8	X Y							
10	Q							

Dutch letter distribution #1 (old)
	×1	×2	×3	×4	×5	×6	×10	×18
0		[blank]						
1				I		A O	N	E
2				S	D R T			
3		B P	G K L M					
4	F	H IJ J V Z	U					
5		C W						
8	X Y							
10	Q							

Dutch letter distribution #2
	×1	×2	×3	×4	×5	×6	×8	×16
0		[blank]						
1				I		A O	N	E
2					D R S T			
3		B G	K L M P					
4		F H J V IJ Z		U				
5		C W						
8	X							
10	Q							

Dutch letter distribution #3 (original)
	×1	×2	×3	×4	×5	×6	×10	×18
0		[blank]						
1			S		D	A I O R T	N	E
2			H L	G				
3		B C M P						
4		J K U V W						
5	F							
6		Z						
8	X Y							
10	Q							

Dutch-language editions consist of the following 102 tiles:

- 2 blank tiles (scoring 0 points)
- 1 point: E ×18, N ×10, A ×6, O ×6, I ×4
- 2 points: D ×5, R ×5, S ×5, T ×5
- 3 points: G ×3, K ×3, L ×3, M ×3, B ×2, P ×2
- 4 points: U ×3, F ×2, H ×2, J ×2, V ×2, Z ×2
- 5 points: C ×2, W ×2
- 8 points: X ×1, Y ×1
- 10 points: Q ×1

Before March 1998, there was a difference between the Dutch and the Flemish version: the Dutch version had 2 Ĳ tiles with a value of 4 points. Furthermore, it had only 1 F and only 4 S tiles. The Flemish version never had Ĳ tiles; it was as described above. The Dutch version is now in line with the Flemish one. Instead of the IJ letter a combination of the I and J is now used.

Another Dutch version before March 1998 consisted of these 100 tiles and did not contain the rarely used letter Y:

- 2 blank tiles (scoring 0 points)
- 1 point: E ×16, N ×8, A ×6, O ×6, I ×4
- 2 points: D ×5, R ×5, S ×5, T ×5
- 3 points: K ×3, L ×3, M ×3, P ×3, B ×2, G ×2
- 4 points: U ×4, F ×2, H ×2, J ×2, V ×2, IJ ×2, Z ×2
- 5 points: C ×2, W ×2
- 8 points: X ×1
- 10 points: Q ×1

The original Dutch version consisted of these 102 tiles:

- 2 blank tiles (scoring 0 points)
- 1 point: E ×18, N ×10, A ×6, I ×6, O ×6, R ×6, T ×6, D ×5, S ×3
- 2 points: G ×4, H ×3, L ×3
- 3 points: B ×2, C ×2, M ×2, P ×2
- 4 points: J ×2, K ×2, U ×2, V ×2, W ×2
- 5 points: F ×1
- 6 points: Z ×2
- 8 points: X ×1, Y ×1
- 10 points: Q ×1

=== Estonian ===
Estonian letter distribution
	×1	×2	×4	×5	×7	×8	×9	×10
0		[blank]						
1				K L O U	T	S	E I	A
2		R	D M N					
3		G V						
4	B	H J P Õ						
5		Ä Ü						
6		Ö						
8	F							
10	Š Z Ž							

Estonian-language editions consist of the following 102 tiles:

- 2 blank tiles (scoring 0 points)
- 1 point: A ×10, E ×9, I ×9, S ×8, T ×7, K ×5, L ×5, O ×5, U ×5
- 2 point: D ×4, M ×4, N ×4, R ×2
- 3 point: G ×2, V ×2
- 4 point: H ×2, J ×2, P ×2, Õ ×2, B ×1
- 5 point: Ä ×2, Ü ×2
- 6 point: Ö ×2
- 8 point: F ×1
- 10 point: Š ×1, Z ×1, Ž ×1

C, Q, W, X and Y are absent because these letters are only used in foreign words and are not an official part of the alphabet.

=== Faroese ===
Faroese letter distribution
	×1	×2	×3	×4	×5	×7	×10
0		[blank]					
1					S U	E N R T	A I
2				Ð G K L V			
3			M				
4		D F H O					
5	Á						
6	B Í J Ó Ú						
7	Ø Y						
8	P Ý Æ						

Faroese letter distribution (unofficial)
	×1	×2	×3	×4	×5	×6	×7	×8	×10	×11
0			[blank]							
1					S U	E	T	N R	I	A
2				G K L M V						
3		F H	Ð O							
4		B D								
5	Í J P Y									
6	Á Ó Ø									
8	Æ Ú									
10	Ý									

Faroese-language editions, created in 2010 as "Krossorðaspæl", consist of the following 102 tiles:

- 2 blank tiles (scoring 0 points)
- 1 point: A ×10, I ×10, E ×7, N ×7, R ×7, T ×7, S ×5, U ×5
- 2 points: Ð ×4, G ×4, K ×4, L ×4, V ×4
- 3 points: M ×3
- 4 points: D ×2, F ×2, H ×2, O ×2
- 5 points: Á ×1
- 6 points: B ×1, Í ×1, J ×1, Ó ×1, Ú ×1
- 7 points: Y ×1, Ø ×1
- 8 points: P ×1, Ý ×1, Æ ×1

An earlier, unofficial, Faroese-language edition consisted of the following 106 tiles:

- 2 blank tiles (scoring 0 points)
- 1 point: A ×11, I ×10, N ×8, R ×8, T ×7, E ×6, S ×5, U ×5
- 2 points: G ×4, K ×4, L ×4, M ×4, V ×4
- 3 points: Ð ×3, O ×3, F ×2, H ×2
- 4 points: B ×2, D ×2
- 5 points: Í ×1, J ×1, P ×1, Y ×1
- 6 points: Á ×1, Ó ×1, Ø ×1
- 8 points: Æ ×1, Ú ×1
- 10 points: Ý ×1

C, Q, W, X, and Z are absent since these letters are not used in modern standard Faroese.

=== Finnish ===
Finnish letter distribution
	×1	×2	×3	×4	×5	×7	×8	×9	×10
0		[blank]							
1						S	E	N T	A I
2					K L O Ä				
3			M	U					
4		H J P R V Y							
7	D Ö								
8	B F G W								
10	C								

Finnish-language sets use these 101 tiles:

- 2 blank tiles (scoring 0 points)
- 1 point: A ×10, I ×10, N ×9, T ×9, E ×8, S ×7
- 2 points: K ×5, L ×5, O ×5, Ä ×5
- 3 points: U ×4, M ×3
- 4 points: H ×2, J ×2, P ×2, R ×2, V ×2, Y ×2
- 7 points: D ×1, Ö ×1
- 8 points: B ×1, F ×1, G ×1, W ×1
- 10 points: C ×1

This distribution lacks Q, Š, X, Z, Ž, and Å, since they are virtually absent in Finnish. W was not originally present in the distribution, but it was added by 2019. Arguably B, C, F, G (outside the digraph NG), and W do not exist in Finnish either, but they are included as they are used for borrowed words, and F in some western dialects.

Finnish letter distribution (before 2019)
	×1	×2	×3	×4	×5	×7	×8	×9	×10
0		[blank]							
1						S	E	N T	A I
2					K L O Ä				
3			M	U					
4		H J P R V Y							
7	D Ö								
8	B F G								
10	C								

Before 2019, a distribution without the W and with 100 tiles was used:

- 2 blank tiles (scoring 0 points)
- 1 point: A ×10, I ×10, N ×9, T ×9, E ×8, S ×7
- 2 points: K ×5, L ×5, O ×5, Ä ×5
- 3 points: U ×4, M ×3
- 4 points: H ×2, J ×2, P ×2, R ×2, V ×2, Y ×2
- 7 points: D ×1, Ö ×1
- 8 points: B ×1, F ×1, G ×1
- 10 points: C ×1

A variant called Alfapet (originally the name of Swedish Scrabble), contains 108 tiles:

Finnish letter distribution (Alfapet)
	×1	×2	×3	×4	×5	×6	×7	×8	×9
0		[blank]							
1						K L O	E S	N	A I T
2				P R V	M U Ä				
3			H J Y						
4	G	D Ö							
6	B F								
8	C								

- 2 blank tiles (scoring 0 points), 2 black tiles (scoring 0 points), 2 left-pointing arrows, 2 right-pointing arrows
- 1 point: A ×9, I ×9, T ×9, N ×8, E ×7, S ×7, K ×6, L ×6, O ×6
- 2 points: M ×5, U ×5, Ä ×5, P ×4, R ×4, V ×4
- 3 points: H ×3, J ×3, Y ×3
- 4 points: D ×2, Ö ×2, G ×1
- 6 points: B ×1, F ×1
- 8 points: C ×1

The old Alfapet distribution was as follows:

Finnish letter distribution (old Alfapet)
	×1	×2	×3	×4	×5	×6	×7	×8	×10
0		[blank]							
1						Ä	E S	I N	A T
2				M	D K L O R U				
3			B G						
4		F H J P V Ö							
8		C Y							

- 2 blank tiles (scoring 0 points), 2 black tiles (scoring 0 points), 2 left-pointing arrows, 2 right-pointing arrows
- 1 point: A ×10, T ×10, I ×8, N ×8, E ×7, S ×7, Ä ×6
- 2 points: D ×5, K ×5, L ×5, O ×5, R ×5, U ×5, M ×4
- 3 points: B ×3, G ×3
- 4 points: F ×2, H ×2, J ×2, P ×2, V ×2, Ö ×2
- 8 points: C ×2, Y ×2

=== French ===
French letter distribution
	×1	×2	×3	×5	×6	×8	×9	×15
0		[blank]						
1				L	N O R S T U	I	A	E
2		G	D M					
3		B C P						
4		F H V						
8	J Q							
10	K W X Y Z							

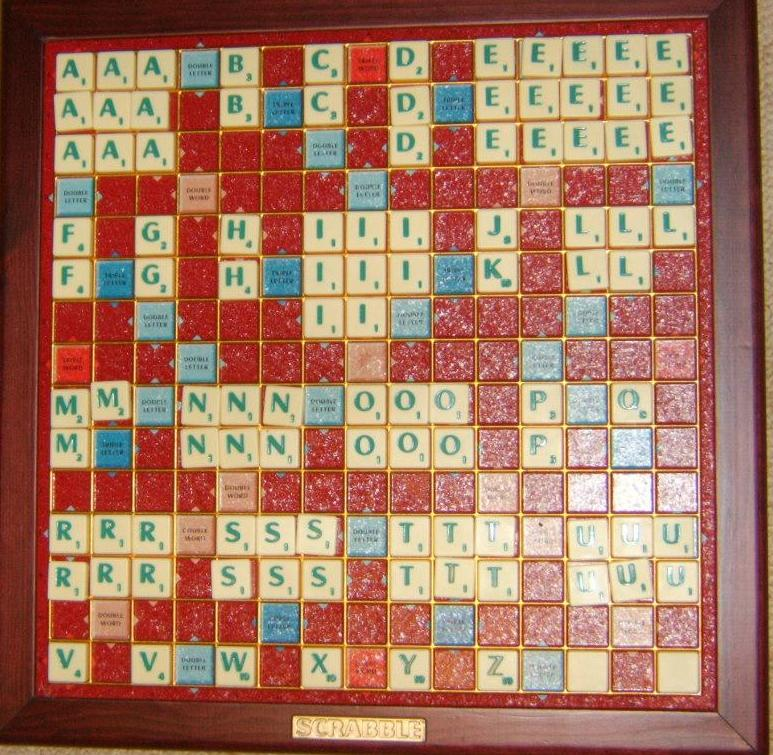
A complete French Scrabble set

French-language editions of Scrabble contain these 102 tiles:

- 2 blank tiles (scoring 0 points)
- 1 point: E ×15, A ×9, I ×8, N ×6, O ×6, R ×6, S ×6, T ×6, U ×6, L ×5
- 2 points: D ×3, M ×3, G ×2
- 3 points: B ×2, C ×2, P ×2
- 4 points: F ×2, H ×2, V ×2
- 8 points: J ×1, Q ×1
- 10 points: K ×1, W ×1, X ×1, Y ×1, Z ×1

Diacritical marks are ignored.

=== German ===
German letter distribution
	×1	×2	×3	×4	×5	×6	×7	×9	×15
0		[blank]							
1				D	A	I R T U	S	N	E
2			G L O	H					
3	W Z	B		M					
4	P	C F K							
6	Ä J Ü V								
8	Ö X								
10	Q Y								

German letter distribution (former)
	×1	×2	×3	×4	×5	×6	×7	×8	×9	×10	×16
0		[blank]									
1						A D U	R	S	I	N	E
2		W	G	C L O	H T						
3		B K Z	F	M							
4	P V										
5	Ü										
6	Ä J										
8	Ö X										
10	Q Y										

German letter distribution (Selchow & Righter)
	×1	×2	×3	×4	×5	×6	×7	×8	×12
0		[blank]							
1			O U		R T	A S	N	I	E
2	Ä Ö Ü		G L	C D H					
3		B F K P	M						
4		V W	Z						
8	J								
10	Q X Y								

German letter distribution (original)
	×1	×2	×3	×4	×6	×8	×14
0		[blank]					
1			O U		A R S T	I N	E
2	Ä Ö Ü		G L	D			
3		B C F K P	H M				
4		V W					
8	J Y Z						
10	Q X						

German letter distribution (Super)
	×2	×4	×6	×8	×10	×11	x12	×14	×17	×29
0		[blank]								
1				D	A	I R	T U	S	N	E
2			G L O	H						
3	W Z	B		M						
4	P	C F K								
6	Ä J Ü V									
8	Ö X									
10	Q Y									

German-language editions of Scrabble contain 102 letter tiles, in the following distribution:

- 2 blank tiles (scoring 0 points)
- 1 point: E ×15, N ×9, S ×7, I ×6, R ×6, T ×6, U ×6, A ×5, D ×4
- 2 points: H ×4, G ×3, L ×3, O ×3
- 3 points: M ×4, B ×2, W ×1, Z ×1
- 4 points: C ×2, F ×2, K ×2, P ×1
- 6 points: Ä ×1, J ×1, Ü ×1, V ×1
- 8 points: Ö ×1, X ×1
- 10 points: Q ×1, Y ×1

Before the current 102-tile set, German language sets had 119 tiles. With the larger sized tile pool, players had eight tiles at a time on their racks, as opposed to the standard seven. The letter distribution for this larger set is:

- 2 blank tiles (scoring 0 points)
- 1 point: E ×16, N ×10, I ×9, S ×8, R ×7, A ×6, D ×6, U ×6
- 2 points: H ×5, T ×5, C ×4, L ×4, O ×4, G ×3, W ×2
- 3 points: M ×4, F ×3, B ×2, K ×2, Z ×2
- 4 points: P ×1, V ×1
- 5 points: Ü ×1
- 6 points: Ä ×1, J ×1
- 8 points: Ö ×1, X ×1
- 10 points: Q ×1, Y ×1

German sets marketed as Foreign Language Editions produced by Selchow & Righter had 100 tiles with the following distribution:

- 2 blank tiles (scoring 0 points)
- 1 point: E ×12, I ×8, N ×7, A ×6, S ×6, R ×5, T ×5, O ×3, U ×3
- 2 points: C ×4, D ×4, H ×4, G ×3, L ×3, Ä ×1, Ö ×1, Ü ×1
- 3 points: M ×3, B ×2, F ×2, K ×2, P ×2
- 4 points: Z ×3, V ×2, W ×2
- 8 points: J ×1
- 10 points: Q ×1, X ×1, Y ×1

In the mid-1950s, licensed by James Brunot's Production and Marketing Company, the wooden-toy company J. Schowanek KG. of Piding (Bavaria), Germany produced the earliest German-language edition with a different 100-tile distribution:

- 2 blank tiles (scoring 0 points)
- 1 point: E ×14, I ×8, N ×8, A ×6, R ×6, S ×6, T ×6, O ×3, U ×3
- 2 points: D ×4, G ×3, L ×3, Ä ×1, Ö ×1, Ü ×1
- 3 points: H ×3, M ×3, B ×2, C ×2, F ×2, K ×2, P ×2
- 4 points: V ×2, W ×2
- 8 points: J ×1, Y ×1, Z ×1
- 10 points: Q ×1, X ×1

In 2008, a German edition of the Mattel-licensed product, Super Scrabble, was released by the game publisher Piatnik. The set is composed of the following 200 tiles:

- 4 blank tiles (scoring 0 points)
- 1 point: E ×29, N ×17, S ×14, I ×11, R ×11, T ×12, U ×12, A ×10, D ×8
- 2 points: H ×8, G ×6, L ×6, O ×6
- 3 points: M ×8, B ×4, W ×2, Z ×2
- 4 points: C ×4, F ×4, K ×4, P ×2
- 6 points: Ä ×2, J ×2, Ü ×2, V ×2
- 8 points: Ö ×2, X ×2
- 10 points: Q ×2, Y ×2

The underlines indicate the distribution contains one tile fewer for the letter than would be if the 102 tiles of the current language set were simply doubled.

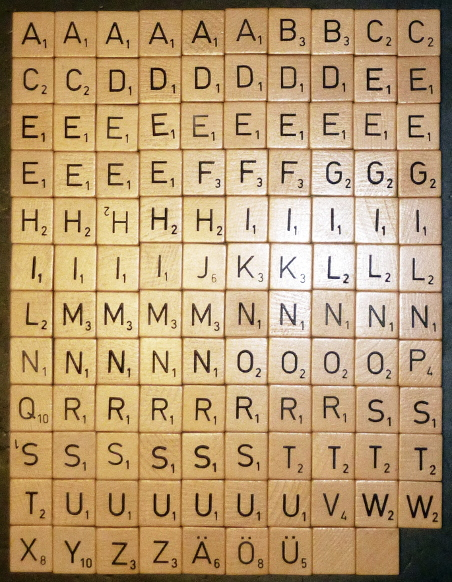
Complete Set of old German Scrabble Tiles

Note that the quasi-letter ß (Eszett) is not used in any official distribution. This is because its capital version did not exist officially in standard German orthography prior to 2017 and the letter itself is unused in Switzerland and Liechtenstein. Instead, the character is substituted by SS. However, the umlauts Ä, Ö and Ü must not be replaced by AE, OE or UE when playing (as would usually be done in German crosswords where ß is also replaced by SS). Other diacritics, which may occur in some foreign words, are ignored (é = E, œ = OE etc.).

=== Greek ===
Greek letter distribution
	×1	×2	×3	×4	×5	×6	×7	×8	×9	×12
0		[blank]								
1						Ν	Η Σ	Ε Ι Τ	Ο	Α
2				Κ Π Υ	Ρ					
3			Λ Μ Ω							
4		Γ Δ								
8	Β Φ Χ									
10	Ζ Θ Ξ Ψ									

Greek-language editions of Scrabble contain 104 tiles:

- 2 blank tiles (scoring 0 points)
- 1 point: Α ×12, Ο ×9, Ε ×8, Ι ×8, Τ ×8, Η ×7, Σ ×7, Ν ×6
- 2 points: Ρ ×5, Κ ×4, Π ×4, Υ ×4
- 3 points: Λ ×3, Μ ×3, Ω ×3
- 4 points: Γ ×2, Δ ×2
- 8 points: Β ×1, Φ ×1, Χ ×1
- 10 points: Ζ ×1, Θ ×1, Ξ ×1, Ψ ×1

=== Hebrew ===
Hebrew letter distribution #4
	×1	×2	×3	×4	×6	×8	×9	×10	×12
0		[blank]							
1						ה ת ר		י	ו
2					א ל מ ש				
3				ב ד					
4			נ פ						
5		כ ק	ח						
8	ג ז ט ס צ	ע							

Four different Hebrew language distributions were published by the owners or licensees of the Scrabble brand. In these sets the final form letters ך, ם, ן, ף and ץ are not available and the normal form is used.

The most recent edition for Hebrew was published in 2008 by J. W. Spear & Sons, a subsidiary of Mattel UK with 100 tiles in the following distribution:

- 2 blank tiles (scoring 0 points)
- 1 point: ו ×12, י ×10, ה ×8, ת ×8, ר ×8
- 2 points: א ×6, ל ×6, מ ×6, ש ×6
- 3 points: ב ×4, ד ×4
- 4 points: נ ×3, פ ×3
- 5 points: ח ×3, כ ×2, ק ×2
- 8 points: ע ×2, ג ×1, ז ×1, ט ×1, ס ×1, צ ×1

Hebrew letter distribution #3
	×1	×2	×3	×4	×6	×8	×9	×10	×12
0		[blank]							
1						ה ר	ת	י	ו
2					א ל מ ש				
3				ב ד נ					
4			ח פ ק						
5		ע כ ג							
8	ז ט ס	צ							

A version produced in the late 1980s by J. W. Spear & Sons under the Spears Games label has these 104 tiles:

- 2 blank tiles (scoring 0 points)
- 1 point: ו ×12, י ×10, ת ×9, ה ×8, ר ×8
- 2 points: א ×6, ל ×6, מ ×6, ש ×6
- 3 points: ב ×4, ד ×4, נ ×4
- 4 points: ח ×3, פ ×3, ק ×3
- 5 points: ע ×2, כ ×2, ג ×2
- 8 points: צ ×2, ז ×1, ט ×1, ס ×1

Hebrew letter distribution #2
	×1	×2	×3	×4	×6	×8	×9	×10	×12
0		[blank]							
1						ת ר	ה	י	ו
2					ל מ ש				
3			א	ב ד					
4			נ פ						
5		ח כ ע ק							
8	ג ז ט ס צ								

In 1977 J. W. Spear & Sons published their original 97-tile Hebrew language version under the tradename נא-שבץ™ (Hebrew: "Scrabble"):

- 2 blank tiles (scoring 0 points)
- 1 point: ו ×12, י ×10, ה ×9, ת ×8, ר ×8
- 2 points: ל ×6, מ ×6, ש ×6
- 3 points: ב ×4, ד ×4, א ×3
- 4 points: נ ×3, פ ×3
- 5 points: ח ×2, כ ×2, ע ×2, ק ×2
- 8 points: ג ×1, ז ×1, ט ×1, ס ×1, צ ×1

Hebrew letter distribution #1
	×1	×2	×3	×4	×6	×8	×9	×10	×12
0		[blank]							
1						ה ר	ת	י	ו
2					ל מ ש				
3				א ב ד					
4			נ פ						
5		ח כ ע ק							
8	ג ז ט ס צ								

Just two years earlier, in 1975, Selchow & Righter released their Foreign Language Edition of Hebrew with the following 98-tile distribution:

- 2 blank tiles (scoring 0 points)
- 1 point: ו ×12, י ×10, ת ×9, ה ×8, ר ×8
- 2 points:, ל ×6, מ ×6, ש ×6
- 3 points: א ×4, ב ×4, ד ×4
- 4 points: נ ×3, פ ×3
- 5 points: ח ×2, כ ×2, ע ×2, ק ×2
- 8 points: ג ×1, ז ×1, ט ×1, ס ×1, צ ×1

=== Hungarian ===
Hungarian letter distribution
	×1	×2	×3	×4	×5	×6
0		[blank]				
1			I M O S	Á L N R	T	A E K
2			B D G Ó			
3		H SZ V	É			
4		F GY J Ö P U Ü Z				
5	C Í NY					
7	CS Ő Ú Ű					
8	LY ZS					
10	TY					

Hungarian-language sets use these 100 tiles:

- 2 blank tiles (scoring 0 points)
- 1 point: A ×6, E ×6, K ×6, T ×5, Á ×4, L ×4, N ×4, R ×4, I ×3, M ×3, O ×3, S ×3
- 2 points: B ×3, D ×3, G ×3, Ó ×3
- 3 points: É ×3, H ×2, SZ ×2, V ×2
- 4 points: F ×2, GY ×2, J ×2, Ö ×2, P ×2, U ×2, Ü ×2, Z ×2
- 5 points: C ×1, Í ×1, NY ×1
- 7 points: CS ×1, Ő ×1, Ú ×1, Ű ×1
- 8 points: LY ×1, ZS ×1
- 10 points: TY ×1

DZ and DZS, which are fairly rare in Hungarian, have no tiles, nor do Q, W, X and Y (outside the digraphs "GY", "LY", "NY" and "TY"), which are only used in loanwords, as part of the extended Hungarian alphabet. Players can still use a blank as a Q, W, X or Y, but not as DZ or DZS. Using a D tile and a Z tile to make DZ or putting together D, Z and S or D and ZS to make DZS is not allowed, meaning words with these two letters are simply not playable. Using a blank (as Y) in front of G, L, N or T to make GY, LY, NY or TY is also not allowed.

=== Icelandic ===
Icelandic letter distribution
	×1	×2	×3	×4	×5	×6	×7	×8	×10
0		[blank]							
1					T	E S U	I	N R	A
2				Ð G L					
3			F K	M					
4		Á D H Í O V							
5	Þ								
6	B J Ó Y Æ								
8	É P Ú Ö								
9	Ý								
10	X								

In 2016, Tinderbox games under license from Mattel produced Icelandic-language sets using these 104 tiles:

- 2 blank tiles (scoring 0 points)
- 1 point: A ×10, N ×8, R ×8, I ×7, E ×6, S ×6, U ×6, T ×5
- 2 points: Ð ×4, G ×4, L ×4
- 3 points: M ×4, F ×3, K ×3
- 4 points: Á ×2, D ×2, H ×2, Í ×2, O ×2, V ×2
- 5 points: Þ ×1
- 6 points: B ×1, J ×1, Ó ×1, Y ×1, Æ ×1
- 8 points: É ×1, P ×1, Ú ×1, Ö ×1
- 9 points: Ý ×1
- 10 points: X ×1

Icelandic letter distribution (Krafla)
	×1	×2	×3	×4	×5	×6	×7	×8	×11
0		[blank]							
1							I N S	R	A
2			M	Ð K	L	T U			
3		Á Ó	E F G						
4	H Í Ú	Æ							
5	B D O P V Ý								
6	J Y Ö								
7	É Þ								
10	X								

Earlier in 2016, to address a realized need for an improved letter distribution for the Icelandic-language, sets under the name Krafla, independent of the Scrabble brand, were produced and made available. From that year, this version has been sanctioned by Iceland's Scrabble clubs for their tournaments and for the national championship. Netskrafl (meaning "Net Scrabble"), a popular online crossword game website, supports the Krafla distribution. Krafla has the following 100 tiles:

- 2 blank tiles (scoring 0 points)
- 1 point: A ×11, R ×8, I ×7, N ×7, S ×7
- 2 points: T ×6, U ×6, L ×5, Ð ×4, K ×4, M ×3
- 3 points: E ×3, F ×3, G ×3, Á ×2, Ó ×2
- 4 points: Æ ×2, H ×1, Í ×1, Ú ×1
- 5 points: B ×1, D ×1, O ×1, P ×1, V ×1, Ý ×1
- 6 points: J ×1, Y ×1, Ö ×1
- 7 points: É ×1, Þ ×1
- 10 points: X ×1

Icelandic letter distribution (before 2016)
	×1	×2	×3	×4	×5	×6	×7	×8	×10
0		[blank]							
1					T	E S U	R	I N	A
2			K L M	G	Ð				
3		H V	F O						
4	Þ	Á D Í							
5	J Æ								
6	B É Ó								
7	Y Ö								
8	P Ú								
9	Ý								
10	X								

Before 2016, Icelandic-language sets used these 104 tiles:

- 2 blank tiles (scoring 0 points)
- 1 point: A ×10, I ×8, N ×8, R ×7, E ×6, S ×6, U ×6, T ×5
- 2 points: Ð ×5, G ×4, K ×3, L ×3, M ×3
- 3 points: F ×3, O ×3, H ×2, V ×2
- 4 points: Á ×2, D ×2, Í ×2, Þ ×1
- 5 points: J ×1, Æ ×1
- 6 points: B ×1, É ×1, Ó ×1
- 7 points: Y ×1, Ö ×1
- 8 points: P ×1, Ú ×1
- 9 points: Ý ×1
- 10 points: X ×1

Icelandic letter distribution (original)
	×1	×2	×3	×4	×5	×6	×7	×8	×10
0		[blank]							
1					T	S U	E R	I N	A
2			K L M	G	Ð				
3		H V	F O						
4	Þ	Á D Í							
5	J Æ								
6	B É Ó								
7	Y Ö								
8	P Ú								
9	Ý								
10	X								

Originally, there were 105 tiles in this set, as there were 7 E's instead of 6.

C, Q and W are absent in all distributions since Icelandic does not use those letters. Z is also absent in all sets due to having been obsolete since the 1970s.

=== Indonesian ===
Indonesian letter distribution
	×1	×2	×3	×4	×5	×8	×9	×19
0		[blank]						
1			O S	R	T U	E I	N	A
2			K M					
3			G	D				
4		H P	L					
5	F V	Y		B				
8	W		C					
10	J Z							

Indonesian-language sets use these 100 tiles:

- 2 blank tiles (scoring 0 points)
- 1 point: A ×19, N ×9, E ×8, I ×8, T ×5, U ×5, R ×4, O ×3, S ×3
- 2 points: K ×3, M ×3
- 3 points: D ×4, G ×3
- 4 points: L ×3, H ×2, P ×2
- 5 points: B ×4, Y ×2, F ×1, V ×1
- 8 points: C ×3, W ×1
- 10 points: J ×1, Z ×1

Q, and X, are absent because they are only present in loanwords and are very rare. F, V, and Z are also present only in loanwords, but they are not very rare, so they are included.

=== Irish ===
Irish letter distribution
	×1	×2	×3	×4	×6	×7	×10	×13
0		[blank]						
1					E S	N R	H I	A
2			G U	C D L O T				
4		Á F Í M						
8	É Ó Ú							
10	B P							

Irish-language sets, created in 2010, use these 100 tiles:

- 2 blank tiles (scoring 0 points)
- 1 point: A ×13, H ×10, I ×10, N ×7, R ×7, E ×6, S ×6
- 2 points: C ×4, D ×4, L ×4, O ×4, T ×4, G ×3, U ×3
- 4 points: Á ×2, F ×2, Í ×2, M ×2
- 8 points: É ×1, Ó ×1, Ú ×1
- 10 points: B ×1, P ×1

J, K, Q, V, W, X, Y, and Z are absent since they do not belong to the standard Irish alphabet, although they are sometimes used in loanwords.

Irish letter distribution (Scrabble3D) (original)
	×1	×2	×3	×4	×5	×6	×10	×13
0		[blank]						
1				Í S T	E L O	N R	I	A
2		G	C Ċ D M	Á				
3	Ṫ	F Ó						
4	Ḃ Ḋ É Ṁ Ú	U						
5	B Ġ							
8	P Ṡ							
10	Ḟ Ṗ							

An alternate set, proposed by Scrabble3D along with the official set, was proposed to have these 100 tiles:

- 2 blank tiles (scoring 0 points)
- 1 point: A ×13, I ×10, N ×6, R ×6, E ×5, L ×5, O ×5, Í ×4, S ×4, T ×4
- 2 points: Á ×4, C ×3, Ċ ×3, D ×3, M ×3, G ×2
- 3 points: F ×2, Ó ×2, Ṫ ×1
- 4 points: U ×2, Ḃ ×1, Ḋ ×1, É ×1, Ġ ×1, Ú ×1
- 5 points: B ×1, Ṁ ×1
- 8 points: P ×1, Ṡ ×1
- 10 points: Ḟ ×1, Ṗ ×1

Note that H is not in this set because it is only used at the beginning of the words starting with vowels, which is against the rules there. Note: This set uses the old orthography. In the new orthography, the dotted letters are replaced by the digraph of the letter without the dot followed by H.

Irish letter distribution (Scrabble3D)
	×1	×2	×3	×4	×5	×8	×11
0		[blank]					
1				E O S	Á Í L N R	I	A
2			C Ċ D G M Ó T Ú				
3		B Ḃ É Ṫ U					
4	Ḋ F Ġ						
5	Ṁ						
8	P Ṡ						
10	Ḟ Ṗ						

Shortly after, the Scrabble3D distribution underwent a major revision (still has 100 tiles):

- 2 blank tiles (scoring 0 points)
- 1 point: A ×11, I ×8, Á ×5, Í ×5, L ×5, N ×5, R ×5, E ×4, O ×4, S ×4
- 2 points: C ×3, Ċ ×3, D ×3, G ×3, M ×3, Ó ×3, T ×3, Ú ×3
- 3 points: B ×2, Ḃ ×2, É ×2, Ṫ ×2, U ×2
- 4 points: Ḋ ×1, F ×1, Ġ ×1
- 5 points: Ṁ ×1
- 8 points: P ×1, Ṡ ×1
- 10 points: Ḟ ×1, Ṗ ×1

Note that H is not in this set because it is only used at the beginning of the words starting with vowels, which is against the rules there. Note: This set uses the old orthography. In the new orthography, the dotted letters are replaced by the digraph of the letter without the dot followed by H.

=== Italian ===
Italian letter distribution
	×1	×2	×3	×5	×6	×11	×12	×14	×15
0		[blank]							
1						E	I	A	O
2					C R S T				
3				L M N U					
5			B D F P V						
8		G H Z							
10	Q								

Scalaparola letter distribution
	×1	×2	×3	×4	×5	×6	×13
0		[blank]					
1							A E I O
2						N R S T	
3					L M U		
4				C V			
5			B D G P				
8		F H Z					
10	Q						

Scarabeo letter distribution
	×2	×4	×6	×7	×12
0	[blank]				
1				C R S T	A E I O
2			L M N		
3		P			
4		B D F G U V			
8	H Z				
10	Q				

Selchow & Righter letter distribution
	×2	×3	×4	×5	×6	×7	×10
0	[blank]						
1							A E I O R S T
2					L	C N	
3			D P	M			
4			B F G U V				
8	H	Z					
10	Q						

Italian-language Scrabble applied a special rule that when a player exchanges tiles on their turn, they could request opponent to pass his turn. Both players have one chance each for one game. The sets consist of these 120 tiles:

- 2 blank tiles (scoring 0 points)
- 1 point: O ×15, A ×14, I ×12, E ×11
- 2 points: C ×6, R ×6, S ×6, T ×6
- 3 points: L ×5, M ×5, N ×5, U ×5
- 5 points: B ×3, D ×3, F ×3, P ×3, V ×3
- 8 points: G ×2, H ×2, Z ×2
- 10 points: Q ×1

Diacritic marks are ignored. The letters J, K, W, X, and Y are absent since these letters do not exist in the standard Italian alphabet, although they are sometimes used in loanwords. However, you can still use a blank to represent these five absent letters.

Prior to the 1980s, Italian scrabble was called "Scalaparola", and the sets included these 120 tiles:

- 2 blank tiles (scoring 0 points)
- 1 point: A ×13, E ×13, I ×13, O ×13
- 2 points: N ×6, R ×6, S ×6, T ×6
- 3 points: L ×5, M ×5, U ×5
- 4 points: C ×4, V ×4
- 5 points: B ×3, D ×3, G ×3, P ×3
- 8 points: F ×2, H ×2, Z ×2
- 10 points: Q ×1

Scarabeo is an Italian variant of Scrabble that is much more popular in its native country than the original game. It is played with a 17×17 board, and uses these 130 tiles:

- 2 scarab tiles (wildcards) scoring 0 points
- 1 point: A ×12, E ×12, I ×12, O ×12, C ×7, R ×7, S ×7, T ×7
- 2 points: L ×6, M ×6, N ×6
- 3 points: P ×4
- 4 points: B ×4, D ×4, F ×4, G ×4, U ×4, V ×4
- 8 points: H ×2, Z ×2
- 10 points: Q ×2

In 1948, Selchow & Righter released their Foreign Language Edition of Italian with the following 120-tile distribution:

- 2 blank tiles (scoring 0 points)
- 1 point: A ×10, E ×10, I ×10, O ×10, R ×7, S ×7, T ×7
- 2 points: C ×6, N ×6, L ×5
- 3 points: M ×5, D ×4, P ×4
- 4 points: B ×4, F ×4, G ×4, U ×4, V ×4
- 8 points: Z ×3, H ×2
- 10 points: Q ×2

By 1976, the distribution was changed to match Scalaparola.

=== Latin ===
Latin letter distribution (Cambridge)
	×1	×2	×3	×4	×5	×6	×7	×8	×9	×11
0		[blank]								
1						N	T U	S	A R	E I
2				C	M O					
3			D							
4		L P								
5		B V								
6	F G X									
10	H Q									

Latin letter distribution (Toronto)
	×1	×2	×3	×4	×5	×7	×8	×9	×12
0			[blank]						
1					O	R	S T	A I V	E
2			D L	C M N					
3			Q						
4		B G P X							
8	F H								

Latin letter distribution extension (Toronto)
	×1	×2	×3	×4	×5	×7	×8	×9	×12
0				[blank]					
1					O	R	S T	A I V	E
2	Ē Ī œ; ıı ııı	Ę	D L	C M N					
3	Ↄ ſt V̄	&	Q						
4		B G P X							
5	ct Ꝑ Ꝝ								
6	Ꝓ P̄								
8	F H								
10	Y								

Latin letter distribution (Curculio)
	×0	×1	×2	×3	×4	×5	×6	×7	×8	×9	×10	×12
0			[blank]									
1				L		M O	N R	S	T	A	V	E I
2				D P								
3			B		C							
4		F G H	Q									
8		X										
10	Y (when used for blank)											
15	Z (when used for blank)											
20	K (when used for blank)											

Latin letter distribution (Mahoney & Rydberg-Cox)
	×1	×2	×4	×6	×9	×10
0		[blank]				
1					A I S T U	E
2				M N O R		
3			C D L P			
8		B F G H Q				
10	X Y					

There are four kinds of Latin-language Scrabble sets developed by four authorities in the language.

The official distribution was made "in conjunction with scholars from the University of Cambridge and elsewhere, together with the Cambridge Schools Classics Project." This distribution distinguishes U from V, with the semi-vocalic V scoring five times the points.

- 2 blank tiles (scoring 0 points)
- 1 point: E ×11, I ×11, A ×9, R ×9, S ×8, T ×7, U ×7, N ×6
- 2 points: M ×5, O ×5, C ×4
- 3 points: D ×3
- 4 points: L ×2, P ×2
- 5 points: B ×2, V ×2
- 6 points: F ×1, G ×1, X ×1
- 10 points: H ×1, Q ×1

The second distribution, developed by the Centre for Medieval Studies of the University of Toronto, uses these 100 tiles:

- 2 blank tiles (scoring 0 points)
- 1 point: E ×12, A ×9, I ×9, V ×9, S ×8, T ×8, R ×7, O ×5
- 2 points: C ×4, M ×4, N ×4, D ×3, L ×3
- 3 points: Q ×3
- 4 points: B ×2, G ×2, P ×2, X ×2
- 8 points: F ×1, H ×1

An extension of the second distribution for Latin Paleography, developed by the Centre for Medieval Studies of the University of Toronto, uses these 120 tiles:

- 3 blank tiles (scoring 0 points)
- 1 point: E ×12, A ×9, I ×9, V ×9, S ×8, T ×8, R ×7, O ×5
- 2 points: C ×4, M ×4, N ×4, D ×3, L ×3, Ę ×2, Ē ×1, Ī ×1, œ ×1, ; ×1, ıı ×1, ııı ×1
- 3 points: Q ×3, & ×2, Ↄ ×1, ſt ×1, V̄ ×1
- 4 points: B ×2, G ×2, P ×2, X ×2
- 5 points: ct ×1, Ꝑ ×1, Ꝝ ×1
- 6 points: Ꝓ ×1, P̄ ×1
- 8 points: F ×1, H ×1
- 10 points: Y ×1

The point value of Ↄ is unknown, but it is believed to be 3. Ↄ, which represents con, can only be played as the first tile of a word. Ꝝ, which represents rum, and ;, which represents is or us, can only be played as the last tile of a word. Ę (e caudata), also written as æ, represents ae. Ē represents em or en. & represents et. Ī represents im or in. œ represents oe. Ꝑ represents per, P̄ represents prae. Ꝓ represents pro. V̄ represents vm or vn (as there was no U at the time). Note that W, unlike Ę/æ and œ, which were created at the same time, has no tile because there is no vv digraph in Latin. ıı represents 2 minims: ii, v, or n. ııı represents 3 minims: iii, iv, in, vi, ni, or m.

The third distribution is as follows:

- 2 blank tiles (scoring 0 points)
- 1 point: E ×12, I ×12, V ×10, A ×9, T ×8, S ×7, N ×6, R ×6, M ×5, O ×5, L ×3
- 2 points: D ×3, P ×3
- 3 points: C ×4, B ×2
- 4 points: Q ×2, F ×1, G ×1, H ×1
- 8 points: X ×1

However, with this set, according to the rules, if a blank is used as a Y it is worth 10 points, if a blank is used as a Z it is worth 15 points, and if a blank is used as a K it is worth 20 points. Each of those letters are so high in points, because they are used only in borrowed words. The score of 20 for a K is the highest known point value for any letter in any Scrabble score distribution worldwide.

The fourth distribution, which uses U instead of V, and includes Y, is as follows:

- 2 blank tiles (scoring 0 points)
- 1 point: E ×10, A ×9, I ×9, S ×9, T ×9, U ×9
- 2 points: M ×6, N ×6, O ×6, R ×6
- 3 points: C ×4, D ×4, L ×4, P ×4
- 8 points: B ×2, F ×2, G ×2, H ×2, Q ×2
- 10 points: X ×1, Y ×1

Y is absent in all sets except the paleographic extension of the first set and the fourth set because it is rare in Latin. K and Z are absent in all sets because they are rare in Latin, while J is not considered separate from I in all sets except the third one, in which it is not included because it is rare in Latin. W is also absent in all sets because it did not exist in ancient times, and is used only in modern borrowed words.

=== Latvian ===
Latvian letter distribution
	×1	×2	×3	×4	×5	×6	×8	×9	×11
0		[blank]							
1					R U	E T	S	I	A
2			L P	Ā K M N					
3		Z	D O V						
4		Ē Ī J							
5	B C G								
6	Ņ Š Ū								
8	Ļ Ž								
10	Č F Ģ H Ķ								

Latvian-language sets use these 104 tiles:

- 2 blank tiles (scoring 0 points)
- 1 point: A ×11, I ×9, S ×8, E ×6, T ×6, R ×5, U ×5
- 2 points: Ā ×4, K ×4, M ×4, N ×4, L ×3, P ×3
- 3 points: D ×3, O ×3, V ×3, Z ×2
- 4 points: Ē ×2, Ī ×2, J ×2
- 5 points: B ×1, C ×1, G ×1
- 6 points: Ņ ×1, Š ×1, Ū ×1
- 8 points: Ļ ×1, Ž ×1
- 10 points: Č ×1, F ×1, Ģ ×1, H ×1, Ķ ×1

Q, W, and X are absent because they are not used in modern Latvian. Y is absent because it is only used in certain dialects of Latvian. F and H are present only in loanwords, but are considered part of standard Latvian, so they are included.

=== Lithuanian ===
Lithuanian letter distribution
	×1	×2	×3	×4	×5	×6	×8	×12	×13
0		[blank]							
1				K U	E N R	O T	S	A	I
2	B		D L M						
3			P						
4		Ė G J V							
5	Š Y								
6	Ų Ž								
8	Ą Č Į Ū								
10	C Ę F H Z								

Lithuanian-language sets use these 104 tiles:

- 2 blank tiles (scoring 0 points)
- 1 point: I ×13, A ×12, S ×8, O ×6, T ×6, E ×5, N ×5, R ×5, K ×4, U ×4
- 2 points: D ×3, L ×3, M ×3, B ×1
- 3 points: P ×3
- 4 points: Ė ×2, G ×2, J ×2, V ×2
- 5 points: Š ×1, Y ×1
- 6 points: Ų ×1, Ž ×1
- 8 points: Ą ×1, Č ×1, Į ×1, Ū ×1
- 10 points: C ×1, Ę ×1, F ×1, H ×1, Z ×1

The letters Q, W and X are absent, because they are not used in Lithuanian. F and H are present only in loanwords, but are considered part of standard Lithuanian, so they are included.

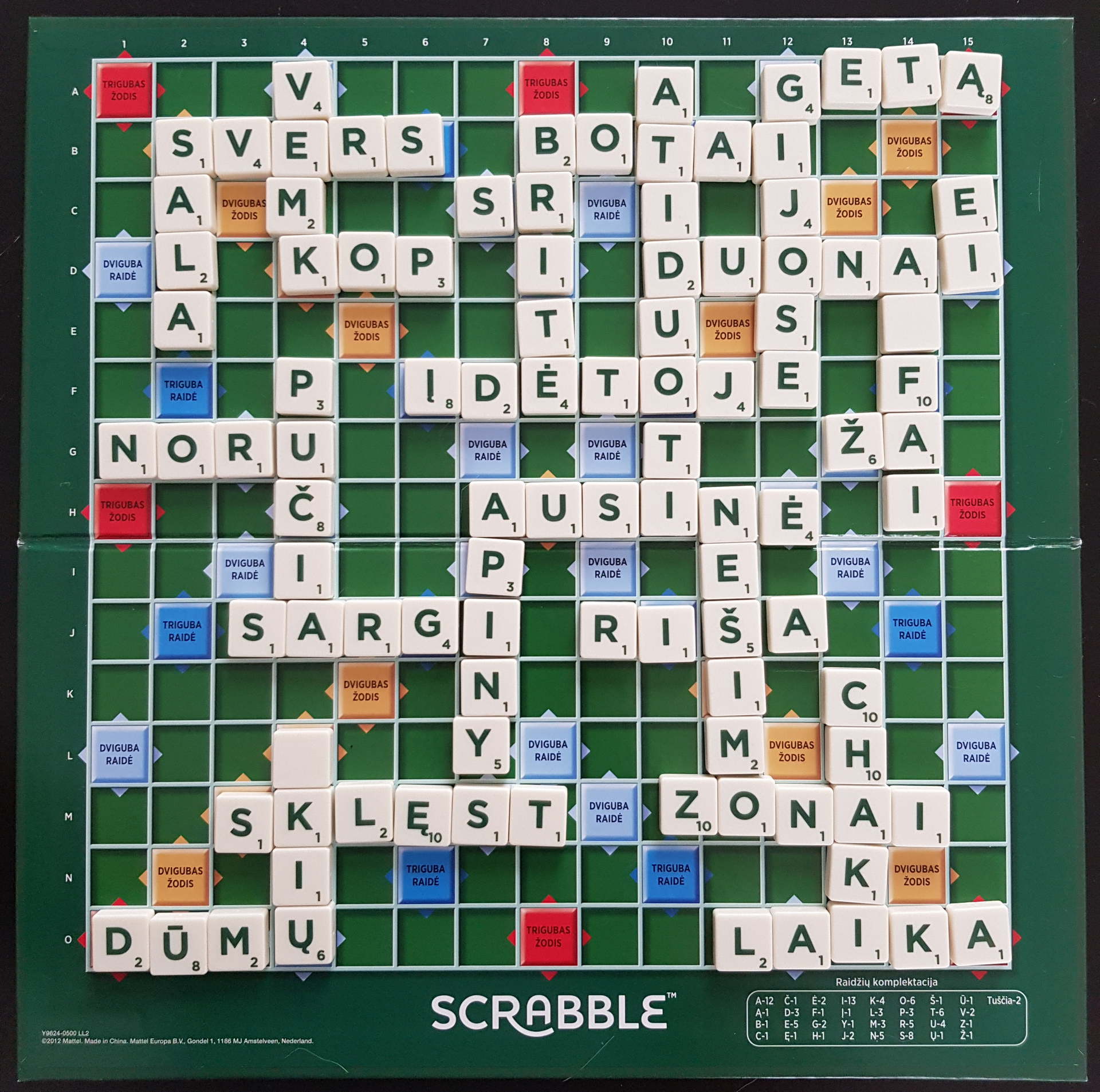
Scrabble gameplay in Lithuanian

KrisKros Klasik letter distribution
	×1	×2	×3	×4	×5	×6	×9	×11
0		[blank]						
1	Ą			N	O T U	E L S	A R	I
2	Ę	B G	D M P	K				
3	Ų	Ė Š						
4	Į V Ž	J						
5	Ū Z							
6	Y							
7	C Č							
10	F H							

The distribution for the older, unofficial, KrisKros Klasik is as follows:

- 2 blank tiles (scoring 0 points)
- 1 point: I ×11, A ×9, R ×9, E ×6, L ×6, S ×6, O ×5, T ×5, U ×5, N ×4, Ą ×1
- 2 points: K ×4, D ×3, M ×3, P ×3, B ×2, G ×2, Ę ×1
- 3 points: Ė ×2, Š ×2, Ų ×1
- 4 points: J ×2, Į ×1, V ×1, Ž ×1
- 5 points: Ū ×1, Z ×1
- 6 points: Y ×1
- 7 points: C ×1, Č ×1
- 10 points: F ×1, H ×1

=== Malay ===
Malay letter distribution
	×1	×2	×3	×4	×5	×6	×7	×8	×19
0		[blank]							
1					M R T	K U	E I	N	A
2				L S					
3			B D	G					
4		H O P							
5	J Y								
8	C W								
10	F Z								

Malay-language sets use these 100 tiles:

- 2 blank tiles (scoring 0 points)
- 1 point: A ×19, N ×8, E ×7, I ×7, K ×6, U ×6, M ×5, R ×5, T ×5
- 2 points: L ×4, S ×4
- 3 points: G ×4, B ×3, D ×3
- 4 points: H ×2, O ×2, P ×2
- 5 points: J ×1, Y ×1
- 8 points: C ×1, W ×1
- 10 points: F ×1, Z ×1

Q, V and X are absent because they are only present in loanwords. So are F and Z, but these two are not so rare.

Another Malay Scrabble game, called Sahibba, uses these tiles:

- 4 blank tiles (scoring 0 points)
- 2 points: A ×13, E ×9, I ×9, R ×7, T ×7, N ×6, L ×5, S ×5, U ×5, O ×2
- 4 points: D ×4, G ×4, B ×3, M ×3, P ×3
- 6 points: H ×2, K ×2, Y ×2, W ×1
- 8 points: C ×1, J ×1

Note that in this set there are some special tiles which you can choose one of two letters given on that tile. There are 3 A/E tiles, 1 A/I tile, 5 A/O tiles, 1 U/E tile, 2 U/O tiles, 1 B/V tile, 1 K/F tile, 1 K/Q tile, 1 K/V tile, 1 M/W tile, 1 M/X tile, 1 N/W tile, and 1 F/Z tile. The value of the F is 4, the value of the Q is 6, the value of the V is 4, the value of the X is 6, and the value of the Z is 4. F, Q, V, X and Z don't have their own tile because they are found only in loanwords in Malay.

Another distribution has the O worth 8 points, the G worth 6 points, the D worth 6 points, the M worth 2 points, the T worth 4 points, the L worth 4 points, the J worth 6 points, the E worth 4 points, and the S worth 4 points.

=== Norwegian ===
Norwegian letter distribution
	×1	×2	×3	×4	×5	×6	×7	×9
0		[blank]						
1					D I L	N R S T	A	E
2			M	F G K O				
3			H					
4		J P Å	B U V					
5		Ø						
6	Y Æ							
8	W							
10	C							

Norwegian-language editions of Scrabble use these 100 tiles:

- 2 blank tiles (scoring 0 points)
- 1 point: E ×9, A ×7, N ×6, R ×6, S ×6, T ×6, D ×5, I ×5, L ×5
- 2 points: F ×4, G ×4, K ×4, O ×4, M ×3
- 3 points: H ×3
- 4 points: B ×3, U ×3, V ×3, J ×2, P ×2, Å ×2
- 5 points: Ø ×2
- 6 points: Y ×1, Æ ×1
- 8 points: W ×1
- 10 points: C ×1

The letters Q, X and Z are absent since these letters are very rare and only occur in foreign words. These letters and the foreign letters "Ä", "Ö" and "Ü", which are used in a few Norwegian words, can be played with a blank. C and W also occur only in foreign words, but they are not so rare, so they were included.

=== Polish ===
Polish letter distribution
	×1	×2	×3	×4	×5	×6	×7	×8	×9
0		[blank]							
1				R S W	N Z	O	E	I	A
2			C D K L M P T	Y					
3		B G H J Ł U							
5	Ą Ę F Ó Ś Ż								
6	Ć								
7	Ń								
9	Ź								

Polish letter distribution (old)
	×1	×2	×3	×4	×5	×6	×7	×8
0		[blank]						
1				R S W	N Z	O	E	A I
2			C D K L M P T	Y				
3		B G H J Ł U						
4		F						
5	Ą Ę Ó Ś Ż							
6	Ć							
7	Ń Ź							

Polish letter distribution (Literaki)
	×1	×2	×3	×4	×5	×6	×7	×8	×9
0		[blank]							
1				R S W	N Z	O	E	I	A
2			C D K L M P T	Y					
3		B G H J Ł U							
5	Ą Ć Ę F Ń Ó Ś Ź Ż								

Polish letter distribution (Scriba)
	×1	×2	×3	×4	×5	×6	×7
0		[black dot]	[blank] [arrow]				
1					O	E I	A
2			D L M W	B N P R S Y	T Z		
3		U	C F H K				
4		J Ł	G				
6	Ą Ś	Ó					
7	Ć						
8	Ę Ń Ż Ź						

A complete Polish Scrabble set

Polish-language editions of Scrabble use these 100 tiles:

- 2 blank tiles (scoring 0 points)
- 1 point: A ×9, I ×8, E ×7, O ×6, N ×5, Z ×5, R ×4, S ×4, W ×4
- 2 points: Y ×4, C ×3, D ×3, K ×3, L ×3, M ×3, P ×3, T ×3
- 3 points: B ×2, G ×2, H ×2, J ×2, Ł ×2, U ×2
- 5 points: Ą ×1, Ę ×1, F ×1, Ó ×1, Ś ×1, Ż ×1
- 6 points: Ć ×1
- 7 points: Ń ×1
- 9 points: Ź ×1

This set has been used since 2000. Before that year, a slightly different configuration was used: Ź was worth 7 points, F was worth 4 points, and there were 2 F‍'s, and 8 A‍'s.

Literaki, a Polish online Scrabble-based game, uses the same distribution, but the maximum number of points for a tile is 5.

Alexander has released Scriba, which was based on the Swedish game Alfapet. The distribution has 108 tiles:

- 3 blank tiles (scoring 0 points), 2 black dot tiles (scoring 0 points), 3 arrow tiles (scoring 0 points)
- 1 point: A ×7, E ×6, I ×6, O ×5
- 2 points: T ×5, Z ×5, B ×4, N ×4, P ×4, R ×4, S ×4, Y ×4, D ×3, L ×3, M ×3, W ×3
- 3 points: C ×3, F ×3, H ×3, K ×3, U ×2
- 4 points: G ×3, J ×2, Ł ×2
- 6 points: Ó ×2, Ą ×1, Ś ×1
- 7 points: Ć ×1
- 8 points: Ę ×1, Ń ×1, Ż ×1, Ź ×1

The letters Q, V and X have always been absent (since they are used in foreign words). Blank tiles cannot be used to represent these except on the Internet Scrabble Club.

=== Portuguese ===
Portuguese letter distribution
	×1	×2	×3	×4	×5	×6	×7	×8	×10	×11	×14
0			[blank]								
1					T	M R	U	S	I O	E	A
2				C P	D L						
3		Ç	B	N							
4		F G H V									
5		J									
6	Q										
8	X Z										

Portuguese-language editions of Scrabble contain 120 tiles:

- 3 blank tiles (scoring 0 points)
- 1 point: A ×14, E ×11, I ×10, O ×10, S ×8, U ×7, M ×6, R ×6, T ×5
- 2 points: D ×5, L ×5, C ×4, P ×4
- 3 points: N ×4, B ×3, Ç ×2
- 4 points: F ×2, G ×2, H ×2, V ×2
- 5 points: J ×2
- 6 points: Q ×1
- 8 points: X ×1, Z ×1

While Ç is a separate tile, other diacritical marks are ignored. K, W, and Y are absent, since they are only present in loanwords in Portuguese, and were not even official letters until 2009.

Another version of the game called Palavras Cruzadas has one Ã tile worth 7 points, one K and one W tile worth 8 points, one Y tile worth 9 points, and the values of J, Q, Z and Ç are respectively 7, 10, 10 and 8.

=== Romanian ===
Romanian letter distribution
	×1	×2	×3	×4	×5	×6	×7	×9	×10	×11
0		[blank]								
1					C L U	N R S	T	E	A	I
2				P	O					
3				D						
4		F V	M							
5		B								
6		G								
8	H Z									
10	J X									

Romanian letter distribution (original)
	×1	×2	×3	×4	×5	×6	×7	×9	×10	×11
0		[blank]								
1				L	C O S	N U	R T	E	A	I
2				D P						
4			M							
8		F V								
9		B G								
10	H J X Z									

Romanian-language editions of Scrabble use these 100 tiles:

- 2 blank tiles (scoring 0 points)
- 1 point: I ×11, A ×10, E ×9, T ×7, N ×6, R ×6, S ×6, C ×5, L ×5, U ×5
- 2 points: O ×5, P ×4
- 3 points: D ×4
- 4 points: M ×3, F ×2, V ×2
- 5 points: B ×2
- 6 points: G ×2
- 8 points: H ×1, Z ×1
- 10 points: J ×1, X ×1

Some amendment applied in updated version. Previously, the B was worth 8, and the O was worth 1.

The original (1982) distribution used the following 100 tiles:

- 2 blank tiles (scoring 0 points)
- 1 point: A ×11, I ×10, E ×9, R ×7, T ×7, N ×6, U ×6, C ×5, O ×5, S ×5, L ×4
- 2 points: D ×4, P ×4
- 4 points: M ×3
- 8 points: F ×2, V ×2
- 9 points: B ×2, G ×2
- 10 points: H ×1, J ×1, X ×1, Z ×1

Diacritical marks are ignored, so for example Â is played as A. Both distributions lack K, Q, W and Y, since they are only used in foreign words. However, you can still use a blank to represent these letters. The letter X is also used only in loanwords and a few native words, but it is not so rare, so it is included.

=== Russian ===
Russian letter distribution
	×1	×2	×3	×4	×5	×8	×10
0		[blank]					
1				В	И Н Р С Т	А Е	О
2			М	Д К Л П У			
3	Ё	Б Г Ь Я					
4	Й	Ы					
5	Ж Х Ц Ч	З					
8	Ш Э Ю						
10	Ф Щ Ъ						

Russian letter distribution (original)
	×1	×2	×3	×4	×5	×6	×9	×10	×11
0		[blank]							
1					В С	Н Р Т	А	Е И	О
2				Д К Л М П У					
3		Ь	Б Г Ё	Я					
4		Й Ы							
5	Х Ц Ч	Ж З							
8	Ш Э Ю								
10	Ф Щ Ъ								

Russian letter distribution (Selchow & Righter)
	×1	×2	×3	×4	×5	×6	×9	×10	×12
0		[blank]							
1					В С	Н Р Т	А	Е И	О
2				Д К Л М П У					
3		Ь	Б Г	Я					
4		Й Ы							
5	Х Ц Ч	Ж З							
8	Ш Э Ю								
10	Ф Щ Ъ								

Russian letter distribution (Erudit)
	×1	×2	×3	×4	×5	×6	×8	×9	×10
0			[blank]						
1							И Н	Е	А О
2				Й Л	В Д М Т	К П Р С			
3			Б Г У Я						
5		Ж З Х Ч Ы Ь							
10	Ф Ц Ш Щ Ъ Э Ю								

Russian-language Scrabble sets, which use Cyrillic letters, contain 104 tiles using this distribution:

- 2 blank tiles (scoring 0 points)
- 1 point: О ×10, А ×8, Е ×8, И ×5, Н ×5, Р ×5, С ×5, Т ×5, В ×4
- 2 points: Д ×4, К ×4, Л ×4, П ×4, У ×4, М ×3
- 3 points: Б ×2, Г ×2, Ь ×2, Я ×2, Ё ×1
- 4 points: Ы ×2, Й ×1
- 5 points: З ×2, Ж ×1, Х ×1, Ц ×1, Ч ×1
- 8 points: Ш ×1, Э ×1, Ю ×1
- 10 points: Ф ×1, Щ ×1, Ъ ×1

The former Soviet distribution had 126 tiles and was as follows:

- 2 blank tiles (scoring 0 points)
- 1 point: О ×11, Е ×10, И ×10, А ×9, Н ×6, Р ×6, Т ×6, В ×5, С ×5
- 2 points: Д ×4, К ×4, Л ×4, М ×4, П ×4, У ×4
- 3 points: Я ×4, Б ×3, Г ×3, Ё ×3, Ь ×2
- 4 points: Ы ×2, Й ×2
- 5 points: Ж ×2, З ×2, Х ×1, Ц ×1, Ч ×1
- 8 points: Ш ×1, Э ×1, Ю ×1
- 10 points: Ф ×1, Щ ×1, Ъ ×1

In 1954, Selchow & Righter released their Foreign Language Edition in Russian with the following 124-tile distribution:

- 2 blank tiles (scoring 0 points)
- 1 point: О ×12, Е ×10, И ×10, А ×9, Н ×6, Р ×6, Т ×6, В ×5, С ×5
- 2 points: Д ×4, К ×4, Л ×4, М ×4, П ×4, У ×4
- 3 points: Я ×4, Б ×3, Г ×3, Ь ×2
- 4 points: Ы ×2, Й ×2
- 5 points: Ж ×2, З ×2, Х ×1, Ц ×1, Ч ×1
- 8 points: Ш ×1, Э ×1, Ю ×1
- 10 points: Ф ×1, Щ ×1, Ъ ×1

This distribution has no Ё tile.

Another Russian version, called Эрудит (Erudit), has 131 tiles, and also has no Ё tile:

- 3 blank tiles (scoring 0 points)
- 1 point: А ×10, И ×8, О ×10, Е ×9, Н ×8
- 2 points: К ×6, П ×6, Р ×6, С ×6, В ×5, Д ×5, М ×5, Т ×5, Й ×4, Л ×4
- 3 points: Б ×3, Г ×3, У ×3, Я ×3
- 5 points: Ж ×2, З ×2, Х ×2, Ч ×2, Ы ×2, Ь ×2
- 10 points: Ф ×1, Ц ×1, Ш ×1, Щ ×1, Ъ ×1, Э ×1, Ю ×1

In Erudit, only nominative singular and pluralia tantum nouns are allowed.

Another Russian word game based on Scrabble, called Slovodel (Словодел), uses these 110 tiles:

- 2 asterisk tiles (scoring zero points)
- 1 point: О ×10, А ×9, Е ×9, И ×7
- 2 points: Н ×7, К ×5, М ×5, П ×5, Р ×5, С ×5, Т ×5, Д ×4, Л ×4, В ×2
- 3 points: Б ×3, Г ×3, У ×3, Я ×3
- 4 points: З ×2, Ы ×2
- 5 points: Й ×2, Х ×2, Ч ×2, Ь ×2
- 7 points: Ж ×2
- 8 points: Ц ×1, Ш ×1, Ю ×1
- 9 points: Щ ×1, Э ×1
- 10 points: Ф ×1, Ъ ×1

=== Scottish Gaelic ===
Scottish Gaelic letter distribution
	×1	×2	×3	×4	×5	×6	×9	x12
0		[blank]						
1				S	D R	E	I	A H
2				B C G L M N O				
3			U					
4		À F	T					
6		È Ù						
8	Ì Ò P							

Scottish Gaelic-language editions of Scrabble, created in 2023, use these 100 tiles:

- 2 blanks (scoring 0 points)
- 1 point: A ×12, H ×12, I ×9, E ×6, D ×5, R ×5, S ×4
- 2 points: B ×4, C ×4, G ×4, L ×4, M ×4, N ×4, O ×4
- 3 points: U ×3
- 4 points: T ×3, À ×2, F ×2
- 6 points: È ×2, Ù ×2
- 8 points: Ì ×1, Ò ×1, P ×1

Á, É, and Ó are absent since they are now mostly obsolete in the Scottish Gaelic language. J, K, Q, V, W, X, Y, and Z are absent since they are not used in the Scottish Gaelic language.

Scottish Gaelic letter distribution (original Scrabble3D proposal)
	×1	×2	×3	×4	×9	×14
0		[blank]				
1				N O R S	E I	A
2		BH	U	CH D DH L		
3		B M	C G T TH			
4		NN				
5	F FH MH	À GH				
6	È Ì Ò P Ù					
8	LL RR					
10	NG					

Scrabble3D originally planned to use these 104 tiles in an unofficial distribution, planned earlier:

- 2 blank tiles (scoring 0 points)
- 1 point: A ×14, E ×9, I ×9, N ×4, O ×4, R ×4, S ×4
- 2 points: CH ×4, D ×4, DH ×4, L ×4, U ×3, BH ×2
- 3 points: C ×3, G ×3, T ×3, TH ×3, B ×2, M ×2
- 4 points: NN ×2
- 5 points: À ×2, GH ×2, F ×1, FH ×1, MH ×1
- 6 points: È ×1, Ì ×1, Ò ×1, P ×1, Ù ×1
- 8 points: LL ×1, RR ×1
- 10 points: NG ×1

The distribution was modified a bit (Dropping NG due to its rarity, adding more A, E, and I tiles, and changing the number of tiles to 100).

Scottish Gaelic letter distribution (Scrabble3D)
	×1	×2	×3	×4	×10	×11	×15
0		[blank]					
1	PH SH			N O R S	E	I	A
2	BH	U	CH D DH L				
3		B M	C G T TH				
4	NN						
5	À F FH GH MH						
6	È Ì Ò P Ù						
8	LL RR						

Scottish Gaelic-language sets used by Scrabble3D use these 100 tiles:

- 2 blank tiles (scoring 0 points)
- 1 point: A ×15, I ×11, E ×10, N ×4, O ×4, R ×4, S ×4, PH ×1, SH ×1
- 2 points: CH ×3, D ×3, DH ×3, L ×3, U ×2, BH ×1
- 3 points: C ×3, G ×3, T ×3, TH ×3, B ×2, M ×2
- 4 points: NN ×1
- 5 points: À ×1, F ×1, FH ×1, GH ×1, MH ×1
- 6 points: È ×1, Ì ×1, Ò ×1, P ×1, Ù ×1
- 8 points: LL ×1, RR ×1

H is absent from both Scrabble3D sets because it is almost exclusively used in lenited consonants.

=== Slovak ===
Slovak letter distribution (official)
	×1	×2	×3	×4	×5	×8	×9
0		[blank]					
1				R S T V	I N	E	A O
2			D K L P	M			
3		J U					
4	Á C H Y Z	B					
5	Č Í Š Ý Ž						
7	É Ľ Ť Ú						
8	Ď F G Ň Ô						
10	Ä Ĺ Ó Ŕ X						

Slovak letter distribution (extended 2013)
	×1	×2	×3	×4	×5	×6	×8	×9	×10
0		[blank]							
1				T	N S V	I	E	A	O
2		Á B J Y Z	D M P U	K L	R				
3	C Č É H Í Š Ú Ý Ž								
4	Ť								
5	Ľ								
6	F G								
7	Ň Ô								
8	Ä Ď Ó								
9	Ĺ Ŕ X								
10	Q W								

Slovak-language sets use these 100 tiles:

- 2 blank tiles (scoring 0 points)
- 1 point: A ×9, O ×9, E ×8, I ×5, N ×5, R ×4, S ×4, T ×4, V ×4
- 2 points: M ×4, D ×3, K ×3, L ×3, P ×3
- 3 points: J ×2, U ×2
- 4 points: B ×2, Á ×1, C ×1, H ×1, Y ×1, Z ×1
- 5 points: Č ×1, Í ×1, Š ×1, Ý ×1, Ž ×1
- 7 points: É ×1, Ľ ×1, Ť ×1, Ú ×1
- 8 points: Ď ×1, F ×1, G ×1, Ň ×1, Ô ×1
- 10 points: Ä ×1, Ĺ ×1, Ó ×1, Ŕ ×1, X ×1

Q, W, Ě, Ö, Ř, and Ü are absent because they are only used in loanwords, but may be represented with a blank. The letter X is also only used in loanwords, but it is not so rare, so it is included. The digraphs CH, DZ, and DŽ, although considered single letters in the Slovak alphabet, are played as pairs of letters.

Since 2013, a new 112-tile set was introduced, including the letters Q and W:

- 2 blank tiles (scoring 0 points)
- 1 point: O ×10, A ×9, E ×8, I ×6, N ×5, S ×5, V ×5, T ×4
- 2 points: R ×5, K ×4, L ×4, D ×3, M ×3, P×3, U ×3, Á ×2, B ×2, J ×2, Y ×2, Z ×2
- 3 points: C ×1, Č ×1, É ×1, H ×1, Í ×1, Š ×1, Ú ×1, Ý ×1, Ž ×1
- 4 points: Ť ×1
- 5 points: Ľ ×1
- 6 points: F ×1, G ×1
- 7 points: Ň ×1, Ô ×1
- 8 points: Ä ×1, Ď ×1, Ó ×1
- 9 points: Ĺ ×1, Ŕ ×1, X ×1
- 10 points: Q ×1, W ×1

Slovenský spolok Scrabble does not recommend using this new version, because the letters and their point values do not correspond to their frequency in Slovak.

Arguably the Q and W tiles should still not be included, but the manufacturer decided to, so that loanwords can be played. In the tournament rules for accepted words, however, there are only a few words with W (not including their inflections) and almost none with Q. Some players play these two just as two more blanks, or they just remove them from the set altogether.

=== Slovenian ===
Slovenian letter distribution
	×1	×2	×3	×4	×6	×7	×8	×9	×10	×11
0		[blank]								
1				J L T	R S	N	O	I	A	E
2				D V						
3		M P U	K							
4		B G Z								
5	Č H									
6	Š									
8	C									
10	F Ž									

Slovenian-language sets use these 100 tiles:

- 2 blank tiles (scoring 0 points)
- 1 point: E ×11, A ×10, I ×9, O ×8, N ×7, R ×6, S ×6, J ×4, L ×4, T ×4
- 2 points: D ×4, V ×4
- 3 points: K ×3, M ×2, P ×2, U ×2
- 4 points: B ×2, G ×2, Z ×2
- 5 points: Č ×1, H ×1
- 6 points: Š ×1
- 8 points: C ×1
- 10 points: F ×1, Ž ×1

Q, W, X and Y are absent, because Slovenian does not use those letters.

=== Spanish ===
Spanish letter distribution (international)
	×1	×2	×4	×5	×6	×9	×12
0		[blank]					
1			L T	N R U	I S	O	A E
2		G		D			
3		B M P	C				
4	F V Y	H					
5	CH Q						
8	J LL Ñ RR X						
10	Z						

Spanish letter distribution (North America)
	×1	×2	×3	×4	×5	×6	×7	×8	×11
0		[blank]							
1				L R T	N	I U	S	O	A E
2		G		C D					
3		P	B M						
4	Y	F H V							
6		J							
8	K LL Ñ Q RR W X								
10	Z								

Spanish letter distribution (Latin America)
	×1	×2	×3	×4	×6	×8	×9	×12
0		[blank]						
1			Ñ	L S U	N R T	O	A I	E
2		B	G	D				
3		C M P						
4		F H V Y	LL	CH				
5	K							
8	J X							
10	Q Z							

Complete tileset in Spanish Scrabble outside North America.

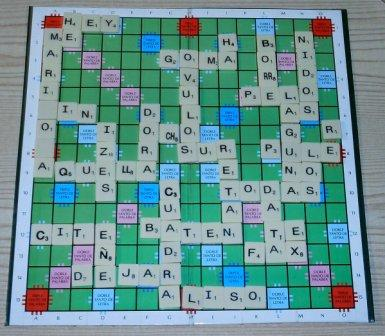
A Spanish Scrabble game completed.

Spanish-language sets sold outside North America use these 100 tiles:

- 2 blank tiles (scoring 0 points)
- 1 point: A ×12, E ×12, O ×9, I ×6, S ×6, N ×5, R ×5, U ×5, L ×4, T ×4
- 2 points: D ×5, G ×2
- 3 points: C ×4, B ×2, M ×2, P ×2
- 4 points: H ×2, F ×1, V ×1, Y ×1
- 5 points: CH ×1, Q ×1
- 8 points: J ×1, LL ×1, Ñ ×1, RR ×1, X ×1
- 10 points: Z ×1

Stress accents and diaereses are disregarded. The letters K and W are absent since these two letters are only used in words of foreign origin. According to FISE (Federación Internacional de Scrabble en Español) rules, a blank cannot be used to represent K or W; loanwords containing them are simply not playable.

Using one C and one H tile in place of the CH tile, two L tiles for the LL tile, or two R tiles for the RR tile is also not allowed in Spanish Scrabble, if the tile set includes those tiles.

Spanish-language sets sold within North America (known as Scrabble – Edición en Español) use - including "K" and "W" but without "CH" - these 103 tiles:

- 2 blank tiles (scoring 0 points)
- 1 point: A ×11, E ×11, O ×8, S ×7, I ×6, U ×6, N ×5, L ×4, R ×4, T ×4
- 2 points: C ×4, D ×4, G ×2
- 3 points: B ×3, M ×3, P ×2
- 4 points: F ×2, H ×2, V ×2, Y ×1
- 6 points: J ×2
- 8 points: K ×1, LL ×1, Ñ ×1, Q ×1, RR ×1, W ×1, X ×1
- 10 points: Z ×1

Stress accents are still disregarded.

Spanish-language sets sold within Latin America under the name Escarbar (a Spanish word for Scrabble) - including "K" and "CH" but without "RR" and "W" - use these 108 tiles:

- 2 blank tiles (scoring 0 points)
- 1 point: E ×12, A ×9, I ×9, O ×8, N ×6, R ×6, T ×6, L ×4, S ×4, U ×4, Ñ ×3
- 2 points: D ×4, G ×3, B ×2
- 3 points: C ×2, M ×2, P ×2
- 4 points: CH ×4, LL ×3, F ×2, H ×2, V ×2, Y ×2
- 5 points: K ×1
- 8 points: J ×1, X ×1
- 10 points: Q ×1, Z ×1

An unofficial practice in some variants of Spanish Scrabble is the permit of words with QU to be played with the Q and with or without the following U. This variant practice eliminates the Q-without-U difficulty that may otherwise occur.

=== Swedish ===
Swedish letter distribution
	×1	×2	×3	×5	×6	×7	×8
0		[blank]					
1				D I L	N	E	A R S T
2		H	G K M	O			
3		F V Ä					
4		B P Å Ö	U				
7	J Y						
8	C X						
10	Z						

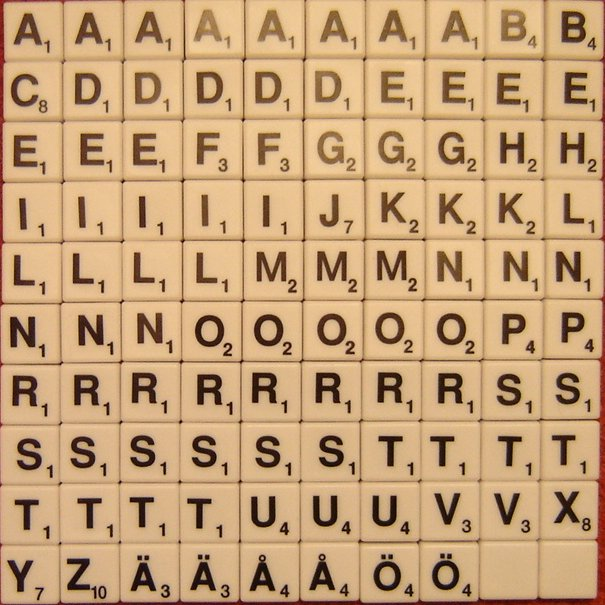
A full Swedish Scrabble set.

Swedish-language Scrabble sets (until 1990 sold in Sweden as Alfapet, but that became a different game) use these 100 tiles:

- 2 blank tiles (scoring 0 points)
- 1 point: A ×8, R ×8, S ×8, T ×8, E ×7, N ×6, D ×5, I ×5, L ×5
- 2 points: O ×5, G ×3, K ×3, M ×3, H ×2
- 3 points: F ×2, V ×2, Ä ×2
- 4 points: U ×3, B ×2, P ×2, Å ×2, Ö ×2
- 7 points: J ×1, Y ×1
- 8 points: C ×1, X ×1
- 10 points: Z ×1

Å, Ä and Ö have separate tiles as these are considered separate letters in the Swedish alphabet; other diacritics like that on É are ignored (except Ü). Q and W, found only in loanwords, are absent but can be played with a blank. Ü and Æ require a blank, and as of 2010 only occur in one and three playable words respectively: müsli and three forms of Laestadianism (læstadianism in Swedish).

Originally (starting in 1954), Swedish Scrabble sets (called Alfa-pet, made by the Swedish company Alga, since 1983 a member of the BRIO Group) used a slightly different distribution:

Swedish letter distribution #1
	×1	×2	×3	×5	×6	×7	×8	×9
0		[blank]						
1				D I L	N	E	A R S	T
2		H	G K M	O				
3		F V Ä						
4		B P Å Ö	U					
7	J Y							
8	X							
10	C							

- 2 blank tiles (scoring 0 points)
- 1 point: T ×9, A ×8, R ×8, S ×8, E ×7, N ×6, D ×5, I ×5, L ×5
- 2 points: O ×5, G ×3, K ×3, M ×3, H ×2
- 3 points: F ×2, V ×2, Ä ×2
- 4 points: U ×3, B ×2, P ×2, Å ×2, Ö ×2
- 7 points: J ×1, Y ×1
- 8 points: X ×1
- 10 points: C ×1

Note that Z was absent in this distribution as it is almost exclusively used in loanwords. However, it could be played with a blank.

Between 1956 and 1961, the makers of Alfa-pet revised the distribution, altering the number of tiles for the letters B, E, N, O, P, S, and U. The letter C was reduced in value to 5 and the X was increased to 10:

Swedish letter distribution #2
	×1	×2	×3	×4	×5	×6	×8	×9	10
0		[blank]							
1					D I L	S	A R	N T	E
2		H	G K M	O					
3		F V Ä							
4	B P	U Å Ö							
5	C								
7	J Y								
10	X								

- 2 blank tiles (scoring 0 points)
- 1 point: E ×10, N ×9, T ×9, A ×8, R ×8, S ×6, D ×5, I ×5, L ×5
- 2 points: O ×4, G ×3, K ×3, M ×3, H ×2
- 3 points: F ×2, V ×2, Ä ×2
- 4 points: U ×2, Å ×2, Ö ×2, B ×1, P ×1
- 5 points: C ×1
- 7 points: J ×1, Y ×1
- 10 points: X ×1

Circa 1961, the hyphen was dropped from the game's name, and the original Swedish distribution of the game had been restored. Sometime in the 1980s, produced under BRIO's subsidiary, Joker, the number of Ts in the set were reduced by one and an 8-point Z tile was added.

Swedish letter distribution #3
	×1	×2	×3	×5	×6	×7	×8
0		[blank]					
1				D I L	N	E	A R S T
2		H	G K M	O			
3		F V Ä					
4		B P Å Ö	U				
7	J Y						
8	X Z						
10	C						

In 2002, under the ownership of Mattel and its brand name Scrabble, the Swedish language set tile values of the C and Z were changed, respectively, to 8 and 10.

Alfapet letter distribution
	×1	×2	×3	×4	×5	×6	×7	×8	×9
0		[blank]							
1						I	D L N T	E S	A R
2				G	O				
3			H K M P U						
4		B F V Å Ä Ö							
8	J	C Y							
10	Q X Z								

Though Alga had lost its license to Mattel Europa in the early 1990s in the production of the game, the company held onto its ownership of the name Alfapet. subsequently it produced a different yet similar crossword board game. Played on a different grid layout, this game is played with a distribution which contains these 120 tiles, with Q but not W:

- 2 blank tiles (scoring 0 points), 2 black tiles (scoring 0 points), 2 left-pointing arrows, 2 right-pointing arrows
- 1 point: A ×9, R ×9, E ×8, S ×8, D ×7, L ×7, N ×7, T ×7, I ×6
- 2 points: O ×5, G ×4
- 3 points: H ×3, K ×3, M ×3, P ×3, U ×3
- 4 points: B ×2, F ×2, V ×2, Å ×2, Ä ×2, Ö ×2
- 8 points: C ×2, Y ×2, J ×1
- 10 points: Q ×1, X ×1, Z ×1

The black tile may be put in front of a word to create another word adjacent to the black tile and thus diagonally away from the original word. The arrows lets the player change the direction of a word anywhere between the first and last letter of the word, and are always placed under letters. Anyway, Q is only used in loanwords in modern Swedish, so it is included.

=== Turkish ===
Turkish letter distribution
	×1	×2	×3	×4	×5	×6	×7	×8	×12
0		[blank]							
1					N T	R	İ K L	E	A
2			O S U	I M					
3		B D Ü Y							
4		C Ç Ş Z							
5	G H P								
7	F Ö V								
8	Ğ								
10	J								

Turkish-language sets use these 100 tiles (including distinct dotted and dotless I tiles):

- 2 blank tiles (scoring 0 points)
- 1 point: A ×12, E ×8, İ ×7, K ×7, L ×7, R ×6, N ×5, T ×5
- 2 points: I ×4, M ×4, O ×3, S ×3, U ×3
- 3 points: B ×2, D ×2, Ü ×2, Y ×2
- 4 points: C ×2, Ç ×2, Ş ×2, Z ×2
- 5 points: G ×1, H ×1, P ×1
- 7 points: F ×1, Ö ×1, V ×1
- 8 points: Ğ ×1
- 10 points: J ×1

Since the letters Â, Î, and Û are considered modified versions of their base forms in Turkish, they are played as A, İ, and U, respectively. The letters Q, W, and X are not used in Turkish and therefore do not appear in the set. Blanks may not represent these letters.

(See a completed Turkish Scrabble board:)

=== Ukrainian ===
Ukrainian letter distribution
	×1	×2	×3	×4	×5	×7	×8	×10
0		[blank]						
1				В	Е І Т Р	И Н	А	О
2			Д П Л	К С М				
3			У					
4		З Я Б Г						
5	Х Й Ч Ь							
6	Ж Ї Ц Ш							
7	Ю							
8	Є Ф Щ							
10	Ґ '							

Optimum Ukrainian-language Scrabble sets, which use Cyrillic letters, contain 104 tiles using this distribution:

- 2 blank tiles (scoring 0 points)
- 1 point: О ×10, А ×8, И ×7, Н ×7, Е ×5, І ×5, Т ×5, Р ×5, В ×4
- 2 points: К ×4, С ×4, М ×4, Д ×3, Л ×3, П ×3
- 3 points: У ×3
- 4 points: З ×2, Я ×2, Б ×2, Г ×2,
- 5 points: Ч ×1, Х ×1, Й ×1, Ь ×1
- 6 points: Ж ×1, Ї ×1, Ц ×1, Ш ×1
- 7 points: Ю ×1
- 8 points: Є ×1, Ф ×1, Щ ×1
- 10 points: Ґ ×1, ' ×1

The apostrophe sign is also included, even though it is not a letter in the Ukrainian alphabet.

=== Welsh ===
Welsh letter distribution
	×1	×2	×3	×4	×5	×6	×7	×8	×10
0		[blank]							
1				DD	W	D O	I R Y	E N	A
2			F G L U						
3		B M T	S						
4		C FF H TH							
5	CH LL P								
8	J								
10	NG RH								

The box for Welsh-language Scrabble sets.

Welsh-language Scrabble sets, created in 2005, use these 105 tiles:

- 2 blank tiles (scoring 0 points)
- 1 point: A ×10, E ×8, N ×8, I ×7, R ×7, Y ×7, D ×6, O ×6, W ×5, DD ×4
- 2 points: F ×3, G ×3, L ×3, U ×3
- 3 points: S ×3, B ×2, M ×2, T ×2
- 4 points: C ×2, FF ×2, H ×2, TH ×2
- 5 points: CH ×1, LL ×1, P ×1
- 8 points: J ×1
- 10 points: NG ×1, RH ×1

Since there are specific tiles for the digraphs that are considered to be separate letters in Welsh orthography (such as DD), it is not permissible to use the individual letters to spell these out. Diacritics on letters are ignored.

The polygraphs MH, NGH, NH and PH also exist in Welsh, but they are omitted because they are used almost exclusively in mutated words, which the rules disallow. K, Q, V, X and Z do not exist in Welsh. J does not exist in traditional Welsh either, but it is included as it is used in some borrowed words.

== Unofficial editions ==
Scrabble editions listed in this section are not created nor licensed by Hasbro nor Mattel.

=== Anglo-Saxon ===
Anglo-Saxon letter distribution
	×1	×2	×3	×4	×5	×6	×8	×9	×14
0		[blank]							
1				G H I L	D S	O R	A	N	E
2			F M T W						
3			Æ C U						
4		Ð Þ Y							
5	B								
8	P								
10	X								

The Anglo-Saxon editions use these 101 tiles:

- 2 blank tiles (scoring 0 points)
- 1 point: E ×14, N ×9, A ×8, O ×6, R ×6, D ×5, S ×5, G ×4, H ×4, I ×4, L ×4
- 2 points: F ×3, M ×3, T ×3, W ×3
- 3 points: Æ ×3, C ×3, U ×3
- 4 points: Ð ×2, Þ ×2, Y ×2
- 5 points: B ×1
- 8 points: P ×1
- 10 points: X ×1

Anglo-Saxon uses the letter K, but it only occurs in one word (kyning, usually written cyning) and loanwords, so there is no tile for it. Anglo-Saxon uses the letter Z, but it is a very rare spelling of TS, and is used in loanwords for the sound of Z in modern English, so there is no tile for it. Q is only used in loanwords. J and V did not exist as letters separate from I and U. Anglo-Saxon uses the letter Ƿ, but it was replaced by W in this set because it can be easily confused with P. Anglo-Saxon also uses the letter Ȝ, but it is a typographic variant of G, so that is used instead.

=== Armenian ===
Armenian letter distribution
	×1	×2	×3	×4	×5	×6	×7	×8	×10	×18
0			[blank]							
1						Ս	Կ Ն	Ո	Ե Ի	Ա
2				Է Հ Մ Յ Պ	Տ Ր Ւ					
3		Վ	Բ Գ Դ Ք	Լ						
4		Խ Շ Ռ								
5		Թ Ծ Ղ Ց								
6	Զ Ճ Չ Ջ									
8	Ժ Ձ Փ Օ									
10	Ը Ֆ									

Armenian-language editions use the following 146 tiles. The board is 17x17 instead of 15x15. This version is called ԲԱՌ ԽԱՂ (bar khagh, meaning words game).

- 3 blank tiles (scoring 0 points)
- 1 point: Ա (a) ×18, Ե (ye / e) ×10, Ի (i) ×10, Ո (vo / o) ×8, Կ (k) ×7, Ն (n) ×7, Ս (s) ×6
- 2 points: Տ (t) ×5, Ր (r) ×5, Ւ (w) ×5, Է (ė) ×4, Հ (h) ×4, Մ (m) ×4, Յ (y) ×4, Պ (p) ×4
- 3 points: Լ (l) ×4, Բ (b) ×3, Գ (g) ×3, Դ (d) ×3, Ք (k') ×3, Վ (v) ×2
- 4 points: Խ (kh) ×2, Շ (sh) ×2, Ռ (ṙ) ×2
- 5 points: Թ (t') 2, Ծ (ts) ×2, Ղ (gh) ×2, Ց (ts') ×2
- 6 points: Զ (z) ×1, Ճ (ch) ×1, Չ (ch') ×1, Ջ (j) ×1
- 8 points: Ժ (zh) ×1, Ձ (dz) ×1, Փ (p') ×1, Օ (ȯ) ×1
- 10 points: Ը (ë) ×1, Ֆ (f) ×1

Notice that this distribution lacks և, another Armenian character used as a letter in Eastern Armenian, because it was produced in Syria, where classical Armenian spelling is used for the Western Armenian which is spoken there.

=== Bambara ===
Bambara letter distribution
	×1	×2	×3	×4	×5	×6	×15
0		[blank]					
1					B M	E Ɛ I K L N O	A
2			R	S Y	U		
3		D T	Ɔ				
4		F G W					
8	C Ɲ	J					
10	H Ŋ P Z						

Bambara-language Scrabble sets use these 106 tiles:

- 2 blank tiles (scoring 0 points)
- 1 point: A ×15, E ×6, Ɛ ×6, I ×6, K ×6, L ×6, N ×6, O ×6, B ×5, M ×5
- 2 points: U ×5, S ×4, Y ×4, R ×3
- 3 points: Ɔ ×3, D ×2, T ×2
- 4 points: F ×2, G ×2, W ×2
- 8 points: J ×2, C ×1, Ɲ ×1
- 10 points: H ×1, Ŋ ×1, P ×1, Z ×1

The Latin alphabetic letters Q, V, and X are absent because these letters are not used in Bambara.

=== Basque ===
Basque letter distribution
	×1	×2	×3	×4	×5	×6	×8	×9	×12	×14
0		[blank]								
1						O T U	N	I	E	A
2					K R					
3				D						
4			B Z							
5		G H L S								
8	J M P RR TS TX TZ									
10	F X									

Basque-language Euskarbel sets use these 100 tiles.

- 2 blank tiles (scoring 0 points)
- 1 point: A ×14, E ×12, I ×9, N ×8, O ×6, T ×6, U ×6
- 2 points: K ×5, R ×5
- 3 points: D ×4
- 4 points: B ×3, Z ×3
- 5 points: G ×2, H ×2, L ×2, S ×2
- 8 points: J ×1, M ×1, P ×1, RR ×1, TS ×1, TX ×1, TZ ×1
- 10 points: F ×1, X ×1

Diacritical marks are ignored. Ñ is part of the Basque language but used so infrequently that it has no tile. C, Q, V, W and Y are absent because they are only used in loanwords. Digraphs can be formed with two tiles.

=== Bicolano ===
Bicolano letter distribution
	×2	×3	×4	×5	×6	×8	×12	×16
0	[blank]							
1				M S T U		N O	I	A
2		K R	G					
3		L P			NG			
4		B D						
5	W Y							
8	E H							

Dama nin Tataramon, an independently produced Bicolano language variant of Scrabble, uses these 102 tiles:

- 2 blank tiles (scoring 0 points)
- 1 point: A ×16, I ×12, N ×8, O ×8, M ×5, S ×5, T ×5, U ×5
- 2 points: G ×4, K ×3, R ×3
- 3 points: NG ×6, L ×3, P ×3
- 4 points: B ×3, D ×3
- 5 points: W ×2, Y ×2
- 8 points: E ×2, H ×2

The games uses the Abakada alphabet; hence the foreign letters of the present Filipino alphabet, C, F, J, Q, V, X, Z, and even Ñ, are absent. None of these letters can be played with a blank. Also, N and G being played in place of NG is not allowed.

=== Breton ===
Breton letter distribution
	×1	×2	×3	×4	×5	×6	×7	×9	×12	×14
0		[blank]								
1				I L	T U	O	R	N	A	E
2				D						
3		H	G S V							
4	CH C'H	B K M Z ZH								
5	P									
10	F J W Y									

Breton-language Scrabble sets, created in 2008 as Skrabell, use these 100 tiles:

- 2 - (hyphen) tiles scoring 0 points
- 1 point: E ×14, A ×12, N ×9, R ×7, O ×6, T ×5, U ×5, I ×4, L ×4
- 2 points: D ×4
- 3 points: G ×3, S ×3, V ×3, H ×2
- 4 points: B ×2, K ×2, M ×2, Z ×2, ZH ×2, CH ×1, C'H ×1
- 5 points: P ×1
- 10 points: F ×1, J ×1, W ×1, Y ×1

C, Q, and X are absent because they are only used in loanwords or, in the case of C, the digraphs CH and C'H. However, these letters can be played with a blank. Diacritical marks are ignored.

=== Cornish ===
Cornish letter distribution
	×1	×2	×3	×4	×5	×6	×7	×10	×11
0		[blank]							
1						N	O R S	A	E
2			C G	D H T	L		Y		
3		I	U W						
4		B K M P							
5		V							
6	F								
7	Q								

Cornish-language Scrabble sets use these 100 tiles.

- 2 blank tiles (scoring 0 points)
- 1 point: E ×11, A ×10, O ×7, R ×7, S ×7, N ×6
- 2 points: Y ×7, L ×5, D ×4, H ×4, T ×4, C ×3, G ×3
- 3 points: U ×3, W ×3, I ×2
- 4 points: B ×2, K ×2, M ×2, P ×2
- 5 points: V ×2
- 6 points: F ×1
- 7 points: Q ×1

J has no tile because it is only used in a few native words (jy/je, bleujen) and in loanwords from English or French. X and Z have no tiles because these letters are only used in loanwords. This set uses the Standard Written Form with alternative spellings allowed. Apostrophes and diacritical marks are ignored. Any grammatical form may be used. This set was created by Ian Jackson in September 2018.

=== Dakelh ===
Dakelh letter distribution
	×1	×2	×3	×4	×5	×7	×8	×10
0		[blank]						
1						A I L O T ʼ	N	H U
2					E S			
3			Z	D				
4		K						
5		G Y						
7	W							
8	B							
10	C J M							

Dakelh-language Scrabble sets use these 100 tiles:

- 2 blank tiles (scoring 0 points)
- 1 point: H ×10, U ×10, N ×8, A ×7, I ×7, L ×7, O ×7, T ×7, ʼ ×7
- 2 points: E ×5, S ×5
- 3 points: D ×4, Z ×3
- 4 points: K ×2
- 5 points: G ×2, Y ×2
- 7 points: W ×1
- 8 points: B ×1
- 10 points: C ×1, J ×1, M ×1

The letters F, P, R, and V, which are used only in loanwords in Dakelh and are very infrequent, are absent. The letters Q and X are also absent because these letters are not used in Dakelh.

=== Dakota ===
Dakota letter distribution
	×1	×2	×3	×4	×6	×8	×10	×12
0		[blank]						
1				P U	K Ŋ O T	E	I	A
2			C H					
3		D N S	W Y					
4		Ġ J M Ṡ Z						
5		Ḣ						
6	G							
8	B C̣ Ḳ							
10	P̣ Ṭ							

Dakota-language Scrabble sets use these 100 tiles:

- 2 blank tiles (scoring 0 points)
- 1 point: A ×12, I ×10, E ×8, K ×6, Ŋ ×6, O ×6, T ×6, P ×4, U ×4
- 2 points: C ×3, H ×3
- 3 points: W ×3, Y ×3, D ×2, N ×2, S ×2
- 4 points: Ġ ×2, J ×2, M ×2, Ṡ ×2, Z ×2
- 5 points: Ḣ ×2
- 6 points: G ×1
- 8 points: B ×1, C̣ ×1, Ḳ ×1
- 10 points: P̣ ×1, Ṭ ×1

F, L, Q, R, V, X are absent since Dakota does not use these letters.

=== Esperanto ===
Esperanto letter distribution
	×1	×2	×3	×4	×6	×8
0		[blank]				
1				L T U	N R S	A E I O
2			D J P	K M		
3		F G Ĝ V				
4	C Ŝ	B Ĉ				
5	Z					
8	H Ŭ					
10	Ĥ Ĵ					

Esperanto letter distribution (original)
	×1	×2	×3	×4	×5	×6	×7	×9	×11	×13
0		[blank]								
1						T	O	E N	I	A
2				K	M	L R S				
3			D J P U							
4		F G V								
5		Ŝ	B							
6	Ŭ	Ĝ								
7		Ĉ Z								
8		C								
9	H									
10	Ĥ	Ĵ								

Esperanto Scrabble exists as an Internet game and as a commercially produced custom set.

Esperanto-language sets use these 100 tiles:

- 2 blank tiles (scoring 0 points).
- 1 point: A ×8, E ×8, I ×8, O ×8, N ×6, R ×6, S ×6, L ×4, T ×4, U ×4
- 2 points: K ×4, M ×4, D ×3, J ×3, P ×3
- 3 points: F ×2, G ×2, Ĝ ×2, V ×2
- 4 points: B ×2, Ĉ ×2, C ×1, Ŝ ×1
- 5 points: Z ×1
- 8 points: H ×1, Ŭ ×1
- 10 points: Ĥ ×1, Ĵ ×1

The original Esperanto set used these 120 tiles:

- 2 blank tiles (scoring 0 points).
- 1 point: A ×13, I ×11, E ×9, N ×9, O ×7, T ×6
- 2 points: L ×6, R ×6, S ×6, M ×5, K ×4
- 3 points: D ×3, J ×3, P ×3, U ×3
- 4 points: F ×2, G ×2, V ×2
- 5 points: B ×3, Ŝ ×2
- 6 points: Ĝ ×2, Ŭ ×1
- 7 points: Ĉ ×2, Z ×2
- 8 points: C ×2
- 9 points: H ×1
- 10 points: Ĵ ×2, Ĥ ×1

Q, W, X, and Y are not present in either set, since Esperanto does not use those letters.

=== Galician ===
Galician letter distribution
	×1	×2	×3	×4	×5	×6	×7	×8	×9	×10	×12
1				T	C	I L N	S	R	O	E	A
2			D U								
3		B P		M							
4	V	G									
5	F H X										
6	Z										
7	Ñ Q										
8	K										
9	W Y										
10	J										

Galician-language sets use these 100 tiles:

- 1 point: A ×12, E ×10, O ×9, R ×8, S ×7, I ×6, L ×6, N ×6, C ×5, T ×4
- 2 points: D ×3, U ×3
- 3 points: M ×4, B ×2, P ×2
- 4 points: G ×2, V ×1
- 5 points: F ×1, H ×1, X ×1
- 6 points: Z ×1
- 7 points: Ñ ×1, Q ×1
- 8 points: K ×1
- 9 points: W ×1, Y ×1
- 10 points: J ×1

Stress accents and diaereses are disregarded. This is called Letrad@s.GZ (originally Scrabble.GZ). J, K, W, and Y are officially non-existent in Galician, but they are included here as they are sometimes used in borrowed words. Blanks do not exist in this game.

=== Gwichʼin ===
Gwichʼin letter distribution
	×1	×2	×4	×5	×6	×7	×8	×9	×12	×17	×19
0			[blank]								
1	Ę Į O Ǫ U Ų	E		Ą		H	T	N	A	I	ʼ
2	ĮĮ OO ǪǪ TH UU ŲŲ		ĄĄ II			CH EE	AA				
3	S TTH W		AII AĮĮ D G K R Y								
4	DH GH KH SH	L Ł TR			TS						
5	Z	J TŁ V									
6	DR KW		GW ZH								
7	DDH KHW SHR	DL									
8	DZ										
9	ZHR										
10	B F M										

Gwichʼin-language editions of Scrabble contain 200 letter tiles, in the following distribution:

- 4 blank tiles (scoring 0 points)
- 1 point: ʼ ×19, I ×17, A ×12, N ×9, T ×8, H ×7, Ą ×5, E ×2, Ę ×1, Į ×1, O ×1, Ǫ ×1, U ×1, Ų ×1
- 2 points: AA ×8, CH ×7, EE ×7, ĄĄ ×4, II ×4, ĘĘ ×1, ĮĮ ×1, OO ×1, ǪǪ ×1, TH ×1, UU ×1, ŲŲ ×1
- 3 points: AII ×4, AĮĮ ×4, D ×4, G ×4, K ×4, R ×4, Y ×4, S ×1, TTH ×1, W ×1
- 4 points: TS ×6, L ×2, Ł ×2, TR ×2, DH ×1, GH ×1, KH ×1, SH ×1
- 5 points: J ×2, TŁ ×2, V ×2, Z ×1
- 6 points: GW ×4, ZH ×4, DR ×1, KW ×1
- 7 points: DL ×2, DDH ×1, KHW ×1, SHR ×1
- 8 points: DZ ×1
- 9 points: ZHR ×1
- 10 points: B ×1, F ×1, M ×1

Grave accents are ignored. Digraphs and trigraphs can be played with multiple tiles. GHW, ND, NH, NJ, and RH are not included, as these digraphs and trigraphs are very rare in Gwichʼin. C, P, Q, and X are also absent because these letters are not used in Gwichʼin, or, in the case of C, outside the digraph CH. Arguably B, F, and M are not used in Gwichʼin either, but they are included as these letters are used for borrowed words.

=== Haitian Creole ===
Haitian Creole letter distribution
	×1	×2	×3	×4	×6	×8	×9
0		[blank]					
1					I	E	A N
2				È K L M O OU P S T Y			
3			D				
4		CH F G J Ò R V W	B				
7	Z						
8	À UI						
10	H						

Haitian Creole-language editions of Scrabble contain these 100 tiles:

- 2 blank tiles (scoring 0 points)
- 1 point: A ×9, N ×9, E ×8, I ×6
- 2 points: È ×4, K ×4, L ×4, M ×4, O ×4, OU ×4, P ×4, S ×4, T ×4, Y ×4
- 3 points: D ×3
- 4 points: B ×3, CH ×2, F ×2, G ×2, J ×2, Ò ×2, R ×2, V ×2, W ×2
- 7 points: Z ×1
- 8 points: À ×1, UI ×1
- 10 points: H ×1

X has no tile as it is only used in loanwords in Haitian Creole. C, Q and U are absent, since they are not used in Haitian Creole, or, in the case of C, outside the digraph CH, and U outside the digraphs OU and UI.

=== Hausa ===
Hausa letter distribution
	×1	×2	×3	×4	×5	×6	×8	×9	×14
0		[blank]							
1						D K S U Y	N	I	A
2					M				
3				B E H R T W					
4			G L O						
5		C F J							
7	Ɗ Ƙ Z								
8	Ɓ								
9	TS '								
10	'Y								

Hausa-language Scrabble sets use these 114 tiles:

- 2 blank tiles (scoring 0 points)
- 1 point: A ×14, I ×9, N ×8, D ×6, K ×6, S ×6, U ×6, Y ×6
- 2 points: M ×5
- 3 points: B ×4, E ×4, H ×4, R ×4, T ×4, W ×4
- 4 points: G ×3, L ×3, O ×3
- 5 points: C ×2, F ×2, J ×2
- 7 points: Ɗ ×1, Ƙ ×1, Z ×1
- 8 points: Ɓ ×1
- 9 points: TS ×1, ‍'‍×1
- 10 points: ‍'Y‍×1

This version is made for Hausa in Nigeria. In Niger, a Ƴ tile would be used instead of a ‍'Y‍ tile. P has no tile, as it is only used in loanwords in Hausa and is very infrequent. SH has no tile because it is not a letter in all Hausa alphabets. R̃, which was created to distinguish the two R phonemes, has no tile as the phonemes are not always distinguished by Hausa speakers. Q, V, and X have no tiles because these letters are not used at all in Hausa.

=== Hawaiian ===
Hawaiian letter distribution
	×1	×3	×4	×5	×6	×8	×11	×20	×21
0				[blank]					
1									A
2							O	K	
3						I N			
4					E				
5				U					
6				H					
7			L						
8		M P							
9	W								

There is no official Hawaiian-language edition of Scrabble, but one suggested version contains these 100 tiles:

- 5 blank tiles (scoring 0 points)
- 1 point: A ×21
- 2 points: K ×20, O ×11
- 3 points: I ×8, N ×8
- 4 points: E ×6
- 5 points: U ×5
- 6 points: H ×5
- 7 points: L ×4
- 8 points: M ×3, P ×3
- 9 points: W ×1

B, C, D, F, G, J, Q, R, S, T, V, X, Y, and Z have no tiles as they are not used in Hawaiian. For the sake of the geocache this is connected to, the distribution had to be modified a bit. For example, there should be A ×28, E ×7, K ×11, and U ×6. The diacritical marks and the okina ' are ignored.

=== Igbo ===
Igbo letter distribution
	×1	×2	×3	×4	×5	×6	×8
0				[blank]			
1							A E I Ị O Ọ U Ụ
2						D R T	
3					B M		
4			K S	F N			
5			H L	G			
6			P	W			
7		Y					
10	C J Ṅ V Z						

Igbo-language sets use these 134 tiles, and a 19×19-tile board:

- 4 blank tiles (scoring 0 points)
- 1 point: A ×8, E ×8, I ×8, Ị ×8, O ×8, Ọ ×8, U ×8, Ụ ×8
- 2 points: D ×6, R ×6, T ×6
- 3 points: B ×5, M ×5
- 4 points: F ×4, N ×4, K ×3, S ×3
- 5 points: G ×4, H ×3, L ×3
- 6 points: W ×4, P ×3
- 7 points: Y ×2
- 10 points: C ×1, J ×1, Ṅ ×1, V ×1, Z ×1

While C is only used in the digraph CH, the C was likely included because the CH is played with a C and an H. It is unknown if a blank can be used to represent CH. Q and X are not included as these letters are not used in Igbo.

=== IPA English ===
IPA English letter distribution
	×1	×2	×3	×4	×5	×6	×7
0		[blank]					
1			ɛ z	d i m	k ɹ	ɪ l s t	ə n
2		b oʊ p	ɑ æ				
3		aɪ eɪ f ɡ ɔ v					
4	h ŋ ʃ u w						
5	dʒ j tʃ						
8	aʊ ɔɪ θ ʊ						
10	ð ʒ						

IPA sets use these 106 tiles:

- 2 blank tiles (scoring 0 points)
- 1 point: ə ×7, n ×7, ɪ ×6, l ×6, s ×6, t ×6, k ×5, ɹ ×5, d ×4, i ×4, m ×4, ɛ ×3, z ×3
- 2 points: ɑ ×3, æ ×3, b ×2, oʊ ×2, p ×2
- 3 points: aɪ ×2, eɪ ×2, f ×2, ɡ ×2, ɔ ×2, v ×2
- 4 points: h ×1, ŋ ×1, ʃ ×1, u ×1, w ×1
- 5 points: dʒ ×1, j ×1, tʃ ×1
- 8 points: aʊ ×1, ɔɪ ×1, θ ×1, ʊ ×1
- 10 points: ð ×1, ʒ ×1

ɒ and a are not included as they are allophones of ɑ in varieties of English that have the father–bother merger, including most of the United States. e is an allophone of eɪ. ɫ is an allophone of l. ɱ is an allophone of m. o is an allophone of oʊ. ɾ and r are allophones of ɹ. ʌ, ɜ, ɚ and ɝ are allophones of ə. ʍ is an allophone of w. ʔ is not considered a phoneme in English. The affricates ts and dz do not have their own tiles, and so must be formed with two. But for a few exceptional cases, e.g. the sounds c, ɣ, ɨ, ɯ, ɲ, ø, œ, q, ɻ, ʉ, x, and y are not used in American English. An extended version has 1 ʙ worth 14, 1 ʛ worth 12, 1 ħ worth 9, 1 kʼ worth 11, 1 ɮ worth 11, 1 ɲ worth 13, 1 ʉ worth 11, 1 ⱱ worth 11, 1 ǃ worth 16, and 1 ʘ worth 18.

IPA English letter distribution (Scrabble3D)
	×1	×2	×3	×4	×5	×6	×7	×8
0		[blank]						
1		æ	ɛ ɝ i m p z	d k ɫ r	n s	t	ə	ɪ
2		b e ʊ						
3		a ɑ f ɡ ŋ ɔ o ʃ v						
4	u w ʒ							
5	h j							
8	θ							
10	ð							

An alternative by Scrabble3D has this distribution (no combinations):

- 2 blank tiles (scoring 0 points)
- 1 point: ɪ ×8, ə ×7, t ×6, n ×5, s ×5, d ×4, k ×4, ɫ ×4, r ×4, ɛ ×3, ɝ ×3, i ×3, m ×3, p ×3, z ×3, æ ×2
- 2 points: b ×2, e ×2, ʊ ×2
- 3 points: a ×2, ɑ ×2, f ×2, ɡ ×2, ŋ ×2, ɔ ×2, o ×2, ʃ ×2, v ×2
- 4 points: u ×1, w ×1, ʒ ×1
- 5 points: h ×1, j ×1
- 8 points: θ ×1
- 10 points: ð ×1

Another IPA English letter distribution (Scrabble3D)
	×1	×2	×3	×4	×5	×6	×7	×8
0		[blank]						
1						r n	s t l ɪ	ə
2			ɝ	p z i d	k			
3		b ŋ	æ ɛ	m				
4		ɑ eɪ oʊ aɪ f						
5		ɡ ɔ v						
6	w u ʃ							
7	dʒ h tʃ							
8	aʊ θ j							
9	ɔɪ ʊ							
10	ð ʒ							

Another distribution by Scrabble3D has the following distribution:

- 2 blank tiles (scoring 0 points)
- 1 point: ə ×8, s ×7, t ×7, l ×7, ɪ ×7, r ×6, n ×6
- 2 points: k ×5, p ×4, z ×4, i ×4, d ×4, ɝ ×3
- 3 points: m ×4, æ ×3, ɛ ×3, b ×2, ŋ ×2
- 4 points: ɑ ×2, eɪ ×2, oʊ ×2, aɪ ×2, f ×2
- 5 points: ɡ ×2, ɔ ×2, v ×2
- 6 points: w ×1, u ×1, ʃ ×1
- 7 points: dʒ ×1, h ×1, tʃ ×1
- 8 points: aʊ ×1, θ ×1, j ×1
- 9 points: ɔɪ ×1, ʊ ×1
- 10 points: ð ×1, ʒ ×1

=== Japanese Hiragana ===
Japanese Hiragana letter distribution
	×1	×2	×3	×4
0		[blank]		
1				いうかしたてとのん
2			きくこつなにはよれ	
3	ら	あけすせもりるわ		
4	さそちま			
5	おひふゆ			
6	ほめや			
8	えへみ			
10	ねむろ			
12	ぬ			

The Japanese Hiragana Scrabble set uses these 100 tiles:

- 2 blank tiles (scoring 0 points)
- 1 point: い (I) ×4, う (U) ×4, か (KA) ×4, し (SHI) ×4, た (TA) ×4, て (TE) ×4, と (TO) ×4, の (NO) ×4, ん (N/N') ×4
- 2 points: き (KI) ×3, く (KU) ×3, こ (KO) ×3, つ (TSU) ×3, な (NA) ×3, に (NI) ×3, は (HA) ×3, よ (YO) ×3, れ (RE) ×3
- 3 points: あ (A) ×2, け (KE) ×2, す (SU) ×2, せ (SE) ×2, も (MO) ×2, り (RI) ×2, る (RU) ×2, わ (WA) ×2, ら (RA) ×1
- 4 points: さ (SA) ×1, そ (SO) ×1, ち (CHI) ×1, ま (MA) ×1
- 5 points: お (O) ×1, ひ (HI) ×1, ふ (FU) ×1, ゆ (YU) ×1
- 6 points: ほ (HO) ×1, め (ME) ×1, や (YA) ×1
- 8 points: え (E) ×1, へ (HE) ×1, み (MI) ×1
- 10 points: ね (NE) ×1, む (MU) ×1, ろ (RO) ×1
- 12 points: ぬ (NU) ×1

The obsolete letters ゐ (WI) and ゑ (WE), the letter を (WO) now exclusively used as a grammatical particle, and the lengthener ー have no tiles.

In this version, words are played as collated in the dictionary:

- Modified letters with the diacritics ゛ and ゜, as well as the small letters (ぁぃぅぇぉっゃゅょゎ) are played using the unmodified letter: e.g. ディスコ (disuko "disco") is played with the tiles ていすこ (te i su ko).
- In addition, lengtheners are played by doubling the previous tile's vowel: e.g. ラーメン (rāmen ramen noodles) is played with the tiles らあめん (ra a me n).
- These modifications are applied per word; that is, theoretically, the same tile つ can validly stand for づ horizontally, and っ vertically:

			あ		
こ	と	は	つ	か	い
			か		

- The words played are 言葉遣い (ことばづかい kotobazukai) and 悪化 (あっか akka). The player is allowed to extend vertically into 扱う (あつかう atsukau).

This version was created by a student from Japan, and is not in wide circulation.

Japanese Hiragana letter distribution (Scrabble3D)
	×1	×2	×3	×4	×5	×6	×8	×9	×10
0		[blank]							
1							い	ん	う
2					く き か ょ り る	し			
3			け と す さ て が っ	じ こ つ ゅ ち せ た					
4			ま な お み あ え に ら は れ の そ め ひ ど ゃ						
5		も だ わ ふ げ ぶ よ ぎ ば や ほ ご ろ む び ぼ ね							
6		で ぐ ぜ ゆ ざ ず							
8	へ べ ぞ								
10	を ぱ								
15	づ ぬ ぽ ぷ ぴ ぺ ぢ								

A larger, more popular set by Scrabble3D uses these 214 tiles:

- 2 blank tiles (scoring 0 points)
- 1 point: う (U) ×10, ん (N) ×9, い (I) ×8
- 2 points: し (SHI) ×6, く (KU) ×5, き (KI) ×5, か (KA) ×5, ょ (Small YO) ×5, り (RI) ×5, る (RU) ×5
- 3 points: じ (JI) ×4, こ (KO) ×4, つ (TSU) ×4, ゅ (Small YU) ×4, ち (CHI) ×4, せ (SE) ×4, た (TA) ×4, け (KE) ×3, と (TO) ×3, す (SU) ×3, さ (SA) ×3, て (TE) ×3, が (GA) ×3, っ (Small TSU) ×3
- 4 points: ま (MA) ×3, な (NA) ×3, お (O) ×3, み (MI) ×3, あ (A) ×3, え (E) ×3, に (NI) ×3, ら (RA) ×3, は (HA) ×3, れ (RE) ×3, の (NO) ×3, そ (SO) ×3, め (ME) ×3, ひ (HI) ×3, ど (DO) ×3, ゃ (Small YA) ×3
- 5 points: も (MO) ×2, だ (DA) ×2, わ (WA) ×2, ふ (FU) ×2, げ (GE) ×2, ぶ (BU) ×2, よ (YO) ×2, ぎ (GI) ×2, ば (BA) ×2, や (YA) ×2, ほ (HO) ×2, ご (GO) ×2, ろ (RO) ×2, む (MU) ×2, び (BI) ×2, ぼ (BO) ×2, ね (NE) ×2
- 6 points: で (DE) ×2, ぐ (GU) ×2, ぜ (ZE) ×2, ゆ (YU) ×2, ざ (ZA) ×2, ず (ZU) ×2
- 8 points: へ (HE) ×1, べ (BE) ×1, ぞ (ZO) ×1
- 10 points: を (WO) ×1, ぱ (PA) ×1
- 15 points: づ (DZU) ×1, ぬ (NU) ×1, ぽ (PO) ×1, ぷ (PU) ×1, ぴ (PI) ×1, ぺ (PE) ×1, ぢ (DJI) ×1

In this version, words are played as they are written in all-kana text, and 9 tiles are played at a time. That is, in the 214-tile variant, the word ヨーロッパ (yōroppa "Europe") is played with the tiles よ, blank, ろ, っ, and ぱ (there is no tile for ー), while in the 100-tile variant, it is played as よ, お, ろ, つ, and は.

The obsolete letters ゐ and ゑ, letters only used in loanwords ぇ, ゎ, ぃ, ぁ, ぅ, and ぉ, along with the lengthener ー, have no tiles (with the first three letters and the lengthener being playable with a blank). Blank tiles may be played as standalone diacritics ゛ and ゜.

=== Japanese Romaji ===
Japanese Romaji letter distribution (with -) #2
	×1	×2	×3	×4	×5	×6	×7	×10	×11	×12
0		[blank]								
1							N	O	I	A U
2				H R T	E	K S				
3		-	M							
4		G Y								
5		B D								
6	J Z									
8	F P W									
10	C									

Japanese Romaji Scrabble sets use these 102 tiles:

- 2 blank tiles (scoring 0 points)
- 1 point: A ×12, U ×12, I ×11, O ×10, N ×7
- 2 points: K ×6, S ×6, E ×5, H ×4, R ×4, T ×4
- 3 points: M ×3, - ×2
- 4 points: G ×2, Y ×2
- 5 points: B ×2, D ×2
- 6 points: J ×1, Z ×1
- 8 points: F ×1, P ×1, W ×1
- 10 points: C ×1

L, Q and X are absent as they do not exist in Japanese. V, which exists only in loanwords, is absent because of its rare frequency. It can be used for a blank with 20 points reward for each play. - represents long vowel. Romaji scrabble games consist of all 3 scripts used in Japanese language - Hiragana, Katakana and Kanji in romanized form.

Japanese Romaji letter distribution (without -) #2
	×1	×2	×3	×4	×5	×6	×7	×10	×12	×13
0			[blank]							
1							N	O	A I	U
2				R T	E	K S				
3			M	H						
4		G Y								
5		B D								
6	J Z									
8	F P W									
10	C									

- 2 blank tiles (scoring 0 points)
- 1 point: U ×13, A ×12, I ×12, O ×10, N ×7
- 2 points: K ×6, S ×6, E ×5, R ×4, T ×4
- 3 points: H ×4, M ×3
- 4 points: G ×2, Y ×2
- 5 points: B ×2, D ×2
- 6 points: J ×1, Z ×1
- 8 points: F ×1, P ×1, W ×1
- 10 points: C ×1

This version does not use the long vowel "-". For instance, 東京(Tokyo) is played as "toukyou", 優秀(excellent) is played as "yuushuu" and ユース(youth) is played as "yuusu".

Japanese Romaji letter distribution #1 (Scrabble3D)
	×1	×2	×3	×5	×10	×11	×12
0		[blank]					
1				E	N	A	O U
2				H K S T			
3		Y	R				
4		B G					
5		M P					
6	J Z						
8	D W (-)						
10	C F						

Scrabble3D has a different distribution, released earlier:

- 2 blank tiles (scoring 0 points)
- 1 point: O ×12, U ×12, A ×11, I ×11, N ×10, E ×5
- 2 points: H ×5, K ×5, S ×5, T ×5
- 3 points: R ×3, Y ×2
- 4 points: B ×2, G ×2
- 5 points: M ×2, P ×2
- 6 points: J ×1, Z ×1
- 8 points: D ×1, W ×1, (- ×1)
- 10 points: C ×1, F ×1

The - for long vowels is optional (not in the standard set). V has no tile, but can be played with a blank.

=== Klingon ===
Klingon letter distribution
	×1	×2	×3	×4	×5	×6	×8	×10
0		[blank]						
1					H	o u	e ɪ	ʼ a
2				D v	j m			
3		b ch gh n q S	l					
4		p t						
5		w y						
6	Q r							
8	tlh							
10	ng							

Klingon-language sets use these 100 tiles:

- 2 blank tiles (scoring 0 points)
- 1 point: ʼ ×10, a ×10, e ×8, ɪ ×8, o ×6, u ×6, H ×5
- 2 points: j ×5, m ×5, D ×4, v ×4
- 3 points: l ×3, b ×2, ch ×2, gh ×2, n ×2, q ×2, S ×2
- 4 points: p ×2, t ×2
- 5 points: w ×2, y ×2
- 6 points: Q ×1, r ×1
- 8 points: tlh ×1
- 10 points: ng ×1

The letter tiles may show Klingon symbols (pIqaD), their renderings in the English alphabet, or both.

An older Klingon distribution by a different manufacturer (which is also not official) uses these 102 tiles (the first game was missing the blanks):

Klingon letter distribution (old)
	×1	×2	×3	×4	×5	×6	×8	×11
0		[blank]						
1			m v			ʼ H u	e ɪ o	a
2		r	D gh j S	l				
3		q	t		b			
4		ch n p w y						
8	Q							
10	ng tlh							

- 2 blank tiles (scoring 0 points)
- 1 point: a ×11, e ×8, ɪ ×8, o ×8, ʼ ×6, H ×6, u ×6, m ×3, v ×3
- 2 points: l ×4, D ×3, gh ×3, j ×3, S ×3, r ×2
- 3 points: b ×5, t ×3, q ×2
- 4 points: ch ×2, n ×2, p ×2, w ×2, y ×2
- 8 points: Q ×1
- 10 points: ng ×1, tlh ×1

These versions are separate from Hasbro's own licensed "Star Trek Scrabble" game, in which players can receive bonus points by playing Klingon words using standard English-language tiles.

=== L33t ===
L33t letter distribution
	×1	×2	×3	×4	×5	×6
0		*				
1		S	T	A I L O U		E N R
2			G Z 7	D 0	1 4	3
3		B C M P		X		
4		F H V W Y				
5	K					
6	J					
10	Q					

Marketed as L33t Tiles by the now defunct Wiremelon, LLC, editions of an English-L33tspeak variant of Scrabble contain 103 letter tiles in the following distribution:

- 2 asterisk [*] tiles (scoring 0 points)
- 1 point: E ×6, N ×6, R ×6, A ×4, I ×4, L ×4, O ×4, U ×4, T ×3, S ×2
- 2 points: 3 ×6, 1 ×5, 4 ×5, D ×4, 0 ×4, G ×3, Z ×3, 7 ×3
- 3 points: X ×4, B ×2, C ×2, M ×2, P ×2
- 4 points: F ×2, H ×2, V ×2, W ×2, Y ×2
- 5 points: K ×1
- 6 points: J ×1
- 10 points: Q ×1

=== Lojban ===
Lojban letter distribution
	×1	×2	×3	×4
0			[blank]	
1		A C E M S T 'A 'E 'I	L N U	I R
2	O Y CI KA LA LI MA NA RA RI SE	B D G J K P 'O 'U		
3	F V X Z BA CA DA GA JI KU MI NI NU PA RE RU SA SI TA TE TI XA			
4	BI CE CU DE DI DU FA GU JA JU KE KI LE LU MU NE NO PE PI RO SU TO TU VA VI			
5	BE BO BU CY DY FE FI FU GE GI JE JY KO KY LO ME MO NY PO PU RY SO SY TY VE XE ZA ZU ZY			
6	BY CO DO FO FY GY LY MY PY VO VY XI XU			
7	JO ZE			
8	XY ZI			
10	GO VU			

Lojban-language sets use these 160 tiles:

- 3 blank tiles (scoring 0 points)
- 1 point: I ×4, R ×4, L ×3, N ×3, U ×3, A ×2, C ×2, E ×2, M ×2, S ×2, T ×2, 'A ×2, 'E ×2, 'I ×2
- 2 points: B ×2, D ×2, G ×2, J ×2, K ×2, P ×2, 'O ×2, 'U ×2, O ×1, Y ×1, CI ×1, KA ×1, LA ×1, LI ×1, MA ×1, NA ×1, RA ×1, RI ×1, SE ×1
- 3 points: F ×1, V ×1, X ×1, Z ×1, BA ×1, CA ×1, DA ×1, GA ×1, JI ×1, KU ×1, MI ×1, NI ×1, NU ×1, PA ×1, RE ×1, RU ×1, SA ×1, SI ×1, TA ×1, TE ×1, TI ×1, XA ×1
- 4 points: BI ×1, CE ×1, CU ×1, DE ×1, DI ×1, DU ×1, FA ×1, GU ×1, JA ×1, JU ×1, KE ×1, KI ×1, LE ×1, LU ×1, MU ×1, NE ×1, NO ×1, PE ×1, PI ×1, RO ×1, SU ×1, TO ×1, TU ×1, VA ×1, VI ×1
- 5 points: BE ×1, BO ×1, BU ×1, CY ×1, DY ×1, FE ×1, FI ×1, FU ×1, GE ×1, GI ×1, JE ×1, JY ×1, KO ×1, KY ×1, LO ×1, ME ×1, MO ×1, NY ×1, PO ×1, PU ×1, RY ×1, SO ×1, SY ×1, TY ×1, VE ×1, XE ×1, ZA ×1, ZU ×1, ZY ×1
- 6 points: BY ×1, CO ×1, DO ×1, FO ×1, FY ×1, GY ×1, LY ×1, MY ×1, PY ×1, VO ×1, VY ×1, XI ×1, XU ×1
- 7 points: JO ×1, ZE ×1
- 8 points: XY ×1, ZI ×1
- 10 points: GO ×1, VU ×1

The combination XO is absent as it is only used in 7 words (binxo, ganxo, jerxo, sirxo, xogji, xotli, and xo'u). The combination ZO is absent as it is only used in 7 words (brazo, kinzo, zo'a, zo'e, zo'i, zo'o, and zo'u). The combination 'Y is absent as it is only used in 1 word (.y'y). The letter . occurs in Lojban, but it is so infrequent that it has no tile. Blanks can be used to represent any of the above letters (including .) and digrams (including XO, ZO, and 'Y). The letter ' occurs in Lojban, but only in digrams and never as one letter. The letters H, Q, and W are absent, because these letters are not used in Lojban.

Lojban Scrabble letter distribution (1990s) (lujvo included)
	×1	×2	×3	×4	×5	×6	×7	×8	×10
0		[blank]							
1					E	U	N R	Y	A I
2				L O S T '					
3			C J K M						
4		B D F G P							
6	V X								
9	Z								

Lojban-language sets in the 1990s (which include lujvo) use these 100 tiles:

- 2 blank tiles (scoring 0 points)
- 1 point: A ×10, I ×10, Y ×8, N ×7, R ×7, U ×6, E ×5
- 2 points: L ×4, O ×4, S ×4, T ×4, ' ×4
- 3 points: C ×3, J ×3, K ×3, M ×3
- 4 points: B ×2, D ×2, F ×2, G ×2, P ×2
- 6 points: V ×1, X ×1
- 9 points: Z ×1

Lojban Scrabble letter distribution (1990s) (lujvo not included)
	×1	×2	×3	×4	×5	×6	×7	×8	×12
0		[blank]							
1				'	R	E	N	U	A I
2				C L S T	O				
3			D J K M						
5		B F G P							
8	V								
9	X								
10	Z								

Lojban-language sets in the 1990s (which do not include lujvo) use these 100 tiles:

- 2 blank tiles (scoring 0 points)
- 1 point: A ×12, I ×12, U ×8, N ×7, E ×6, R ×5, ' ×4
- 2 points: O ×5, C ×4, L ×4, S ×4, T ×4
- 3 points: D ×3, J ×3, K ×3, M ×3
- 5 points: B ×2, F ×2, G ×2, P ×2
- 8 points: V ×1
- 9 points: X ×1
- 10 points: Z ×1

Y is absent because it is very rare outside lujvo.

=== Malagasy ===
Malagasy letter distribution
	×1	×2	×4	×5	×6	×11	×13	×14	×20
0		[blank]							
1			E S Y	K	T	I	N	O	A
2		F M V							
3		D L							
4		B P							
6	H J R Z								
10	G								

Malagasy-language sets use these 102 tiles:

- 2 blank tiles (scoring 0 points)
- 1 point: A ×20, O ×14, N ×13, I ×11, T ×6, K ×5, E ×4, S ×4, Y ×4
- 2 points: F ×2, M ×2, V ×2
- 3 points: D ×2, L ×2
- 4 points: B ×2, P ×2
- 6 points: H ×1, J ×1, R ×1, Z ×1
- 10 points: G ×1

C, Q, U, W, and X are absent because these letters are not used in Malagasy. Diacritical marks are ignored.

=== Māori ===
Māori letter distribution (Scramble)
	×3	×6	×10	×12	×15	×20	×25
0	[blank]						
1						U	A I O
2				K N W	E R T		
3			H M P				
4			NG				
5		WH					

Māori-language sets (known as Scramble) use these 225 tiles:

- 3 blank tiles (scoring 0 points)
- 1 point: A ×25, I ×25, O ×25, U ×20
- 2 points: E ×15, R ×15, T ×15, K ×12, N ×12, W ×12
- 3 points: H ×10, M ×10, P ×10
- 4 points: NG ×10
- 5 points: WH ×6

Diacritical marks are ignored. B, C, D, F, G, J, L, Q, S, V, X, Y, and Z are absent because these letters are not used in Māori, or, for G, outside the NG digraph.

Māori letter distribution (Kuputupu)
	×2	×3	×4	×5	×7	×9	×10	×13
0	[blank]							
1						O	E I U	A
2				K	R T			
3				H	N			
4				P				
5			W	M				
10		G						

Another version, called Kuputupu, uses these 102 tiles:

- 2 blank tiles (scoring 0 points)
- 1 point: A ×13, E ×10, I ×10, U ×10, O ×9
- 2 points: R ×7, T ×7, K ×5
- 3 points: N ×7, H ×5
- 4 points: P ×5
- 5 points: M ×5, W ×4
- 10 points: G ×3

=== Macedonian ===
Macedonian distribution
	×1	×2	×3	×4	×5	×6	×7	×9	×12
0		[blank]							
1					С Т	Н	Р О	И Е	А
2				К Л В П					
3			У Д М						
4		З Б Г							
5	Ц Ч Ј Ш								
6	Ж Ф Њ								
8	Х								
10	Ѓ Ѕ Љ Ќ Џ								

Macedonian-language sets use these 106 tiles.

- 2 blank tiles (worth 0 points)
- 1 point: А ×12, Е ×9, И ×9, О ×7, Р ×7, Н ×6, Т ×5, С ×5
- 2 points: К ×4, Л ×4, В ×4, П ×4
- 3 points: У ×3, Д ×3, М ×3
- 4 points: З ×2, Б ×2, Г ×2
- 5 points: Ч ×1, Ц ×1, Ј ×1, Ш ×1
- 6 points: Ж ×1, Ф ×1, Њ ×1
- 8 points: Х ×1
- 10 points: Ѓ×1, Ѕ ×1, Љ×1, Ќ ×1, Џ ×1

The diacritics Ѐ and Ѝ are ignored, as they are only used as grammatical particles and played as Е and И respectively.

=== Math ===
Math tile distribution
	×1	×2	×6	×7	×8	×9	×14
0		[blank]					
1					2	1	=
2				0 3 4			
3			8	5 6			
4			7 9				
8		+ − × ÷					
10	√ ² ³ ! ^ .						

Math sets in Scrabble3D use these 100 tiles:

- 2 blank tiles (scoring 0 points)
- 1 point: = ×14, 1 ×9, 2 ×8
- 2 points: 0 ×7, 3 ×7, 4 ×7
- 3 points: 5 ×7, 6 ×7, 8 ×6
- 4 points: 7 ×6, 9 ×6
- 8 points: + ×2, − ×2, × ×2, ÷ ×2
- 10 points: √ ×1, ² ×1, ³ ×1, ! ×1, ^ ×1, . ×1

To play, you have to put in a correct equation on the board.

Math tile distribution (old)
	×1	×3	×4	×6	×7	×8	×10	×18
0		[blank]						=
1							1	
2						2		
3				0	4 5			
4				8 9	3 6			
5				7				
6			+ − ×					
7		÷ √						
8		.						
9	^							
10	! ² ³ ∜ ∞ < >							

Math sets in Scrabble3D previously used these 120 tiles:

- 3 blank tiles (scoring 0 points)
- 0 points: = ×18
- 1 point: 1 ×10
- 2 points: 2 ×8, 4 ×7, 5 ×7
- 3 points: 0 ×6
- 4 points: 3 ×7, 6 ×7, 8 ×6, 9 ×6
- 5 points: 7 ×6
- 6 points: + ×4, − ×4, × ×4
- 7 points: ÷ ×3, √ ×3
- 8 points: . ×3
- 9 points: ^ ×1
- 10 points: ! ×1, ² ×1, ³ ×1, ∜ ×1, ∞ ×1, < ×1, > ×1

Math tile distribution (Equate Junior)
	×1	×2	×3	×4	×9	×11	×40
0			[blank]				=
1			0 1		2 3 4 5	+	
2	²/₂ ³/₃ ⁴/₄ ⁶/₆				6 7 8 9	−	
3						×	
4				¹/₂			
5	⁵/₂ ³/₆	²/₄				÷	
6		¹/₄ ³/₄					
7	⁷/₄						
8		¹/₃ ²/₃					
9	²/₆ ⁴/₆						
10	¹/₆						
12	⁵/₆						

Equate sets contain fractions. There are two sets, a junior version only with positive integers, addition, subtraction, multiplication, division and equality symbols and an advanced version also with negative integers, integer exponents, square roots, etc. The junior version is played on a 19×19 board and uses these 190 tiles:

- 3 blank tiles (scoring 0 points)
- 0 points: = ×40
- 1 point: 0 ×3, 1 ×3, 2 ×9, 3 ×9, 4 ×9, 5 ×9, + ×11
- 2 points: 6 ×9, 7 ×9, 8 ×9, 9 ×9, − ×11, ²/₂ ×1, ³/₃ ×1, ⁴/₄ ×1, ⁶/₆ ×1
- 3 points: × ×11
- 4 points: ¹/₂ ×4
- 5 points: ÷ ×11, ⁵/₂ ×1, ²/₄ ×2, ³/₆ ×1
- 6 points: ¹/₄ ×2, ³/₄ ×2
- 7 points: ⁷/₄ ×1
- 8 points: ¹/₃ ×2, ²/₃ ×2
- 9 points: ²/₆ ×1, ⁴/₆ ×1
- 10 points: ¹/₆ ×1
- 12 points: ⁵/₆ ×1

Math tile distribution (Scrabble3D Equate)
	×1	×2	×4	×6	×7	×8	×9	×10	×12	×36
0			[blank]							
1							2	1		=
2						0 3 4				
3					8	5 6			× ÷	
4				+ -	7 9					
5		¹/₄ ³/₄	¹/₂							
6		¹/₃ ²/₃								
7		¹/₆ ⁵/₆								
8	¹/₅ ²/₅ ³/₅ ⁴/₅ ¹/₈ ³/₈ ⁵/₈ ⁷/₈									
9	¹/₁₀ ³/₁₀ ⁷/₁₀ ⁹/₁₀ ¹/₁₂ ⁵/₁₂ ⁷/₁₂ ¹¹/₁₂									
10	¹/₇ ²/₇ ³/₇ ⁴/₇ ⁵/₇ ⁶/₇ ¹/₉ ²/₉ ⁴/₉ ⁵/₉ ⁷/₉ ⁸/₉									

An improved version with tile distribution revised, reducible fractions and fractions ≥ 1 removed and including all irreducible fractions between 0 and 1 with all denominators from 2 to 10 and 12 can be played in Scrabble3D on a 21×21 board with 10 tiles in the rack and uses these 200 tiles:

- 4 blank tiles (scoring 0 points)
- 1 point: = ×36, 1 ×10, 2 ×9
- 2 points: 0 ×8, 3 ×8, 4 ×8
- 3 points: 5 ×8, 6 ×8, 8 ×7, × ×12, ÷ ×12
- 4 points: 7 ×7, 9 ×7, + ×6, − ×6
- 5 points: ¹/₂ ×4, ¹/₄ ×2, ³/₄ ×2
- 6 points: ¹/₃ ×2, ²/₃ ×2
- 7 points: ¹/₆ ×2, ⁵/₆ ×2
- 8 points: ¹/₅ ×1, ²/₅ ×1, ³/₅ ×1, ⁴/₅ ×1, ¹/₈ ×1, ³/₈ ×1, ⁵/₈ ×1, ⁷/₈ ×1
- 9 points: ¹/₁₀ ×1, ³/₁₀ ×1, ⁷/₁₀ ×1, ⁹/₁₀ ×1, ¹/₁₂ ×1, ⁵/₁₂ ×1, ⁷/₁₂ ×1, ¹¹/₁₂ ×1
- 10 points: ¹/₇ ×1, ²/₇ ×1, ³/₇ ×1, ⁴/₇ ×1, ⁵/₇ ×1, ⁶/₇ ×1, ¹/₉ ×1, ²/₉ ×1, ⁴/₉ ×1, ⁵/₉ ×1, ⁷/₉ ×1, ⁸/₉ ×1

Math tile distribution (A-Math)
	×1	×4	×5	×6
1				=
2		+ − × /	0 1 2 3 4	
3			6 8 9	
4		7	5	
5	10 12 15 16			
6	11 14 18 20			
7	13 17 19			

A-Math sets, which are widely used for playing in Thailand, contain two digit numbers from 10 to 20. For any of the two player games, each player is provided with 4 +, 4 −, 4 ×, 4 / and 6 = for using them any time throughout the entire game. For any of the solo games, the player gets 6 +, 6 −, 6 ×, 6 / and 9 = for using them any time throughout the entire game. Two digit numbers can be concatenated with one digit numbers, numbers more than three digits are not allowed, − can be placed before any of the numbers but neither after any of the + nor after any of the −, but + cannot be placed before any of the numbers either as the first character of any of the equations or after any of the operators and bingo bonuses are worth only 40 points for two player games and 50 points for solo games. It is played on a 15×15 board with 6 number tiles in the rack and uses these 82 number tiles from 0 to 20 for any of the two player games:

- 1 point: = ×6
- 2 points: 0 ×5, 1 ×5, 2 ×5, 3 ×5, 4 ×5, + ×4, − ×4, × ×4, / ×4
- 3 points: 6 ×5, 8 ×5, 9 ×5
- 4 points: 5 ×5, 7 ×4
- 5 points: 10 ×1, 12 ×1, 15 ×1, 16 ×1
- 6 points: 11 ×1, 14 ×1, 18 ×1, 20 ×1
- 7 points: 13 ×1, 17 ×1, 19 ×1

=== Na'vi ===
Na'vi letter distribution
	×1	×2	×3	×4	×5	×6	×8	×12
0		[blank]						
1					I M U	L O T	E Ì N	A
2			K NG	P R ʼ				
3		AW	Ä S					
4		TS TX Y						
5	EY H RR V W							
8	AY F KX Z							
10	EW LL PX							
12	B D G	Ù						
20	•							

Na'vi language sets use these 120 tiles:

- 2 blank tiles (scoring 0 points)
- 1 point: A ×12, E ×8, Ì ×8, N ×8, L ×6, O ×6, T ×6, I ×5, M ×5, U ×5
- 2 points: P ×4, R ×4, ʼ ×4, K ×3, NG ×3
- 3 points: Ä ×3, S ×3, AW ×2
- 4 points: TS ×2, TX ×2, Y ×2
- 5 points: EY ×1, H ×1, RR ×1, V ×1, W ×1
- 8 points: AY ×1, F ×1, KX ×1, Z ×1
- 10 points: EW ×1, LL ×1, PX ×1
- 12 points: Ù ×2, B ×1, D ×1, G ×1
- 20 points: • ×1

This set accommodates both Forest and Reef Na'vi (which is the only dialect which uses the 12 and 20 point tiles), and the point values are actually shown in octal instead of decimal. The • is only used between N and G to indicate it is not a digraph. Note that C, J, and Q have no tiles because these letters are not used in Na'vi (except the rare use of C as an alternative spelling of the digraph TS). Note that X is only used in the KX, PX, and TX digraphs. You cannot spell digraphs with two tiles. This set was created by LearnNa'vi.org.

Na'vi letter distribution (pre-2022 reform)
	×1	×2	×3	×4	×5	×6	×8	×12
0		[blank]						
1				I R	O U	L N T Y	E	A
2			Ä S	Ì ʼ				
3			K M P					
4		F G V W						
5	H							
8			X					
10	Z							

An archaic set, created without using the digraphs as their own tiles, and before the language was revised and the Reef Dialect was added, used 100 tiles:

- 2 blank tiles (scoring 0 points)
- 1 point: A ×12, E ×8, L ×6, N ×6, T ×6, Y ×6, O ×5, U ×5, I ×4, R ×4
- 2 points: Ì ×4, ʼ ×4, Ä ×3, S ×3
- 3 points: K ×3, M ×3, P ×3
- 4 points: F ×2, G ×2, V ×2, W ×2
- 5 points: H ×1
- 8 points: X ×3
- 10 points: Z ×1

=== Nuxalk ===
Nuxalk letter distribution
	×2	×3	×4	×5	×6	×7	×8	×9	×10	×12	x20	×25
1							TS U	LH M	I K	T	S	A
2				TLʼ X	Q Qʼ Y	L N						
3			AA C CW Kʼ KW P Tʼ TSʼ XW									
4	UU	QW	KWʼ W									
5	II	QWʼ										
7	Pʼ											
9	H											
11	7											

The Nuxalk-language edition uses these 212 tiles:

- 1 point: A ×25, S ×20, T ×12, I ×10, K ×10, LH ×9, M ×9, TS ×8, U ×8
- 2 points: L ×7, N ×7, Q ×6, Qʼ ×6, Y ×6, TLʼ ×5, X ×5
- 3 points: AA ×4, C ×4, CW ×4, Kʼ ×4, KW ×4, P ×4, Tʼ ×4, TSʼ ×4, XW ×4
- 4 points: KWʼ ×4, W ×4, QW ×3, UU ×2
- 5 points: QWʼ ×3, II ×2
- 7 points: Pʼ ×2
- 9 points: H ×2
- 11 points: 7 ×2

The letters B, D, E, F, G, J, O, R, V and Z are not used in Nuxalk and therefore have no tiles. The 7 is included in the set because it is an actual letter in Nuxalk. It is used to replace ' if you don't have a tile ending with '. Arguably H and 7 do not exist in Nuxalk, but they are included as they are used for borrowed words, or in the case of 7, optionally at the beginning of a word. Blanks do not exist in this game.

=== Occitan ===
Occitan letter distribution
	×1	×2	×3	×4	×6	×7	×8	×10	×15
0		[blank]							
1					O	I N T	R S	E	A
2			C	L M U					
4		B D P	G						
6	F H	V							
10	J Q X Z								

The Occitan-language edition, called "E-scrabbl'òc", uses these 102 tiles:

- 2 blank tiles (scoring 0 points)
- 1 point: A ×15, E ×10, R ×8, S ×8, I ×7, N ×7, T ×7, O ×6
- 2 points: L ×4, M ×4, U ×4, C ×3
- 4 points: G ×3, B ×2, D ×2, P ×2
- 6 points: V ×2, F ×1, H ×1
- 10 points: J ×1, Q ×1, X ×1, Z ×1

K, W, and Y are absent because they are only used in loanwords. It is unknown if blanks can be used to represent K, W, or Y.

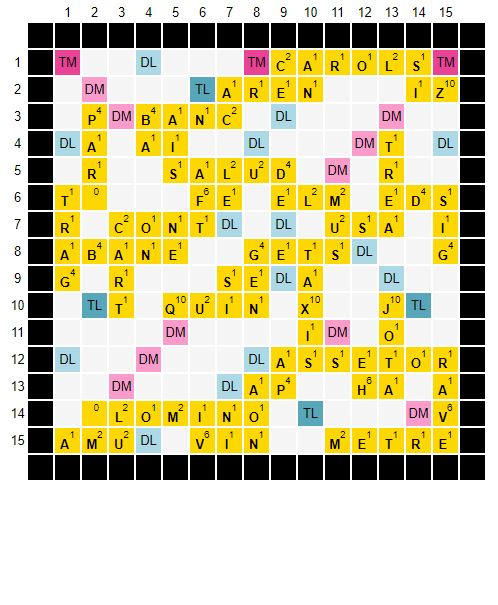
Completed Occitan Scrabble Board

=== Old Church Slavonic ===
Old Church Slavonic proposed distribution
	×1	×2	×3	×4	×5	×6	×7	×8	×9	×10
0		[blank]								
1						Н Р Т Ь	И О	Ъ	С	А
2				Л В К	Д Є					
3			М Ѣ Ѥ							
4		Б Г Ꙁ П Ꙑ								
5	Ж Ꙗ Ѩ									
6	Ц Ч Ѫ Ѧ									
7	Х У									
8	І Ш Ю									
9	Щ Ѡ									
10	Ꙃ Ф Ѭ Ѯ Ѱ Ѳ Ѵ									

There is no such thing as an Old Church Slavonic version of Scrabble.

- 2 blank tiles (worth 0 points)
- 1 point: А ×10, С ×9, Ъ ×8, И ×7, О ×7, Н ×6, Р ×6, Т ×6, Ь ×6
- 2 points: Д ×5, Є ×5, Л ×4, В ×4, К ×4
- 3 points: М ×3, Ѣ ×3, Ѥ ×3
- 4 points: Б ×2, Г ×2, Ꙁ ×2, П ×2, Ꙑ ×2
- 5 points: Ж ×1, Ꙗ ×1, Ѩ ×1
- 6 points: Ц ×1, Ч ×1, Ѫ ×1, Ѧ ×1
- 7 points: Х ×1, У ×1
- 8 points: І ×1, Ш ×1, Ю ×1
- 9 points: Щ ×1, Ѡ ×1
- 10 points: Ꙃ ×1, Ф ×1, Ѭ ×1, Ѯ ×1, Ѱ ×1, Ѳ ×1, Ѵ ×1

The letters Ѡ, Ѯ, Ѱ, Ѳ and Ѵ are only used as numerals and in Greek loanwords and optional when it comes to playing. Ѡ is only used in one native Slavic word - "ѡтъ" (from). У's high value is due to it only appearing after О and forming the digraph Ѹ, which has no tile and must be formed with two. Ꙃ and Ꙁ can also be represented by the more modern Ѕ and З respectively. Я is absent due to it being a shorthand form of Ꙗ. Ы is represented with its archaic form Ꙑ. Й is also absent due to being interchangeable with И until shortly after the Russian spelling reform of 1917, being a form of И and not an actual letter in its own right. Е and Э are also interchangeable with Є and its iotated form.

=== Persian ===
Persian letter distribution
	×1	×2	×3	×4	×6	×7	×8	×9
0		[blank]						
1			ﺏ ﺱ ک	ﺩ ﺵ ﻝ ﻭ ﻩ	ﺕ ﻥ	ﺭ ﻡ	ی	ﺍ
2		ﺯ ﻑ						
3		ﺝ ﺥ ﻕ						
4		پ ﺡ ﻉ گ						
6	آ چ ﺹ ﻁ ﻍ							
8	ﺫ ژ ﺽ							
10	ﺙ ﻅ							

Persian-language editions, which use Arabic letters, use the following 102 tiles:

- 2 blank tiles (scoring 0 points)
- 1 point: ﺍ ×9, ی ×8, ﺭ ×7, ﻡ ×7, ﺕ ×6, ﻥ ×6, ﺩ ×4, ﺵ ×4, ﻝ ×4, ﻭ ×4, ﻩ ×4, ﺏ ×3, ﺱ ×3, ک ×3
- 2 points: ﺯ ×2, ﻑ ×2
- 3 points: ﺝ ×2, ﺥ ×2, ﻕ ×2
- 4 points: پ ×2, ﺡ ×2, ﻉ ×2, گ ×2
- 6 points: آ ×1, چ ×1, ﺹ ×1, ﻁ ×1, ﻍ ×1
- 8 points: ﺫ ×1, ژ ×1, ﺽ ×1
- 10 points: ﺙ ×1, ﻅ ×1

Although Persian letters have up to four forms, Scrabble tiles use the isolated form. The pattern of using the isolated forms in composing words is also found in the Arabic Scrabble set and in Arabic crosswords and is one of the rare situations when Arabic letters are not connected to each other. This set was created by Scrabble3D.

=== Pinyin ===
PinyinPal letter distribution
	×1	×2	×3	×5	×6	×7	×8	×13
0		[blank]						
1					O	G H	U	A I N
2			Y Z	E				
3		C D J L S X						
4	B F M P Q T							
5	W							
8	K R							
10	V							

In the word game PinyinPal, a Pinyin version, these 100 tiles are used:

- 2 blank tiles (scoring 0 points)
- 1 point: A ×13, I ×13, N ×13, U ×8, G ×7, H ×7, O ×6
- 2 points: E ×5, Y ×3, Z ×3
- 3 points: C ×2, D ×2, J ×2, L ×2, S ×2, X ×2
- 4 points: B ×1, F ×1, M ×1, P ×1, Q ×1, T ×1
- 5 points: W ×1
- 8 points: K ×1, R ×1
- 10 points: V ×1

The V is used to represent Ü. Tone marks are ignored.

=== Serbian ===
Serbian letter distribution
	×1	×2	×3	×4	×5	×6	×8	×9	×11
0		[blank]							
1			Д	У	С Т	Н Р	Е О	И	А
2			Л П	В К М					
3		З Ј							
4		Б Г							
5	Њ Ц Ч Ш								
7	Ћ Х								
8	Ж Љ								
10	Ђ Ф Џ								

Serbian-language sets use these 102 tiles:

- 2 blank tiles (scoring 0 points)
- 1 point: А ×11, И ×9, Е ×8, О ×8, Н ×6, Р ×6, С ×5, Т ×5, У ×4, Д ×3
- 2 points: В ×4, К ×4, М ×4, Л ×3, П ×3
- 3 points: З ×2, Ј ×2
- 4 points: Б ×2, Г ×2
- 5 points: Њ ×1, Ц ×1, Ч ×1, Ш ×1
- 7 points: Ћ ×1, Х ×1,
- 8 points: Ж ×1, Љ ×1
- 10 points: Ђ ×1, Ф ×1, Џ ×1

=== Tagalog ===
Tagalog letter distribution
	×1	×3	×4	×5	×6	×7	×8	×9	×13	×17	×27
0		[blank]									
1						M S	L T	U	N	I	A
2					K O						
3				P							
4				B		G					
5		R	H	NG							
8		D E Y									
10	W										

Salitaan, an independently produced Tagalog language variant of Scrabble, uses these 155 tiles:

- 3 blank tiles (scoring 0 points)
- 1 point: A ×27, I ×17, N ×13, U ×9, L ×8, T ×8, M ×7, S ×7
- 2 points: K ×6, O ×6
- 3 points: P ×5
- 4 points: G ×7, B ×5
- 5 points: NG ×5, H ×4, R ×3
- 8 points: D ×3, E ×3, Y ×3
- 10 points: W ×1

The games uses the Abakada alphabet; hence the foreign letters of the present Filipino alphabet, C, F, J, Q, V, X, Z, and even Ñ, are absent. None of these letters can be played with a blank. N and G being played in place of NG is allowed.

=== Tamil ===
The Tamil language set designed by Sorkalam Innovations is played on a 17×17 board and uses 90 plastic tiles for vowels and consonants, 65 glass tiles for vowel signs each of which can be placed on top of consonants and 25 blank tiles made of glass each of which can be used for any Tamil letter, vowel sign or consonant. During each turn, a player plays with 8 plastic tiles, 6 glass tiles and 1 blank tile. The letter distribution is as follows:

Plastic tiles:

- 1 point: அ ×1, இ ×1, எ ×1, க ×5, ச ×5, ட ×5, த ×5, ப ×5, ம ×5, ய ×5, ர ×5, ல ×5, வ ×5, ன ×5
- 2 points: ஆ ×1, உ ×1, ஒ ×1, ண ×4, ந ×4, ள ×4, ற ×4

Tamil Scrabble letter distribution (Sorkalam)
	×1	×2	×3	×4	×5	×6	×8	×16	×25
0									[blank]
1	அ இ எ				க ச ட த ப ம ய ர ல வ ன			்	
2	ஆ உ ஒ			ண ந ள ற		ு	ா ி		
3	ஊ ஏ ஓ		ீ	ூ ெ ே ை					
4	ஈ ஐ	ங ஞ ழ	ொ ோ						
6		ௌ							
8	ஔ								
10	ஃ								

- 3 points: ஊ ×1, ஏ ×1, ஓ ×1
- 4 points: ஈ ×1, ஐ ×1, ங ×2, ஞ ×2, ழ ×2
- 8 points: ஔ ×1
- 10 points: ஃ ×1

Glass tiles:

- 25 blank tiles (scoring 0 points)
- 1 point: ் ×16
- 2 points: ா ×8, ி ×8, ு ×6
- 3 points: ீ ×3, ூ ×4, ெ ×4, ே ×4, ை ×4
- 4 points: ொ ×3, ோ ×3
- 6 points: ௌ ×2

Alternate designs in Scrabble3D which are played without glass tiles and tile overlaps have two sets: an easy version, which plays some combining vowel signs separately, and a difficult version, which plays all letters with vowel signs as individual tiles. The set for the easy version uses these 1000 tiles:

- 1 point: ா ×85, ெ ×24, ே ×22, ை ×35, க ×57, ச ×29, ட ×18, த ×48, ப ×36, ம ×25, ய ×18, ர ×28, ல ×17, வ ×31, ன ×12, ம் ×41, ல் ×26, ன் ×17, தி ×17, கு ×15, டு ×15, து ×10, ரு ×11
- 2 points: அ ×10, ந ×9, ள ×8, ற ×7, க் ×22, ட் ×15, த் ×23, ப் ×15, ர் ×13, ள் ×6, கி ×7, சி ×9, டி ×10, பி ×7, ரி ×8, வி ×10, பு ×10, று ×7
- 3 points: இ ×4, உ ×4, ங் ×8, ண் ×9, ந் ×8, ற் ×7, யி ×3, ளி ×3, மு ×6
- 4 points: ஆ ×3, எ ×2, ண ×7, ச் ×7, மி ×3, றி ×3, வு ×3
- 5 points: ஒ ×1, ழ ×3, ய் ×5, ழ் ×1, நி ×3, லி ×4, னி ×3, சு ×7
- 6 points: ணி ×3, ழி ×2, யு ×1, லு ×2, ழு ×2, ளு ×1
- 7 points: ஏ ×1, னு ×1, கூ ×2
- 8 points: ஐ ×1, ஞ் ×4, வ் ×1, நீ ×1, மீ ×1, வீ ×1, நூ ×1, பூ ×3, மூ ×2
- 9 points: ஈ ×1, ஊ ×1, ஓ ×1, கீ ×1, சீ ×1, தீ ×1, பீ ×1, ணு ×1, சூ ×1, தூ ×1, யூ ×1
- 10 points: ஃ ×1, ஞ ×1, டீ ×1, ணீ ×1, யீ ×1, ரீ ×1, லீ ×1, ளீ ×1, றீ ×1, னீ ×1, நு ×1, டூ ×1, ணூ ×1, ரூ ×1, லூ ×1, வூ ×1, ளூ ×1, றூ ×1, னூ ×1

The set for the difficult version uses these 1000 tiles:

- 1 point: க ×40, ச ×19, ட ×12, த ×42, ப ×23, ம ×17, ய ×14, ர ×23, வ ×20, ம் ×49, ர் ×16, ல் ×32, ன் ×20, கா ×13, தி ×20, கு ×17, டு ×18, து ×12, ரு ×13
- 2 points: அ ×11, ல ×10, ன ×9, க் ×26, ட் ×18, த் ×27, ப் ×18, ள் ×7, பா ×9, வா ×8, கி ×8, சி ×10, டி ×12, பி ×9, ரி ×10, வி ×12, பு ×12, று ×7
- 3 points: இ ×5, உ ×5, ள ×5, ங் ×10, ச் ×9, ண் ×10, ந் ×9, ற் ×8, தா ×7, சா ×6, மா ×6, சு ×8, மு ×7, கை ×5, டை ×6, லை ×6, கொ ×5
- 4 points: ஆ ×3, எ ×2, ண ×6, ந ×4, ற ×4, ய் ×5, நா ×4, யா ×4, ரா ×5, மி ×3, லி ×5, ளி ×4, றி ×3, வு ×3, செ ×3, வெ ×3
- 5 points: டா ×2, லா ×2, ணி ×4, நி ×3, யி ×3, ழி ×3, னி ×3, ழு ×3, வே ×2, ரை ×3, வை ×2, ளை ×2, பொ ×2, கோ ×3, போ ×3
- 6 points: ஒ ×1, ழ ×2, ஞ் ×4, ழ் ×1, பூ ×3, லு ×2, ளு ×1, கூ ×2, பெ ×2, தே ×2, சை ×2, தை ×2, மை ×2, றை ×2, னை ×2
- 7 points: ஏ ×1, னா ×1, சீ ×1, யு ×1, மூ ×1, தெ ×1, நெ ×1, சே ×1, பே ×1, மே ×1, ணை ×1, சொ ×1, தொ ×1, சோ ×1, தோ ×1
- 8 points: ஊ ×1, ணா ×1, தீ ×1, நீ ×1, மீ ×1, வீ ×1, னு ×1, தூ ×1, கெ ×1, மெ ×1, கே ×1, பை ×1, ழை ×1, மொ ×1, மோ ×1
- 9 points: ஈ ×1, ஓ ×1, வ் ×1, ஞா ×1, ளா×1, கீ ×1, பீ ×1, ணு ×1, சூ ×1, நூ ×1, நே ×1, நோ ×1, யோ ×1, ரோ ×1
- 10 points: ஐ ×1, ழா ×1, றா ×1, ரீ ×1, நு ×1, யூ ×1, ரூ ×1, யெ ×1, யே ×1, ரே ×1, லே ×1, யை ×1, நொ ×1, லோ ×1
- 11 points: ஞ ×1, டீ ×1, லீ ×1, னோ×1, கௌ ×1
- 12 points: ணீ ×1, யீ ×1, டூ ×1, சௌ×1, பௌ ×1
- 13 points: ஃ ×1, னீ ×1, ரெ ×1, லெ ×1, மௌ ×1
- 14 points: ஔ ×1, லூ ×1, டே ×1, ரொ ×1, டோ ×1
- 15 points: வூ ×1, னே ×1, நை ×1, வோ×1, தௌ ×1
- 16 points: ளூ ×1, னூ ×1, டெ ×1, ளெ ×1, வொ ×1
- 17 points: ணூ ×1, ணெ ×1, டொ ×1, ளோ×1, றோ ×1
- 18 points: ளீ ×1, றூ ×1, னெ ×1, லொ ×1, ணோ ×1
- 19 points: றீ ×1, ணே ×1, ளே ×1, றே ×1, யொ ×1
- 20 points: றெ ×1, ளொ ×1, றொ ×1, னொ ×1, வௌ ×1

This set of Tamil Scrabble is played on a 45×45 board (or a 15×15×15 board in 3D), and 20 tiles are on a rack at a time (but can be lowered to as low as 15 for experts). Note that ங, ஙா, ஙி, ஙீ, ஙு, ஙூ, ஙெ, ஙே, ஙை, ஙொ, ஙோ, ஙௌ, ஞி, ஞீ, ஞு, ஞூ, ஞெ, ஞே, ஞை, ஞொ, ஞோ, ஞௌ, டௌ, ணொ, ணௌ, நௌ, யௌ, ரௌ, லௌ, ழீ, ழூ, ழெ, ழே, ழொ, ழோ, ழௌ, ளௌ, றௌ and னௌ have no tiles because they are very rare in Tamil; these letters can still be played with a blank. Also, ஸ், ஸ, ஸா, ஸி, ஸீ, ஸு, ஸூ, ஸெ, ஸே, ஸை, ஸொ, ஸோ, ஸௌ, ஜ், ஜ, ஜா, ஜி, ஜீ, ஜு, ஜூ, ஜெ, ஜே, ஜை, ஜொ, ஜோ, ஜௌ, ஷ், ஷ, ஷா, ஷி, ஷீ, ஷு, ஷூ, ஷெ, ஷே, ஷை, ஷொ, ஷோ, ஷௌ, ஹ், ஹ, ஹா, ஹி, ஹீ, ஹு, ஹூ, ஹெ, ஹே, ஹை, ஹொ, ஹோ, ஹௌ, க்ஷ், க்ஷ, க்ஷா, க்ஷி, க்ஷீ, க்ஷு, க்ஷூ, க்ஷெ, க்ஷே, க்ஷை, க்ஷொ, க்ஷோ, க்ஷௌ and ஶ்ரீ have no tiles because these are only used in Sanskrit loanwords; these letters can still be played with a blank. ஶ், ஶ, ஶா, ஶி, ஶீ, ஶு, ஶூ, ஶெ, ஶே, ஶை, ஶொ, ஶோ and ஶௌ have no tiles because these are only used in very few Sanskrit loanwords, but can still be played with a blank. Tamil Scrabble can be also played with smaller boards with smaller letter sets (with as low as 15 tiles on the rack, depending on the set) or with larger boards with larger letter sets.

Tamil Scrabble letter distribution (Scrabble3D)
	×1	×2	×3	×4	×5	×6	×7	×8	×9	×11	×16
1		ன து ரு	ட ய ல ன் தி கு டு	ெ ே ம	ச ர ல்	வ	ை ப	ம்	த	க	ா
2	அ ந ள ற ள் கி சி பி ரி று	ட் ப் ர் டி வி பு	க் த்								
3	இ உ ங் ண் ந் ற் யி ளி மு										
4	ஆ எ ண ச் மி றி வு										
5	ஒ ழ ய் ழ் நி லி னி சு										
6	ணி ழி யு லு ழு ளு										
7	ஏ னு கூ										
8	ஐ ஞ் வ் நீ மீ வீ நூ பூ மூ										
9	ஈ ஊ ஓ கீ சீ தீ பீ ணு சூ தூ										
10	ஞ நு										

A smaller set of the easy version in Scrabble3D which is played on a 21×21 board, but without including some of the rarely used Tamil letters uses these 200 tiles:

- 1 point: ா ×16, ெ ×4, ே ×4, ை ×7, க ×11, ச ×5, ட ×3, த ×9, ப ×7, ம ×4, ய ×3, ர ×5, ல ×3, வ ×6, ன ×2, ம் ×8, ல் ×5, ன் ×3, தி ×3, கு ×3, டு ×3, து ×2, ரு ×2
- 2 points: அ ×1, ந ×1, ள ×1, ற ×1, க் ×3, ட் ×2, த் ×3, ப் ×2, ர் ×2, ள் ×1, கி ×1, சி ×1, டி ×2, பி ×1, ரி ×1, வி ×2, பு ×2, று ×1
- 3 points: இ ×1, உ ×1, ங் ×1, ண் ×1, ந் ×1, ற் ×1, யி ×1, ளி ×1, மு ×1
- 4 points: ஆ ×1, எ ×1, ண ×1, ச் ×1, மி ×1, றி ×1, வு ×1
- 5 points: ஒ ×1, ழ ×1, ய் ×1, ழ் ×1, நி ×1, லி ×1, னி ×1, சு ×1
- 6 points: ணி ×1, ழி ×1, யு ×1, லு ×1, ழு ×1, ளு ×1
- 7 points: ஏ ×1, னு ×1, கூ ×1
- 8 points: ஐ ×1, ஞ் ×1, வ் ×1, நீ ×1, மீ ×1, வீ ×1, நூ ×1, பூ ×1, மூ ×1
- 9 points: ஈ ×1, ஊ ×1, ஓ ×1, கீ ×1, சீ ×1, தீ ×1, பீ ×1, ணு ×1, சூ ×1, தூ ×1
- 10 points: ஞ ×1, நு ×1

=== Thai ===
Thai Scrabble sets, which are called Khum Khom (คำคม), uses these 104 tiles. Note that the slashed tiles can be used for one of the two following letters:

- 4 blank tiles (scoring 0 points)
- 1 point: ะ x6, า x5, เ x5, ก x4, ง x3, ด x3, น x3, บ x3, ม x3, ย x3, ล x3, ร x3, ว x3, อ x3
- 2 points: แ x4, โ x3, ค x2, จ x2, ท x2, ำ x2, ไ x2, ใ x2
- 3 points: ส x3, ข x2, ช x2, ต x2, ป x2, พ x2, ผ x1
- 4 points: ฟ x2, ห x2, ถ x1, ฝ x1
- 5 points: ธ x1
- 6 points: ฆ/ซ x1, ฉ x1, ฐ/ฑ x1, ศ/ฤ x1, ฮ/ฦ x1
- 7 points: ฎ/ฏ x1, ฒ/ฌ x1, ภ x1
- 8 points: ณ/ษ x1, ฬ/ญ x1

There are also tiles for tone marks and all the other vowel marks that score zero points.

=== Tswana ===
Tswana letter distribution
	×1	×2	×3	×4	×5	×6	×7	×10	×12	×16
0		[blank]								
1						G N T	L	O	E	A
2					I S					
3				K M						
5		D W	B H R							
8	F P U Y									
10	J Š									

The Tswana editions use these 102 tiles:

- 2 blank tiles (scoring 0 points)
- 1 point: A ×16, E ×12, O ×10, L ×7, G ×6, N ×6, T ×6
- 2 points: I ×5, S ×5
- 3 points: K ×4, M ×4
- 5 points: B ×3, H ×3, R ×3, D ×2, W ×2
- 8 points: F ×1, P ×1, U ×1, Y ×1
- 10 points: J ×1, Š ×1

The letters C, Q, V, X, and Z have no tiles as these letters are rarely used in Tswana. However, they can still be played with a blank. Note that Ê and Ô have no tiles because these are now usually written without the circumflex.

Tswana letter distribution (old)
	×1	×2	×3	×4	×5	×6	×9	×11	×12	×16
0		[blank]								
1					S	G N T	L	O	E	A
2					I					
3				K M						
4			B							
5		D W	H R							
8	F P U Y									
10	J									

Prior to December 4, 2016, Tswana versions used a slightly different set using 104 tiles. There was no Š tile, there were 11 O's and 9 L's, the S was worth only 1 point, and the B was worth only 4 points.

=== Tuvan ===
Tuvan letter distribution
	×1	×2	×3	×4	×5	×6	×7	×8	×12
0	[blank]								
1				И У	Г К Т	Д Е Л	Н	Р Ы	А
2		Ш	М О П С Ү Ч						
3		АА Б З Й Ң Э							
4	В Ж Ө Х ЭЭ								
5	ОО УУ ЫЫ Я								
6	ИИ ӨӨ ҮҮ								
8	Ъ								
10	Ё Ю								

Tuvan-language Scrabble sets, which use Cyrillic letters, use these 125 tiles:

- 1 blank tile (scoring 0 points)
- 1 hyphen tile (scoring 0 points)
- 1 point: А ×12, Р ×8, Ы ×8, Н ×7, Д ×6, Е ×6, Л ×6, Г ×5, К ×5, Т ×5, И ×4, У ×4
- 2 points: М ×3, О ×3, П ×3, С ×3, Ү ×3, Ч ×3, Ш ×2
- 3 points: АА ×2, Б ×2, З ×2, Й ×2, Ң ×2, Э ×2
- 4 points: В ×1, Ж ×1, Ө ×1, Х ×1, ЭЭ ×1
- 5 points: ОО ×1, УУ ×1, ЫЫ ×1, Я ×1
- 6 points: ИИ ×1, ӨӨ ×1, ҮҮ ×1
- 8 points: Ъ ×1
- 10 points: Ё ×1, Ю ×1

The distribution lacks four letters used only in loanwords: Ф, Ц, Щ, and Ь.

=== Vietnamese ===
Vietnamese letter distribution
	×1	×2	×3	×4	×5	×6	×7	×13	×14	×20
0						[blank]				
1	Á À Ã Ạ Ả Ă Ắ Ằ Ẳ Ặ Ẵ Â Ấ Ầ Ẩ Ậ Ẫ É È Ẻ Ẹ Ẽ Ê Ề Ế Ể Ệ Ễ Í Ì Ĩ Ỉ Ị Ó Ò Ỏ Ọ Õ Ô Ố Ồ Ổ Ộ Ỗ Ơ Ớ Ờ Ở Ợ Ỡ Ú Ù Ủ Ụ Ũ Ư Ứ Ừ Ử Ự Ữ Ý Ỳ Ỹ Ỷ Ỵ						A E I O U	T	H	N
2							C G M			
4					B D Đ L					
5			P R	K						
8		S X Y								
10		Q V								

A Vietnamese online board game, called Vietboard, uses these 209 tiles:

- 6 blank tiles (scoring 0 points)
- 1 point: N ×20, H ×14, T ×13, A ×6, E ×6, I ×6, O ×6, U ×6, Á ×1, À ×1, Ã ×1, Ạ ×1, Ả ×1, Ă ×1, Ắ ×1, Ằ ×1, Ẳ ×1, Ặ ×1, Ẵ ×1, Â ×1, Ấ ×1, Ầ ×1, Ẩ ×1, Ậ ×1, Ẫ ×1, É ×1, È ×1, Ẻ ×1, Ẹ ×1, Ẽ ×1, Ê ×1, Ề ×1, Ế ×1, Ể ×1, Ệ ×1, Ễ ×1, Í ×1, Ì ×1, Ĩ ×1, Ỉ ×1, Ị ×1, Ó ×1, Ò ×1, Ỏ ×1, Ọ ×1, Õ ×1, Ô ×1, Ố ×1, Ồ ×1, Ổ ×1, Ộ ×1, Ỗ ×1, Ơ ×1, Ớ ×1, Ờ ×1, Ở ×1, Ợ ×1, Ỡ ×1, Ú ×1, Ù ×1, Ủ ×1, Ụ ×1, Ũ ×1, Ư ×1, Ứ ×1, Ừ ×1, Ử ×1, Ự ×1, Ữ ×1, Ý ×1, Ỳ ×1, Ỹ ×1, Ỷ ×1, Ỵ ×1
- 2 points: C ×7, G ×7, M ×7
- 4 points: B ×5, D ×5, Đ ×5, L ×5
- 5 points: K ×4, P ×3, R ×3
- 8 points: S ×2, X ×2, Y ×2
- 10 points: Q ×2, V ×2

In this game, 8 tiles are on a rack instead of the standard 7.

Another Vietnamese board game based on Scrabble, called "Cờ Ô Chữ", released in 2022, contains these tiles:

- 3 blank tiles (scoring 0 points)
- 1 point: A ×7, I ×6, C ×4, N ×4, O ×4, T ×4, U ×3, G ×2, H ×2
- 2 points: NG ×8, NH ×5, CH ×3, Ê ×3, M ×3, Ô ×3, TH ×2, GH ×1, GI ×1, IA ×1, UA ×1
- 3 points: Â ×2, Ð x2, IÊ ×2, L ×2, Ơ x2, Ư ×2, Y ×2, NGH ×1, UÔ ×1
- 4 points: Ă ×2, B ×2, E ×2, R ×2, V ×2, K ×1, ƯA ×1
- 5 points: S ×2, KH ×1, P ×1, TR ×1
- 6 points: ƯƠ ×2, PH ×1, UYÊ ×1
- 8 points: D ×1
- 9 points: QU ×1
- 10 points: X ×1

Note that there are tiles for digraphs, trigraphs, diphthongs, and triphthongs, and also glass tiles for the tone marks: 1 point for the acute accent (Dau Sac), 2 points for the grave accent (Dau Huyen), 3 points for the dot below (Dau Nang), 4 points for the hook (Dau Hoi), and 5 points for the tilde (Dau Nga). All distributions lack F, J, W, and Z because these letters are not used in Vietnamese.

=== Volapük ===
Volapük letter distribution
	×1	×2	×3	×4	×5	×6	×8	×10
0		[blank]						
1					O	S	L I E	N A
2				D M T Ä				
3		B F P	Ö U					
4		Ü K R						
5	V Y							
6	C G							
8	Z H							
10	J							

Volapük language sets use these 90 tiles:

- 2 blank tiles (worth 0 points)
- 1 point: N ×10, A ×10, I ×8, E ×8, L ×8, S ×6, O ×5
- 2 points: D ×4, M ×4, T ×4, Ä ×4
- 3 points: Ö ×3, U ×3, B ×2, F ×2, P ×2
- 4 points: Ü ×2, K ×2, R ×2
- 5 points: V ×1, Y ×1
- 6 points: C ×1, G ×1
- 8 points: Z ×1, H ×1
- 10 points: J ×1

The letters Q, W and X have no tiles due to their infrequency in Volapük, but they can be played with a blank. The alternate forms Ꞛ, Ꞝ and Ꞟ are replaced by Ä, Ö and Ü respectively.

=== Zhuyin ===
Zhuyin letter distribution
	×1	×2	×3	×4	×5	×8	×10	×13
0		[blank]						
1							ㄨ	ㄧ
4					ㄜ ㄢ ㄥ	ㄉ		
5			ㄣ	ㄐ ㄚ ㄠ				
6		ㄅ ㄒ ㄓ ㄩ ㄟ ㄤ	ㄊ ㄌ ㄏ ㄕ					
7	ㄞ	ㄍ ㄛ ㄡ						
8	ㄇ ㄋ ㄑ ㄖ ㄗ ㄝ							

Zhuyin Chinese-language editions of Scrabble use these 100 tiles:

- 2 blank tiles (scoring 0 points)
- 1 point: ㄧ (I) ×13, ㄨ (U) ×10
- 4 points: ㄉ (D) ×8, ㄜ (E) ×5, ㄢ (AN) ×5, ㄥ (ENG) ×5,
- 5 points: ㄐ (J) ×4, ㄚ (A) ×4, ㄠ (AO) ×4, ㄣ (EN) ×3
- 6 points: ㄊ (T) ×3, ㄌ (L) ×3, ㄏ (H) ×3, ㄕ (SH) ×3, ㄅ (B) ×2, ㄒ (X) ×2, ㄓ (ZH) ×2, ㄩ (Ü) ×2, ㄟ (EI) ×2, ㄤ (ANG) ×2
- 7 points: ㄍ (G) ×2, ㄛ (O) ×2, ㄡ (OU) ×2, ㄞ (AI) ×1
- 8 points: ㄇ (M) ×1, ㄋ (N) ×1, ㄑ (Q) ×1, ㄖ (R) ×1, ㄗ (Z) ×1, ㄝ (Ê) ×1

The letters ㄘ (C), ㄔ (CH), ㄈ (F), ㄎ (K), ㄆ (P), and ㄙ (S) are used in Zhuyin, but so infrequently that they have no tiles.
