= Ye with circumflex =

Cyrillic letter

Ye with Circumflex
- Е̂ е̂
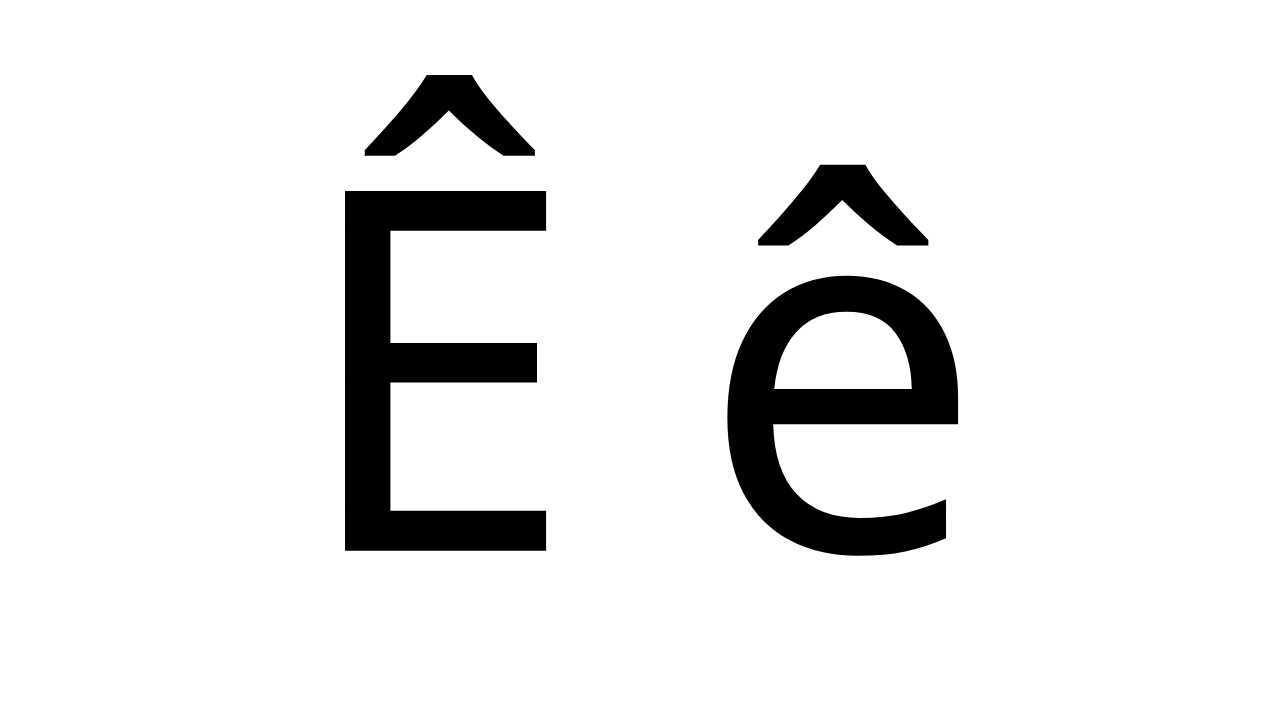

Usage
- Writing system: Cyrillic
- Type: Alphabetic

Ye with circumflex (Е̂ е̂; italics: Е̂ е̂) is a letter in the Cyrillic Script, which represents the Cyrillic letter Ye (Е е) with a circumflex accent. This letter has the exact same look as the Latin letter E with Circumflex (Ê, ê).

== Usage ==
M. O. Maksymovych proposed new letters for usage in the Ukrainian Alphabet, based on the etymological principles of spelling to preserve the old writing of Ukrainian. Of the letters proposed Е̂ was one of them.

This letter is also used in some dialects of Bulgarian and Serbian (плèте̂мо or клàде̂).

It is also found in the northern dialect of Udege.

== Computing codes ==
Being a relatively recent letter, not present in any legacy 8-bit Cyrillic encoding, the letter Е̂ is not represented directly by a precomposed character in Unicode either; it has to be composed as Е+◌̂ (U+0302).

Character information
Preview	Е		е		̂	
Unicode name	CYRILLIC CAPITAL LETTER IE		CYRILLIC SMALL LETTER IE		COMBINING CIRCUMFLEX ACCENT	
Encodings	decimal	hex	dec	hex	dec	hex
Unicode	1045	U+0415	1077	U+0435	770	U+0302
UTF-8	208 149	D0 95	208 181	D0 B5	204 130	CC 82
Numeric character reference	&#1045;	&#x415;	&#1077;	&#x435;	&#770;	&#x302;
Named character reference	&IEcy;		&iecy;			

== Related letters and other similar characters ==
- Ё ё : Cyrillic letter Yo
- Є є : Cyrillic letter Ukrainian Ye
- Ԑ ԑ : Cyrillic letter Reversed Ze
- Э э : Cyrillic letter E
- E e : Latin letter E
- Ê ê : Latin letter Ê - a Gagauz, Kurdish, Podlachian, and Vietnamese letter
- Ѐ è : Cyrillic letter Ye with Grave
