= He (letter) =

Fifth letter of many Semitic alphabets

← Dalet He Waw →
- Phoenician: 𐤄
- Hebrew: ה
- Samaritan: ࠄ
- Aramaic: 𐡄
- Syriac: ܗ
- Nabataean: 𐢇𐢆
- Arabic: ه
- South Arabian: 𐩠
- Geʽez: ሀ
- North Arabian: 𐪀
- Ugaritic: 𐎅
- Phonemic representation: h, (ʔ)
- Position in alphabet: 5
- Numerical value: 5

Alphabetic derivatives of the Phoenician
- Greek: Ε
- Latin: E
- Cyrillic: Е, Є, Э, Ҩ

He is the fifth letter of the Semitic abjads, including Phoenician hē 𐤄, Hebrew hē ה, Aramaic hē 𐡄, Syriac hē ܗ, and Arabic hāʾ ه. It is also related to the Ancient North Arabian 𐪀, South Arabian 𐩠, and Ge'ez ሀ. Its sound value is the voiceless glottal fricative ([h]).

The proto-Canaanite letter gave rise to the Greek Epsilon Ε ε, Etruscan 𐌄, Latin E, Ë and Ɛ, and Cyrillic Е, Ё, Є, Э, and Ҩ. He, like all Phoenician letters, represented a consonant, but the Latin, Greek and Cyrillic equivalents have all come to represent vowel sounds.

== Origins ==
In Proto-Northwest Semitic there were still three voiceless fricatives: uvular ḫ [χ], glottal h [h], and pharyngeal ḥ [ħ]. In the Wadi el-Hol script, these appear to be expressed by derivatives of the following Egyptian hieroglyphs

V28

ḫayt "thread",

A28

hillul "jubilation", compare South Arabian h, ḥ, ḫ, Ge'ez ሀ, ሐ, ኀ, and

O6

ḥasir "court".

In the Phoenician alphabet, ḫayt and ḥasir are merged into Heth "fence", while hillul is replaced by He "window".

== Arabic hāʾ ==
Hāʾ هاء
- ه

Usage
- Writing system: Arabic script
- Type: Abjad
- Language of origin: Arabic language
- Sound values: h
- Alphabetical position: 26

History
- Development: 𐤄: 𐡄; 𐢆 ,𐢇; ه

Other
- Writing direction: Right-to-left

The letter is named hāʾ. It is written in several ways depending on its position in the word:

Position in word:	Isolated	Final	Medial	Initial
Glyph form: (Help)	ه	ـه	ـهـ	هـ

Hāʾ is used as a suffix (with the harakat dictated by ʾIʿrab) indicating possession, indicating that the noun marked with the suffix belongs to a specific masculine possessor; for example, كِتَاب kitāb ("book") becomes كِتَابُهُ kitābuhu ('his book') with the addition of final hāʾ; the possessor is implied in the suffix. A longer example, هُوَ يَقْرَأُ كِتَابَهُ, (huwa yaqraʼu kitābahu, "he reads his book") more clearly indicates the possessor. Hāʾ is also used as the Arabic abbreviation for dates following the Islamic era AH. The medial form of hāʾ resembles either the number 8 or the wings of a butterfly. The letter hāʾ, especially its isolated form, is informally written as the initial form of the letter itself.

The hāʾ suffix appended to a verb represents a masculine object (e.g. يَقْرَأُهُ, yaqraʾuhu, 'he reads it').

The feminine form of this construction is in both cases ـهَا -hā.

=== Variants ===
In Nastaʿlīq the letter has a variant, gol he, with its own particular shapes. As Urdu and other languages of Pakistan (as well as a few in India, like Kashmiri and Shina as well) are usually written in Nastaʿlīq, they normally employ this variant, which is given an independent code point (U+06C1) for compatibility:

Position in word:	Isolated	Final	Medial	Initial
Naskh glyph form: (Help)	ہ	ـہ	ـہـ	ہـ
Nastaliq glyph form:	ہ	ــــہ	ــــہــــ	ہــــ

For aspiration and breathy voice Urdu and other languages of India (Kashmiri, etc.) Pakistan (Shahmukhi for Punjabi and Saraiki, etc.) use the medial (in Nastaliq script) or initial (in Naskh script) form of hāʾ, called in Urdu do cashmī he ('two-eyed he'):

Position in word:	Isolated	Final	Medial	Initial
Naskh glyph form: (Help)	ھ	ـھ	ـھـ	ھـ
Nastaliq glyph form:	ھ	ــــھ	ــــھــــ	ھــــ

Several Turkic languages of Central Asia like Uyghur as well as Kurdish also use this letter for fricative /h/.

==== Arabic ae ====
Many Turkic languages of Central Asia, like Uyghur as well as Kurdish, use the modification of the letter for front vowels /æ/ or /ɛ/. This has its own code point (U+06D5). To distinguish it from Arabic hāʾ /h/, the letter lacks its initial and medial forms:

Position in word:	Isolated	Final	Medial	Initial
Glyph form: (Help)	ە	ـە	ـە	ە

By contrast, the letter used for /h/, appearing in loanwords, uses only the initial and medial forms of the Arabic hāʾ, even in isolated and final positions. In Unicode, U+06BE ھ ARABIC LETTER HEH DOACHASHMEE is used for this purpose.

Position in word	Isolated	Final	Medial	Initial
Glyph form: (Help)	ھ	ـھ	ـھـ	ھـ

Example words in Uyghur include شاھ (shah), a loanword from Persian, and سۈلھ (sülh), a loanword from Arabic.

== Hebrew he ==
Orthographic variants
Various print fonts			Cursive Hebrew	Solitreo	Rashi script
Serif	Sans-serif	Monospaced	Cursive Hebrew	Solitreo	Rashi script
ה	ה	ה			

Hebrew spelling: הֵא

=== Pronunciation ===
In modern Hebrew, the letter represents a voiceless glottal fricative /h/, and may also be dropped, although this pronunciation is seen as substandard.

Also, in many variant Hebrew pronunciations, the letter may represent a glottal stop. In word-final position, Hei is often used to indicate an a-vowel, usually that of qamatz ( ָ ), and in this sense functions like Aleph, Vav, and Yud as a mater lectionis, indicating the presence of a long vowel. However, it may also be used to indicate the sounds /e/ or /o/, as in עוֹשֶׂה (/ose/, 'makes') or פֹּה (/po/, 'here').

Hei, along with Aleph, Ayin, Reish, and Chet, cannot receive a dagesh. Nonetheless, it does receive a marking identical to the dagesh, to form Hei-mappiq (הּ). Although indistinguishable for most modern speakers or readers of Hebrew, the mapiq is placed in a word-final Hei to indicate that the letter is not merely a mater lectionis but that the consonant should be aspirated in that position. It is generally used in Hebrew to indicate the third-person feminine singular genitive marker. Today, such a pronunciation only occurs in religious contexts and even then often only by careful readers of the scriptures.

=== Significance of He ===
In gematria, He symbolizes the number five, and when used at the beginning of Hebrew years, it means 5000 (e.g. התשנ״ד in numbers would be the date 5754).

Attached to words, He may have three possible meanings:

- A preposition meaning the definite article "the", or the relative pronouns 'that', or 'who' (as in 'a boy who reads'). For example, yeled, 'a boy'; hayeled, 'the boy'.
- A prefix indicating that the sentence is a question. (For example, yadata, 'You knew'; Hayadata?, 'Did you know?')
- A suffix after place names indicating movement towards the given noun. (For example, Yerushalayim, 'Jerusalem'; Yerushalaymah, 'towards Jerusalem'.)

In modern Hebrew, the frequency of the usage of hei, out of all the letters, is 8.18%.

He, representing five in gematria, is often found on amulets, symbolizing the five fingers of a hand, a very common talismanic symbol.

==== In Judaism ====
He is often used to represent the name of God as an abbreviation for Hashem, which means The Name and is a way of saying God without actually saying the name of God (YHWH). In print, Hashem is usually written as Hei with a geresh: ה׳.

== Syriac heh ==
Heh
Madnḫaya Heh
Serṭo Heh
Esṭrangela Heh

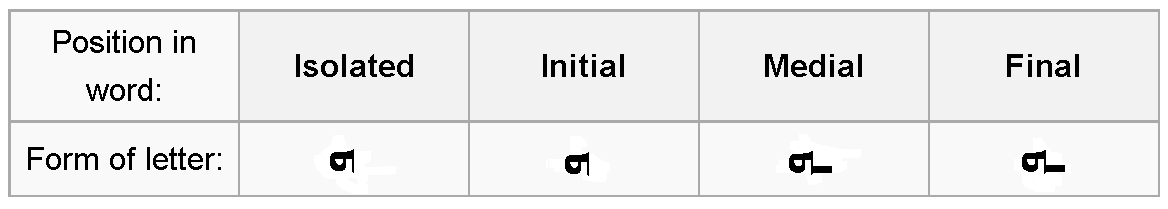

In the Syriac alphabet, the fifth letter is ܗ — Heh (ܗܹܐ). It is pronounced as an [h]. At the end of a word with a point above it, it represents the third-person feminine singular suffix. Without the point, it stands for the masculine equivalent. Standing alone with a horizontal line above it, it is the abbreviation for either hānoh (ܗܵܢܘܿ), meaning 'this is' or 'that is', or halelûya (ܗܵܠܹܠܘܼܝܵܐ). As a numeral, He represents the number five.

== Character encodings ==
Character information
Preview	ה		ه		ھ		ہ		ە		ܗ		ࠄ		ࡄ		ሀ	
Unicode name	HEBREW LETTER HE		ARABIC LETTER HEH		ARABIC LETTER HEH DOACHASHMEE		ARABIC LETTER HEH GOAL		ARABIC LETTER AE		SYRIAC LETTER HE		SAMARITAN LETTER IY		MANDAIC LETTER AH		ETHIOPIC SYLLABLE HA	
Encodings	decimal	hex	dec	hex	dec	hex	dec	hex	dec	hex	dec	hex	dec	hex	dec	hex	dec	hex
Unicode	1492	U+05D4	1607	U+0647	1726	U+06BE	1729	U+06C1	1749	U+06D5	1815	U+0717	2052	U+0804	2116	U+0844	4608	U+1200
UTF-8	215 148	D7 94	217 135	D9 87	218 190	DA BE	219 129	DB 81	219 149	DB 95	220 151	DC 97	224 160 132	E0 A0 84	224 161 132	E0 A1 84	225 136 128	E1 88 80
Numeric character reference	&#1492;	&#x5D4;	&#1607;	&#x647;	&#1726;	&#x6BE;	&#1729;	&#x6C1;	&#1749;	&#x6D5;	&#1815;	&#x717;	&#2052;	&#x804;	&#2116;	&#x844;	&#4608;	&#x1200;

Character information
Preview	𐎅		𐡄		𐡤		𐢇		𐣤		𐤄		𐩠		𐪀		𐿤	
Unicode name	UGARITIC LETTER HO		IMPERIAL ARAMAIC LETTER HE		PALMYRENE LETTER HE		NABATAEAN LETTER HE		HATRAN LETTER HE		PHOENICIAN LETTER HE		OLD SOUTH ARABIAN LETTER HE		OLD NORTH ARABIAN LETTER HEH		ELYMAIC LETTER HE	
Encodings	decimal	hex	dec	hex	dec	hex	dec	hex	dec	hex	dec	hex	dec	hex	dec	hex	dec	hex
Unicode	66437	U+10385	67652	U+10844	67684	U+10864	67719	U+10887	67812	U+108E4	67844	U+10904	68192	U+10A60	68224	U+10A80	69604	U+10FE4
UTF-8	240 144 142 133	F0 90 8E 85	240 144 161 132	F0 90 A1 84	240 144 161 164	F0 90 A1 A4	240 144 162 135	F0 90 A2 87	240 144 163 164	F0 90 A3 A4	240 144 164 132	F0 90 A4 84	240 144 169 160	F0 90 A9 A0	240 144 170 128	F0 90 AA 80	240 144 191 164	F0 90 BF A4
UTF-16	55296 57221	D800 DF85	55298 56388	D802 DC44	55298 56420	D802 DC64	55298 56455	D802 DC87	55298 56548	D802 DCE4	55298 56580	D802 DD04	55298 56928	D802 DE60	55298 56960	D802 DE80	55299 57316	D803 DFE4
Numeric character reference	&#66437;	&#x10385;	&#67652;	&#x10844;	&#67684;	&#x10864;	&#67719;	&#x10887;	&#67812;	&#x108E4;	&#67844;	&#x10904;	&#68192;	&#x10A60;	&#68224;	&#x10A80;	&#69604;	&#x10FE4;

Character information
Preview	𐫆		𐭄		𐭤		𐮄		𐼅		𐼳		𐾵	
Unicode name	MANICHAEAN LETTER HE		INSCRIPTIONAL PARTHIAN LETTER HE		INSCRIPTIONAL PAHLAVI LETTER HE		PSALTER PAHLAVI LETTER HE		OLD SOGDIAN LETTER HE		SOGDIAN LETTER HE		CHORASMIAN LETTER HE	
Encodings	decimal	hex	dec	hex	dec	hex	dec	hex	dec	hex	dec	hex	dec	hex
Unicode	68294	U+10AC6	68420	U+10B44	68452	U+10B64	68484	U+10B84	69381	U+10F05	69427	U+10F33	69557	U+10FB5
UTF-8	240 144 171 134	F0 90 AB 86	240 144 173 132	F0 90 AD 84	240 144 173 164	F0 90 AD A4	240 144 174 132	F0 90 AE 84	240 144 188 133	F0 90 BC 85	240 144 188 179	F0 90 BC B3	240 144 190 181	F0 90 BE B5
UTF-16	55298 57030	D802 DEC6	55298 57156	D802 DF44	55298 57188	D802 DF64	55298 57220	D802 DF84	55299 57093	D803 DF05	55299 57139	D803 DF33	55299 57269	D803 DFB5
Numeric character reference	&#68294;	&#x10AC6;	&#68420;	&#x10B44;	&#68452;	&#x10B64;	&#68484;	&#x10B84;	&#69381;	&#x10F05;	&#69427;	&#x10F33;	&#69557;	&#x10FB5;
