= ORFO =

Spelling checker

- Developer: Informatic LLC
- Stable release: ORFO 2016
- Operating system: Microsoft Windows, MacOS, Linux
- Type: Spell checker, Grammar checker
- License: Proprietary software
- Website: www.orfo.ru

ORFO (Russian: «ОРФО») is one of the oldest and most popular programs in the Russian spelling. It also provides grammar check and style, makes autosummary of document, shows definition of word, displays possible synonyms and antonyms of the given word. It is developed by the Russian company Informatic LLC.

Since 1995 Informatic spell-checking modules are licensed by Microsoft Corp. and incorporated into Localized Russian MS Office until 2010. Since the version of Microsoft Office 2010, developer has abandoned the use of embedded ORFO in the office suite.

There is free online version of ORFO available.

ORFO was also mentioned in 2003 Technical Guidelines for United Nations Internet Publishing.

ORFO has full support for the Cyrillic letter Yo ⟨Ё⟩.

== Supported products ==
Another popular company PROMT uses ORFO in its translation products.

Ritlabs has supported ORFO in its product The Bat! since 2014.

ORFO also supports LibreOffice.

== Available languages ==
ORFO supports 8 languages: Russian, Ukrainian, English, German, French, Portuguese, Spanish, and Italian.

== See also ==
- Yo
- Yoficator
- Hunspell
