= Ukrainian Ye =

Сharacter of the Cyrillic script

Ukrainian Ye, єсть
- Є є

Usage
- Writing system: Cyrillic
- Type: Alphabetic
- Language of origin: Ukrainian language, Old Church Slavonic, Khanty languages
- Sound values: [je], [jɛ], [ɤ], [ɛ]

History
- Development: Ε ε: Е е; Є є
- Descendants: Э э

Other
- Associated numbers: 5 (Cyrillic numerals)

Ukrainian Ye or Round Ye (Є є; italics: Є є) is a character of the Cyrillic script. It is a separate letter in the Ukrainian alphabet, the Pannonian Rusyn alphabet, and both the Carpathian Rusyn alphabets; in all of these, it comes directly after Е. It can also be found in the writing of the Khanty language. In modern Church Slavonic, it is considered a variant form of Ye (Е е) (there, the selection of Є and Е is driven by orthography rules). Until the mid-19th century, Є/є was also used in Romanian and Serbian. Other modern Slavonic languages may use Є/є shapes instead of Е/е for decorative purposes. Then, the letter is usually referred to by the older name Yest (which also refers to the conventional Ye). If the two need to be distinguished, the descriptive name Broad E is sometimes used (in contrast with "Narrow E").

In Ukrainian, Є/є commonly represents the sound /je/ or /jɛ/ like the pronunciation of ⟨ye⟩ in "yes". (See usage for more detail.)

Ukrainian Ye is romanized as ⟨je⟩, ⟨ê⟩, or even ⟨e⟩. See scientific transliteration of Cyrillic.

Э is graphically a backwards Ukrainian Ye.

== History ==
Letter Є/є was derived from one of the variant forms of Cyrillic Ye (Е е), known as "broad E" or "anchor E". Є-shaped letters can be found in late uncial (ustav) and semi-uncial (poluustav) Cyrillic manuscripts, especially ones of Ukrainian origin. Typically it corresponds to the letter Iotated E (Ѥ ѥ) of older monuments. Certain old primers and grammar books of Church Slavonic language had listed Є/є as a letter distinct from Е/е and placed it near the end of the alphabet (the exact alphabet position varies). Among modern-style Cyrillic scripts (known as "civil script" or "Petrine script"), Є/є was first used in Serbian books (end of the 18th century and first half of the 19th century); sometimes, Serbian printers might be using Э/э instead of Є/є due to font availability.

In the modern Ukrainian language, Є/є has been used since 1837 (orthography of almanach "Русалка Днѣстровая" (Rusalka Dnistrovaya)). In Cyrillic numerals, Є is always preferred to E to represent 5.

== Usage ==
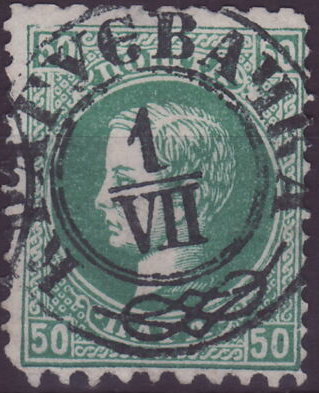
Serbian postage stamp from 1869, cancelled in Kragujevac, with є used to spell "је".

=== Ukrainian and Rusyn ===
In Ukrainian and Rusyn, Є/є represents the sound combination /je/ or the vowel sound /e/ after a palatalized consonant.

It is the 8th letter of Ukrainian alphabet (in 1935-1992 it was the 7th, as Ґ was removed).

=== Khanty ===
In Khanty, the letter represents the sound /je/.

=== Old Serbian ===
In old Serbian orthography, Є/є represented same sounds as in Ukrainian and Rusyn: the sound combination /je/ or the vowel sound /e/ after a palatalized consonant.

The letter was eliminated in Vuk Karadžić's alphabet and replaced by digraph је.

=== Old Slavonic, Old East Slavic ===
In the oldest Slavonic manuscripts, Є was just a graphical variant of Е and thus represents /e/ without palatalization. Later Є replaced Ѥ (i.e. denotes /ʲe/ after consonants and /je/ after vowels and in an initial position). Later on, it also accepted both a decorative role (as an initial letter of a word, even if there was no iotation) and an orthographical role, to make the distinction between certain homonymical forms (mostly between plural and singular).

=== New Church Slavonic ===
Since the mid-17th century, the Church Slavonic orthography has the following main rules related to the usage of shapes Є and Е:

- in an initial position, always use Є;
- otherwise, use Е with the following exceptions:
  - in noun's endings, use -євъ and -ємъ for plural and -евъ, -емъ for singular;
  - in other endings, suffixes and roots of nouns, adjectives, participles, numerals and pronouns, use Є for plural/dual, if there exists a homonymous form in the singular (either of the same word or a different one; the actual rule is much more complicated and not well-defined, as there are multiple other ways to eliminate such homonymy);
  - publishers from Kyiv also use Є in the genitive case of three pronouns (менє, тебє, себє), and Е in the accusative case (мене, тебе, себе);
- as a numerical sign (with value 5) use Є, not Е (the rule has often been ignored outside of the Russian Empire).

In the modern Church Slavonic alphabet, the 6th letter is typically shown as Єєе (one uppercase accompanied with two variants of lowercase).

The different shapes Є and Е exist only in lowercase; thus in all caps and small caps styles, the distinction between Є and Е disappears.

Old Believers print their books using an older variant of New Church Slavonic language. Its orthography combines the fully formal system described above with the older tradition to use Є phonetically (after vowels, to represent iotated /je/).

=== Similar characters ===
The United States Federal Geographic Data Committee uses Ꞓ, a character similar to capital Є, to represent the Cambrian Period in geologic history.

Є is similar to the symbol for the euro currency ⟨€⟩.

== Related letters and other similar characters ==
- Ε ε : Greek letter Epsilon
- Ɛ ɛ : Latin letter Epsilon
- Е е : Cyrillic letter Ye
- Е̂ е̂ : Cyrillic letter Ye with circumflex
- Ё ё : Cyrillic letter Yo
- Э э : Cyrillic letter E
- Ԑ ԑ : Cyrillic letter Reversed Ze
- E e : Latin letter E
- Ê ê : Latin letter E with circumflex - a Gagauz, Kurdish, Podlachian, and Vietnamese letter
- Ꞓ ꞓ : Latin letter Ꞓ
- ∈ or ∊: Element (mathematics)
- € : Euro Sign

== Computing codes ==
Character information
Preview	Є		є	
Unicode name	CYRILLIC CAPITAL LETTER; UKRAINIAN YE		CYRILLIC SMALL LETTER; UKRAINIAN YE	
Encodings	decimal	hex	dec	hex
Unicode	1028	U+0404	1108	U+0454
UTF-8	208 132	D0 84	209 148	D1 94
Numeric character reference	&#1028;	&#x404;	&#1108;	&#x454;
Named character reference	&Jukcy;		&jukcy;	
KOI8-U	180	B4	164	A4
Code page 855	135	87	134	86
Code page 866	242	F2	243	F3
Windows-1251	170	AA	186	BA
ISO-8859-5	164	A4	244	F4
Macintosh Cyrillic	184	B8	185	B9
