= Mac OS Barents Cyrillic =

Apple computer text character encoding

- Language(s): Kildin Sami, Komi, Nenets
- Created by: Evertype
- Classification: Extended ASCII
- Extends: US-ASCII
- Based on: Mac OS Cyrillic

The Macintosh Barents Cyrillic encoding is used in Apple Macintosh computers to represent texts in Kildin Sami, Komi, Mansi, and Nenets.

== Layout ==
Each character is shown with its equivalent Unicode code point. Only the second half of the table (code points 128–255) is shown, the first half (code points 0–127) being the same as ASCII.

Macintosh Barents Cyrillic
	0	1	2	3	4	5	6	7	8	9	A	B	C	D	E	F
8x	А	Б	В	Г	Д	Е	Ж	З	И	Й	К	Л	М	Н	О	П
9x	Р	С	Т	У	Ф	Х	Ц	Ч	Ш	Щ	Ъ	Ы	Ь	Э	Ю	Я
Ax	†	°	Ӧ	£	§	•	¶	І	®	©	™	Ӈ	ӈ	≠	ʼ	ˮ
Bx	∞	±	≤	≥	і	Ё̄	ӧ	Ј	Ӭ	ӭ	Ӓ	ӓ	Ӆ	ӆ	Ӊ	ӊ
Cx	ј	Ҍ	◌̄ (Note: This code point is for tall characters.)	◌̄	ƒ	≈	ё̄	«	»	…	NBSP	Ӎ	ӎ	Ҏ	ҏ	ҍ
Dx	–	—	“	”	‘	’	÷	„	Ҋ	ҋ	Һ	һ	№	Ё	ё	я
Ex	а	б	в	г	д	е	ж	з	и	й	к	л	м	н	о	п
Fx	р	с	т	у	ф	х	ц	ч	ш	щ	ъ	ы	ь	э	ю	€

Differences from MacCyrillic

== See also ==
- ISO-IR-200: ISO 8859-5 derivative created for the same languages, also with Michael Everson's involvement.
