= Epsilon =

Fifth letter of the Greek alphabet

Epsilon (/ˈɛpsɪlɒn/, uppercase Ε, lowercase ε or ϵ; Greek: έψιλον) is the fifth letter of the Greek alphabet, corresponding phonetically to a mid front unrounded vowel IPA: [e̞] or IPA: [ɛ̝]. In the system of Greek numerals it also has the value five. It was derived from the Phoenician letter He (𐤄). Letters that arose from epsilon include the Latin E, Ë and Ɛ, and Cyrillic Е, È, Ё, Є and Э. The name of the letter was originally εἶ (eî [êː]), but it was later changed to ἒ ψιλόν (è psilón 'simple e') in the Middle Ages to distinguish the letter from the digraph ⟨αι⟩, a former diphthong that had come to be pronounced [e], and because the digraph ⟨ει⟩ had become unsuitable due to its own shift to [i]. In Modern Greek, its name has fused into έψιλον (épsilon).

The uppercase form of epsilon is identical to Latin ⟨E⟩ but has its own code point in Unicode: U+0395 Ε GREEK CAPITAL LETTER EPSILON. The lowercase version has two typographical variants, both inherited from medieval Greek handwriting. One, the most common in modern typography and inherited from medieval minuscule, looks like a reversed number "3" and is encoded U+03B5 ε GREEK SMALL LETTER EPSILON. The other, also known as lunate or uncial epsilon and inherited from earlier uncial writing, looks like a semicircle crossed by a horizontal bar: it is encoded U+03F5 ϵ GREEK LUNATE EPSILON SYMBOL. While in normal typography these are just alternative font variants, they may have different meanings as mathematical symbols: computer systems therefore offer distinct encodings for them. In TeX, \epsilon ( $\epsilon\!$ ) denotes the lunate form, while \varepsilon ( $\varepsilon$ ) denotes the epsilon number. Unicode versions 2.0.0 and onwards use ɛ as the lowercase Greek epsilon letter, but in version 1.0.0, ϵ was used. The lunate or uncial epsilon provided inspiration for the euro sign, €.

There is also a 'Latin epsilon', ⟨ɛ⟩ or "open e", which looks similar to the Greek lowercase epsilon. It is encoded in Unicode as U+025B ɛ LATIN SMALL LETTER OPEN E and U+0190 Ɛ LATIN CAPITAL LETTER OPEN E and is used as an IPA phonetic symbol. This Latin uppercase epsilon, Ɛ, is not to be confused with the Greek uppercase Σ (sigma).

The lunate epsilon, ⟨ϵ⟩, is not to be confused with the set membership symbol ∈. The symbol $\in$, first used in set theory and logic by Giuseppe Peano and now used in mathematics in general for set membership ("belongs to"), evolved from the letter epsilon, since the symbol was originally used as an abbreviation for the Latin word est. In addition, mathematicians often read the symbol ∈ as "element of", as in "1 is an element of the natural numbers" for $1\in\N$, for example. As late as 1960, ɛ itself was used for set membership, while its negation "does not belong to" (now ∉) was denoted by ε' (epsilon prime). Only gradually did a fully separate, stylized symbol take the place of epsilon in this role.

In a related context, Peano also introduced the use of a backwards epsilon, ⟨϶⟩, for the phrase "such that", although the abbreviation s.t. is occasionally used in place of ϶ in informal cardinals.

== History ==
=== Origin ===
The letter ⟨Ε⟩ was adopted from the Phoenician letter He (𐤄) when Greeks first adopted alphabetic writing. In archaic Greek writing, its shape is often still identical to that of the Phoenician letter. Like other Greek letters, it could face either leftward or rightward, depending on the current writing direction, but, just as in Phoenician, the horizontal bars always faced in the direction of writing. Archaic writing often preserves the Phoenician form with a vertical stem extending slightly below the lowest horizontal bar. In the classical era, through the influence of more cursive writing styles, the shape was simplified to the current ⟨E⟩ glyph.

=== Sound value ===
While the original pronunciation of the Phoenician letter He was [h], the earliest Greek sound value of Ε was determined by the vowel occurring in the Phoenician letter name, which made it a natural choice for being reinterpreted from a consonant symbol to a vowel symbol denoting an [e] sound. Besides its classical Greek sound value, the short /e/ phoneme, it could initially also be used for other [e]-like sounds. For instance, in early Attic before c. 500 BC, it was used also both for the long, open /ɛː/, and for the long close /eː/. In the former role, it was later replaced in the classic Greek alphabet by Eta (⟨Η⟩), which was taken over from eastern Ionic alphabets, while in the latter role it was replaced by the digraph ⟨ΕΙ⟩.

=== Epichoric alphabets ===
Some dialects used yet other ways of distinguishing between various e-like sounds.

In Corinth, the normal function of ⟨Ε⟩ to denote /e/ and /ɛː/ was taken by a glyph resembling a pointed B, while ⟨Ε⟩ was used only for long close /eː/. The letter Beta, in turn, took the deviant shape.

In Sicyon, a variant glyph resembling an ⟨X⟩ was used in the same function as Corinthian.

In Thespiai (Boeotia), a special letter form consisting of a vertical stem with a single rightward-pointing horizontal bar was used for what was probably a raised variant of /e/ in pre-vocalic environments. This tack glyph was used elsewhere also as a form of "Heta", i.e. for the sound /h/.

=== Glyph variants ===
After the establishment of the canonical Ionian (Euclidean) Greek alphabet, new glyph variants for Ε were introduced through handwriting. In the uncial script (used for literary papyrus manuscripts in late antiquity and then in early medieval vellum codices), the "lunate" shape (ϵ) became predominant. In cursive handwriting, a large number of shorthand glyphs came to be used, where the cross-bar and the curved stroke were linked in various ways. Some of them resembled a modern lowercase Latin "e", some a "6" with a connecting stroke to the next letter starting from the middle, and some a combination of two small "c"-like curves. Several of these shapes were later taken over into minuscule book hand. Of the various minuscule letter shapes, the inverted-3 form became the basis for lower-case Epsilon in Greek typography during the modern era.

Uncial	Uncial variants	Cursive variants	Minuscule	Minuscule with ligatures
inline	inline	inline	inline	inline

== Uses ==
=== International Phonetic Alphabet ===
Despite its pronunciation as mid, in the International Phonetic Alphabet, the Latin epsilon /ɛ/ represents open-mid front unrounded vowel, as in the English word pet /pɛt/.

=== Symbol ===
The uppercase Epsilon is not commonly used outside of the Greek language because of its similarity to the Latin letter E. However, it is commonly used in structural mechanics with Young's Modulus equations for calculating tensile, compressive and areal strain.

The Greek lowercase epsilon ε, the lunate epsilon symbol ϵ, and the Latin lowercase epsilon ɛ (see above) are used in a variety of places:

- In engineering mechanics strain calculations, ε represents the increase of length divided by the original length. Usually this relates to extensometer testing of metallic materials.
- In mathematics
  - (In early calculus or nonstandard analysis) An infinitesimally small positive quantity is commonly denoted ε.
    - (In analysis) By extension, a quantity thought of as "small", "negligible", or, especially, "arbitrarily small", is often denoted ε. For instance, quantities subject to a limit which takes them towards zero are often denoted ε; see (ε, δ)-definition of limit.
  - Hilbert introduced epsilon terms $\epsilon x.\phi$ as an extension to first-order logic; see epsilon calculus.
  - it is used to represent the Levi-Civita symbol.
  - it is used to represent dual numbers: $a+b \varepsilon$, with $\varepsilon^{2}=0$ and $\varepsilon \neq 0$.
  - it is sometimes used to denote the Heaviside step function.
  - in set theory, the epsilon numbers are ordinal numbers that satisfy the fixed point ε = ω^{ε}. The first epsilon number, ε_{0}, is the limit ordinal of the set {ω, ω^{ω}, ω^{ω^{ω}}, ...}.
  - in numerical analysis and statistics it is used as the error term
  - in group theory it is used as the idempotent group when e is in use as a variable name
- In computer science
  - it often represents the empty string, though different writers use a variety of other symbols for the empty string as well; usually the lower-case Greek letter lambda (λ).
  - the machine epsilon indicates the upper bound on the relative error due to rounding in floating point arithmetic.
- In physics,
  - it indicates the permittivity of a medium; with the subscript 0 (ε_{0}) it is the permittivity of free space.
  - it can also indicate the strain of a material (a ratio of extensions).
  - in quantum field theory, it usually indicates the dimensional regularization parameter.
- In automata theory, it shows a transition that involves no shifting of an input symbol.
- In astronomy,
  - it stands for the fifth-brightest star in a constellation (see Bayer designation).
  - Epsilon is the name for the most distant and most visible ring of Uranus.
  - In planetary science, ε denotes the axial tilt.
- In chemistry, it represents the molar extinction coefficient of a chromophore.
- In economics, ε refers to elasticity.
- In statistics,
  - it is used to refer to error terms.
  - it also can to refer to the degree of sphericity in repeated measures ANOVAs.
- In agronomy, it is used to represent the "photosynthetic efficiency" of a particular plant or crop.

== Unicode ==
For accented Greek characters, see Greek diacritics: Computer encoding.

- U+0190 Ɛ LATIN CAPITAL LETTER OPEN E
- U+025B ɛ LATIN SMALL LETTER OPEN E
- U+025C ɜ LATIN SMALL LETTER REVERSED OPEN E
- U+025D ɝ LATIN SMALL LETTER REVERSED OPEN E WITH HOOK
- U+025E ɞ LATIN SMALL LETTER CLOSED REVERSED OPEN E
- U+029A ʚ LATIN SMALL LETTER CLOSED OPEN E
- U+0388 Έ GREEK CAPITAL LETTER EPSILON WITH TONOS
- U+0395 Ε GREEK CAPITAL LETTER EPSILON (&Epsilon;)
- U+03AD έ GREEK SMALL LETTER EPSILON WITH TONOS
- U+03B5 ε GREEK SMALL LETTER EPSILON (&epsi;, &epsilon;) (\varepsilon in TeX)
- U+03F5 ϵ GREEK LUNATE EPSILON SYMBOL (&epsiv;, &straightepsilon;, &varepsilon;) (\epsilon in TeX)
- U+03F6 ϶ GREEK REVERSED LUNATE EPSILON SYMBOL (&backepsilon;, &bepsi;)
- U+1D08 ᴈ LATIN SMALL LETTER TURNED OPEN E
- U+1D4B ᵋ MODIFIER LETTER SMALL OPEN E
- U+1D4C ᵌ MODIFIER LETTER SMALL TURNED OPEN E
- U+1D93 ᶓ LATIN SMALL LETTER OPEN E WITH RETROFLEX HOOK
- U+1D94 ᶔ LATIN SMALL LETTER REVERSED OPEN E WITH RETROFLEX HOOK
- U+1D9F ᶟ MODIFIER LETTER SMALL REVERSED OPEN E
- U+2377 ⍷ APL FUNCTIONAL SYMBOL EPSILON UNDERBAR
- U+2C88 Ⲉ COPTIC CAPITAL LETTER EIE
- U+2C89 ⲉ COPTIC SMALL LETTER EIE
- U+2CB6 Ⲷ COPTIC CAPITAL LETTER CRYPTOGRAMMIC EIE
- U+2CB7 ⲷ COPTIC SMALL LETTER CRYPTOGRAMMIC EIE
- U+A7AB Ɜ LATIN CAPITAL LETTER REVERSED OPEN E
- U+1078F 𐞏 MODIFIER LETTER SMALL CLOSED REVERSED OPEN E
- U+1D6AC 𝚬 MATHEMATICAL BOLD CAPITAL EPSILON (Note: The mathematical symbols are used only in math. Stylized Greek text should be encoded using the normal Greek letters, with markup and formatting to indicate text style.)
- U+1D6C6 𝛆 MATHEMATICAL BOLD SMALL EPSILON
- U+1D6DC 𝛜 MATHEMATICAL BOLD EPSILON SYMBOL
- U+1D6E6 𝛦 MATHEMATICAL ITALIC CAPITAL EPSILON
- U+1D700 𝜀 MATHEMATICAL ITALIC SMALL EPSILON
- U+1D716 𝜖 MATHEMATICAL ITALIC EPSILON SYMBOL
- U+1D720 𝜠 MATHEMATICAL BOLD ITALIC CAPITAL EPSILON
- U+1D73A 𝜺 MATHEMATICAL BOLD ITALIC SMALL EPSILON
- U+1D750 𝝐 MATHEMATICAL BOLD ITALIC EPSILON SYMBOL
- U+1D75A 𝝚 MATHEMATICAL SANS-SERIF BOLD CAPITAL EPSILON
- U+1D774 𝝴 MATHEMATICAL SANS-SERIF BOLD SMALL EPSILON
- U+1D78A 𝞊 MATHEMATICAL SANS-SERIF BOLD EPSILON SYMBOL
- U+1D794 𝞔 MATHEMATICAL SANS-SERIF BOLD ITALIC CAPITAL EPSILON
- U+1D7AE 𝞮 MATHEMATICAL SANS-SERIF BOLD ITALIC SMALL EPSILON
- U+1D7C4 𝟄 MATHEMATICAL SANS-SERIF BOLD ITALIC EPSILON SYMBOL

== Initial ==
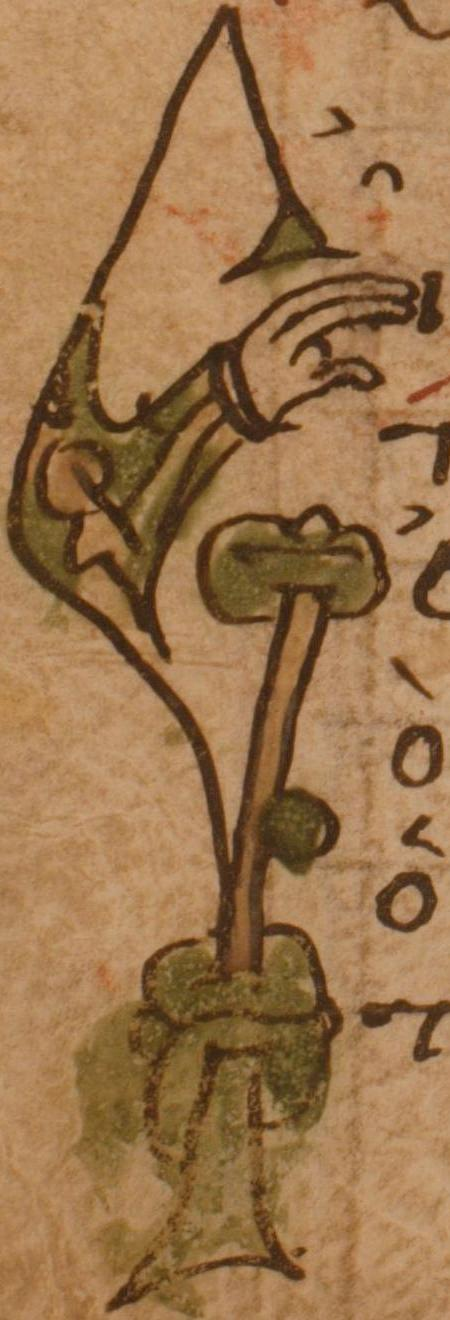
Initial epsilon in Lectionary 226, folio 20 verso

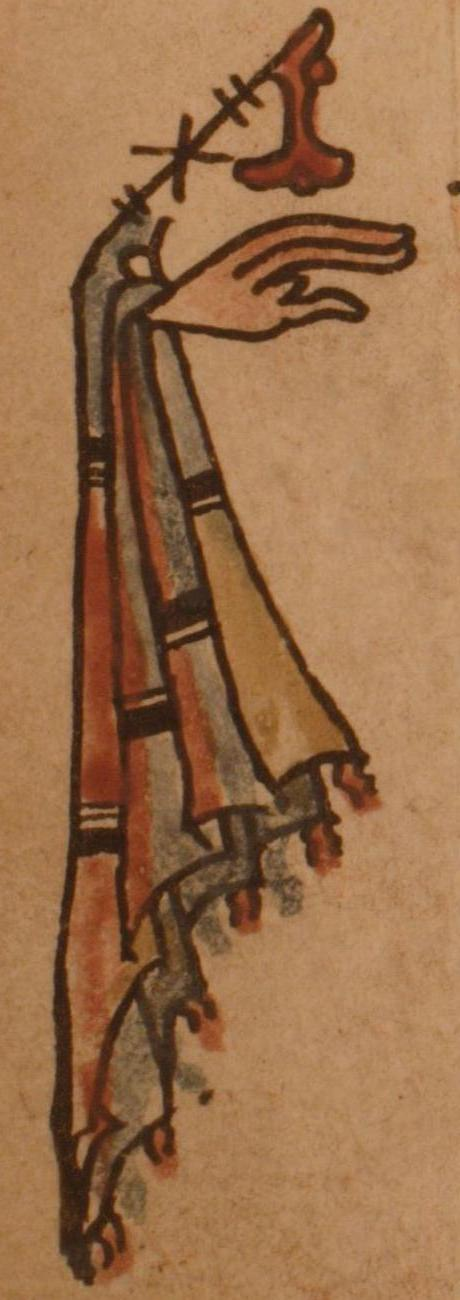
folio 64 verso

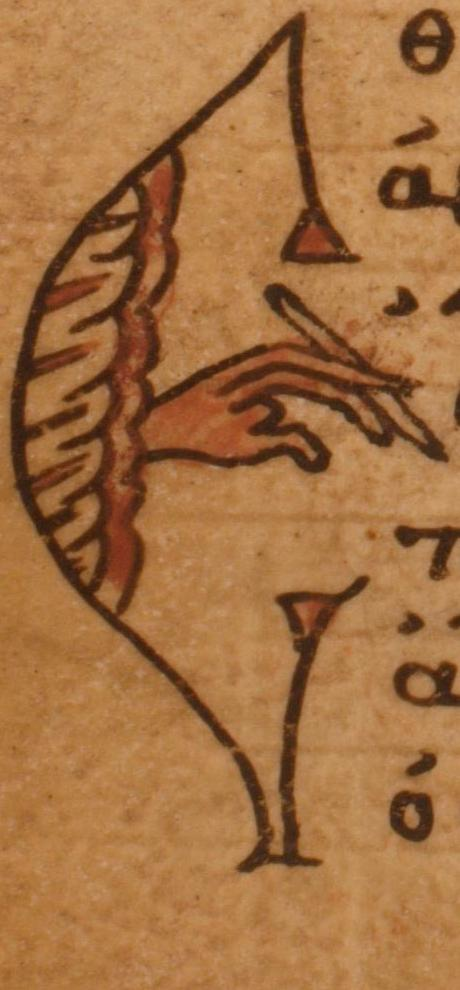
folio 125 verso

== See also ==
- Е and е, the letter Ye of the Cyrillic alphabet
- Є є, Ukrainian Ye
- Ԑ ԑ, Reversed Ze
- E (disambiguation)
