= Mac OS Ukrainian encoding =

Character encoding on Macintosh computers

Mac OS Ukrainian
- Alias(es): x-mac-ukrainian, Code page 10017
- Languages: Ukrainian, others.
- Created by: Apple, Inc
- Classification: Extended ASCII, Mac OS script
- Extends: US-ASCII
- Based on: MacCyrillic (original)
- Succeeded by: MacCyrillic (Euro update)

Mac OS Ukrainian is a character encoding used on Apple Macintosh computers prior to Mac OS 9 to represent texts in Cyrillic script which include the letters ‹Ґ› and ‹ґ›, including the Ukrainian alphabet.

It is a variant of the original Mac OS Cyrillic encoding. Code points 162 (0xA2) representing the character ‹¢› and 182 (0xB6) representing the character ‹∂› were redefined to represent ‹Ґ› and ‹ґ›, respectively.

Since Mac OS 9, ‹Ґ› and ‹ґ› have been included in the Macintosh Cyrillic encoding. FreeDOS calls it code page 58627.

== Code page layout ==
Each character is shown with its equivalent Unicode code point. Only the second half of the table (code points 128–255) is shown, the first half (code points 0–127) being the same as ASCII.

Mac OS Ukrainian
| | 0 | 1 | 2 | 3 | 4 | 5 | 6 | 7 | 8 | 9 | A | B | C | D | E | F |
|---|---|---|---|---|---|---|---|---|---|---|---|---|---|---|---|---|
| 8x | А | Б | В | Г | Д | Е | Ж | З | И | Й | К | Л | М | Н | О | П |
| 9x | Р | С | Т | У | Ф | Х | Ц | Ч | Ш | Щ | Ъ | Ы | Ь | Э | Ю | Я |
| Ax | † | ° | Ґ | £ | § | • | ¶ | І | ® | © | ™ | Ђ | ђ | ≠ | Ѓ | ѓ |
| Bx | ∞ | ± | ≤ | ≥ | і | µ | ґ | Ј | Є | є | Ї | ї | Љ | љ | Њ | њ |
| Cx | ј | Ѕ | ¬ | √ | ƒ | ≈ | ∆ | « | » | … | NBSP | Ћ | ћ | Ќ | ќ | ѕ |
| Dx | – | — | “ | ” | ‘ | ’ | ÷ | „ | Ў | ў | Џ | џ | № | Ё | ё | я |
| Ex | а | б | в | г | д | е | ж | з | и | й | к | л | м | н | о | п |
| Fx | р | с | т | у | ф | х | ц | ч | ш | щ | ъ | ы | ь | э | ю | ¤ |

The following code points differ between Macintosh Cyrillic and Macintosh Ukrainian encodings:

| | A2 | B6 | FF |
| Macintosh Cyrillic before Mac OS 9.0 also Microsoft code page 10007 | ¢ | ∂ | ¤ |
| Macintosh Ukrainian before Mac OS 9.0 also Microsoft code page 10017 | Ґ | ґ | ¤ |
| Macintosh Cyrillic since Mac OS 9.0 | Ґ | ґ | € |
