= Lectionary 226 =

Lectionary ℓ 226
- New Testament manuscript
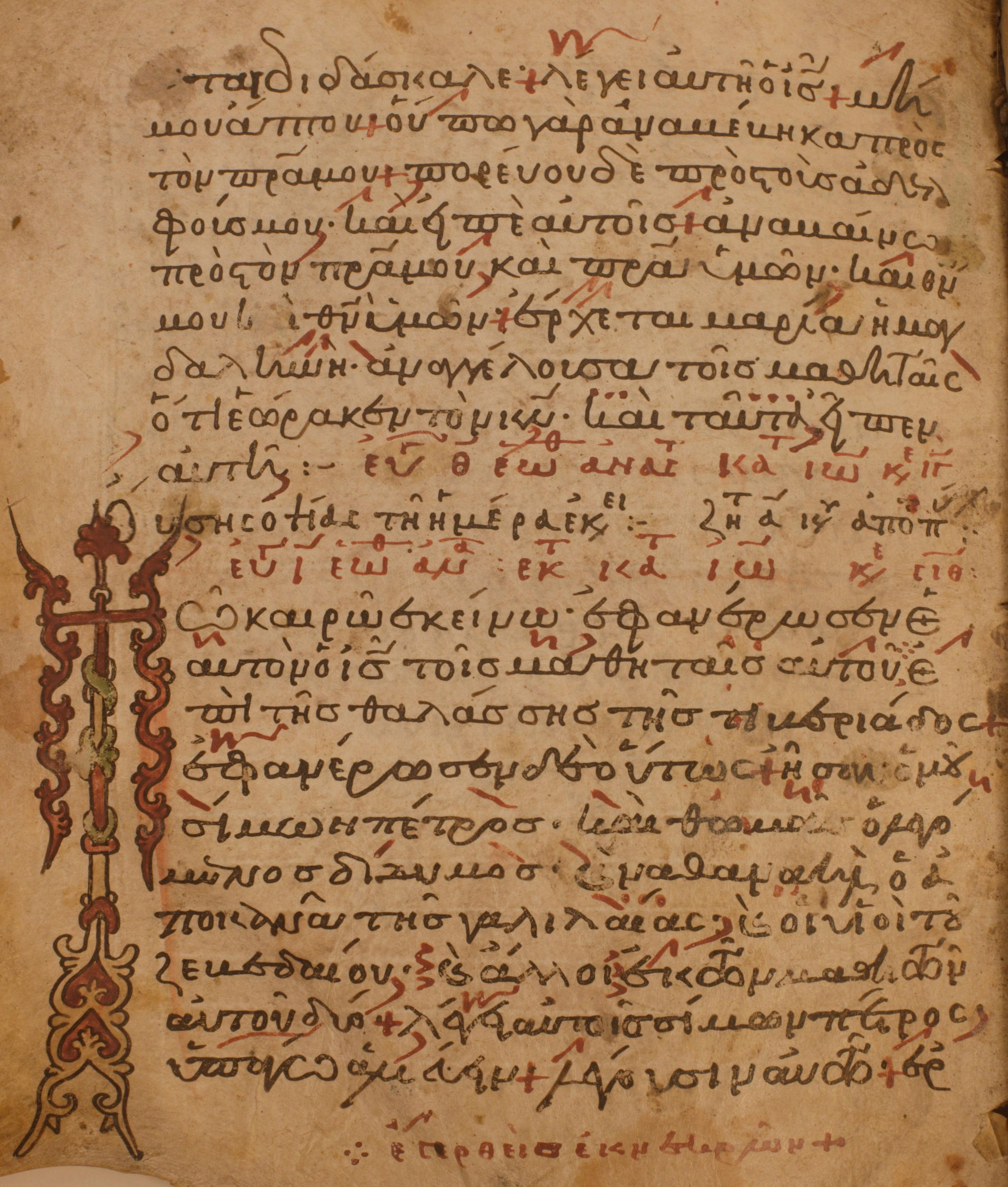
- Folio 207 verso, with decorated initial for letter "tau"
- Text: Evangelistarium †
- Date: 14th century
- Script: Greek
- Now at: University of Michigan
- Size: 22 cm by 17.6 cm
- Note: decorated initials

Lectionary 226, designated by siglum ℓ 226 (in the Gregory-Aland numbering) is a Greek manuscript of the New Testament, on parchment. Palaeographically it has been assigned to the 14th century. F. H. A. Scrivener labelled it by 249^{evl}. Some leaves of the manuscript were lost, and some leaves have survived in a fragmentary condition.

== Description ==
The codex contains saints' day lessons from the Gospels of John, Matthew, Luke lectionary (Evangelistarium), on 220 parchment leaves (22 cm by 17.6 cm), with lacuna at the beginning. The text is written in Greek minuscule letters, in one column per page, 21 lines per page. It has accents and breathings (in red).

The initial letters are decorated; some of decorations are zoomorphic (birds, fishes), anthropomorphic (hands), and other motifs. The most significant or interesting images are on folio 25 recto, 96 verso, 114 verso.

The manuscript contains Menologion, but many leaves of it were lost.

Fifteen leaves are palimpsest, over writing two centuries earlier, containing in double columns lessons of the Septuaginta from Book of Genesis, Book of Proverbs, and Book of Isaiah. The palimpsest text is written in 24–27 lines per page. The other 205 leaves have only one column on a page.

== History ==
Scrivener and Gregory dated the manuscript to the 14th century. It is currently assigned by the INTF to the 14th century. The name of the scribe is unknown.

Of the early history of the codex nothing is known until the year 1864, when it was in the possession of a dealer at Janina (Epeiros). It was then purchased from him by a representative of Baroness Burdett-Coutts (1814–1906), for one hundred pounds, along with more than one hundred other Greek manuscripts. They were transported to England in 1870-1871. The manuscript was presented by Burdett-Coutts to Sir Roger Cholmely's School, and was housed at the Highgate (Burdett-Coutts III. 46), in London.

The manuscript was added to the list of New Testament manuscripts by Scrivener (number 249) and Gregory (number 226). Gregory saw it in 1883. In 1922 it was acquired for the University of Michigan. The manuscript is now housed at the University of Michigan (Ms. 28) in Ann Arbor.

The manuscript is sporadically cited in the critical editions of the Greek New Testament (UBS3).

== Gallery ==
Initials

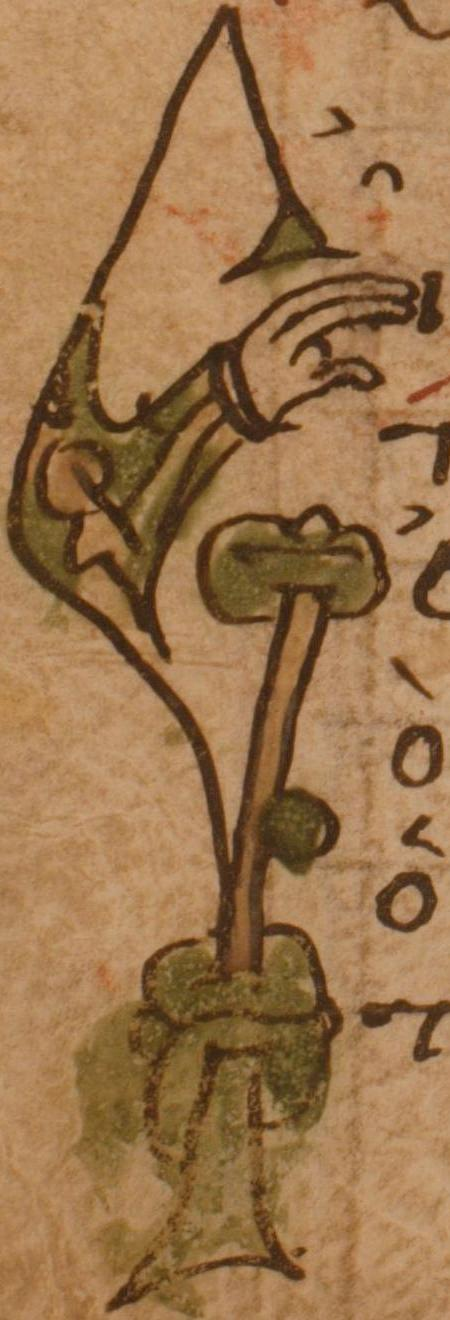
Folio 20 v, initial for epsilon

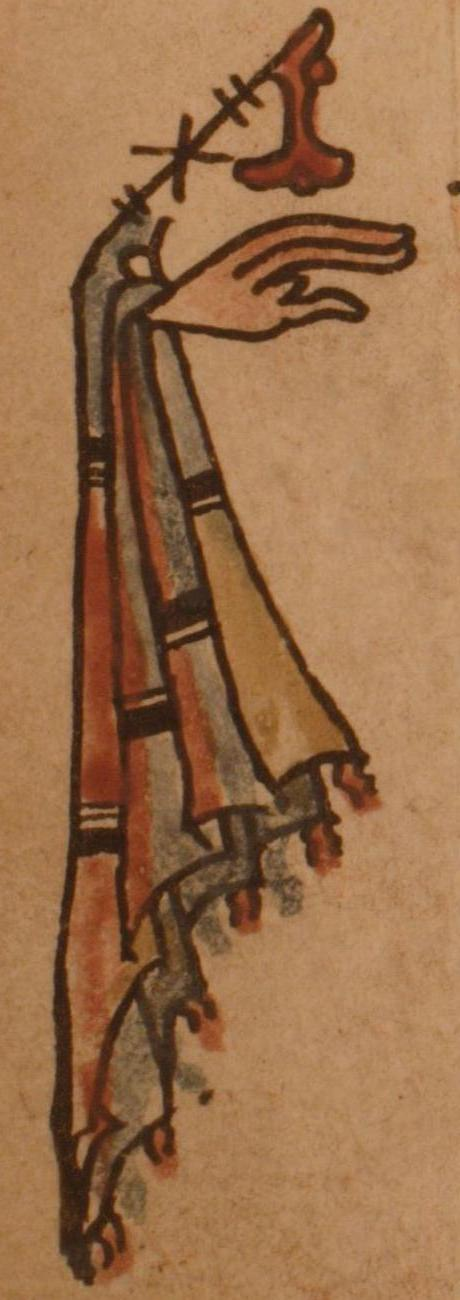
Folio 64 v, initial for epsilon

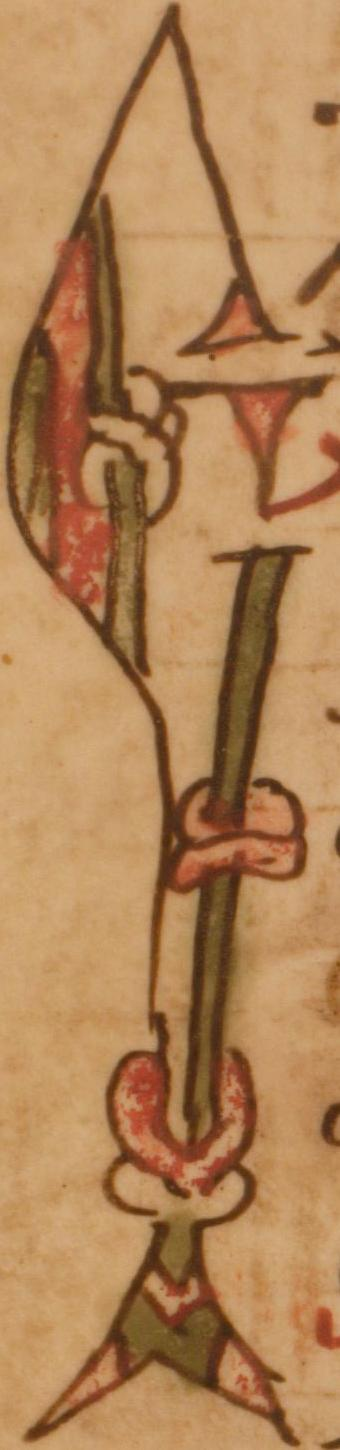
Folio 103 v, initial for epsilon

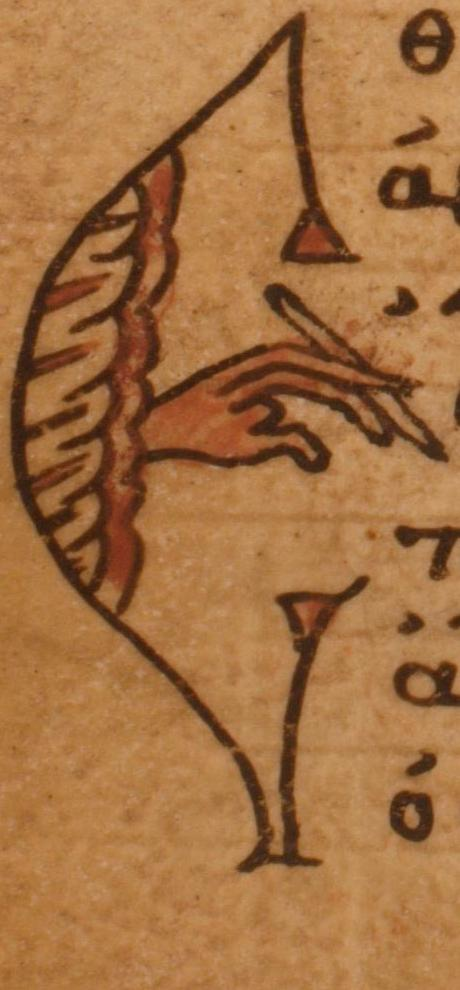
Folio 125 v, initial for epsilon

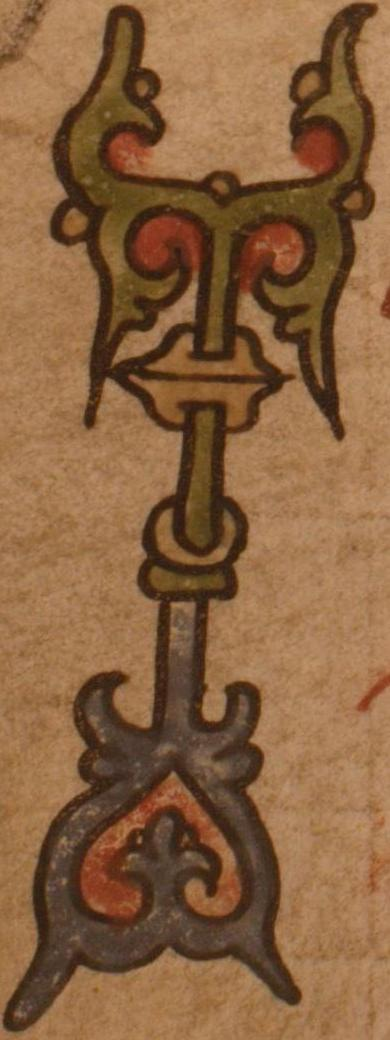
Folio 48 v, initial for tau

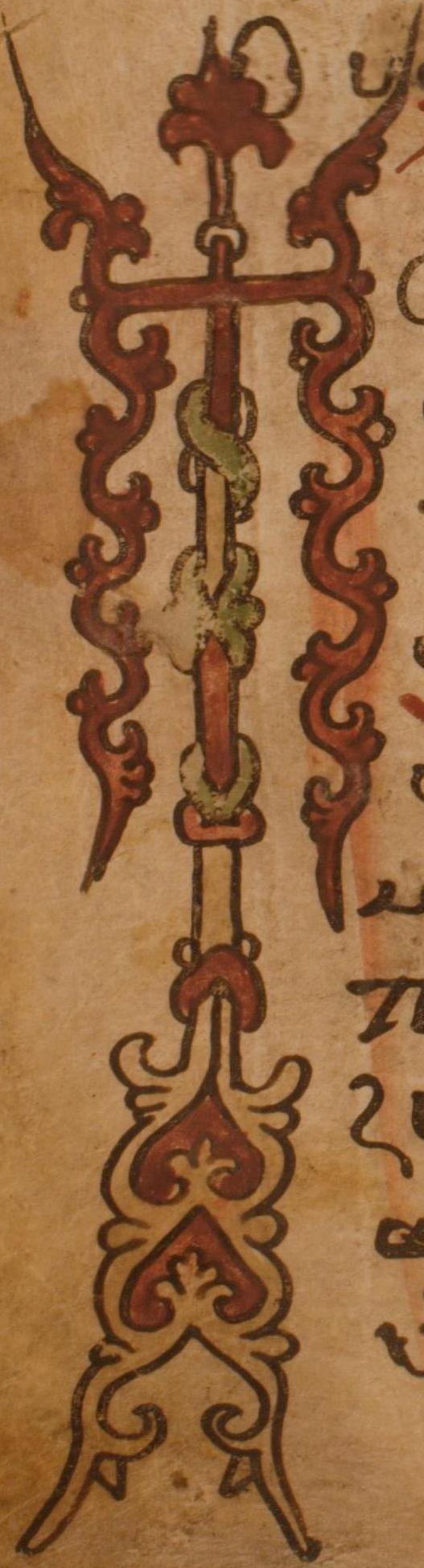
Folio 207 v, initial for tau
Pages

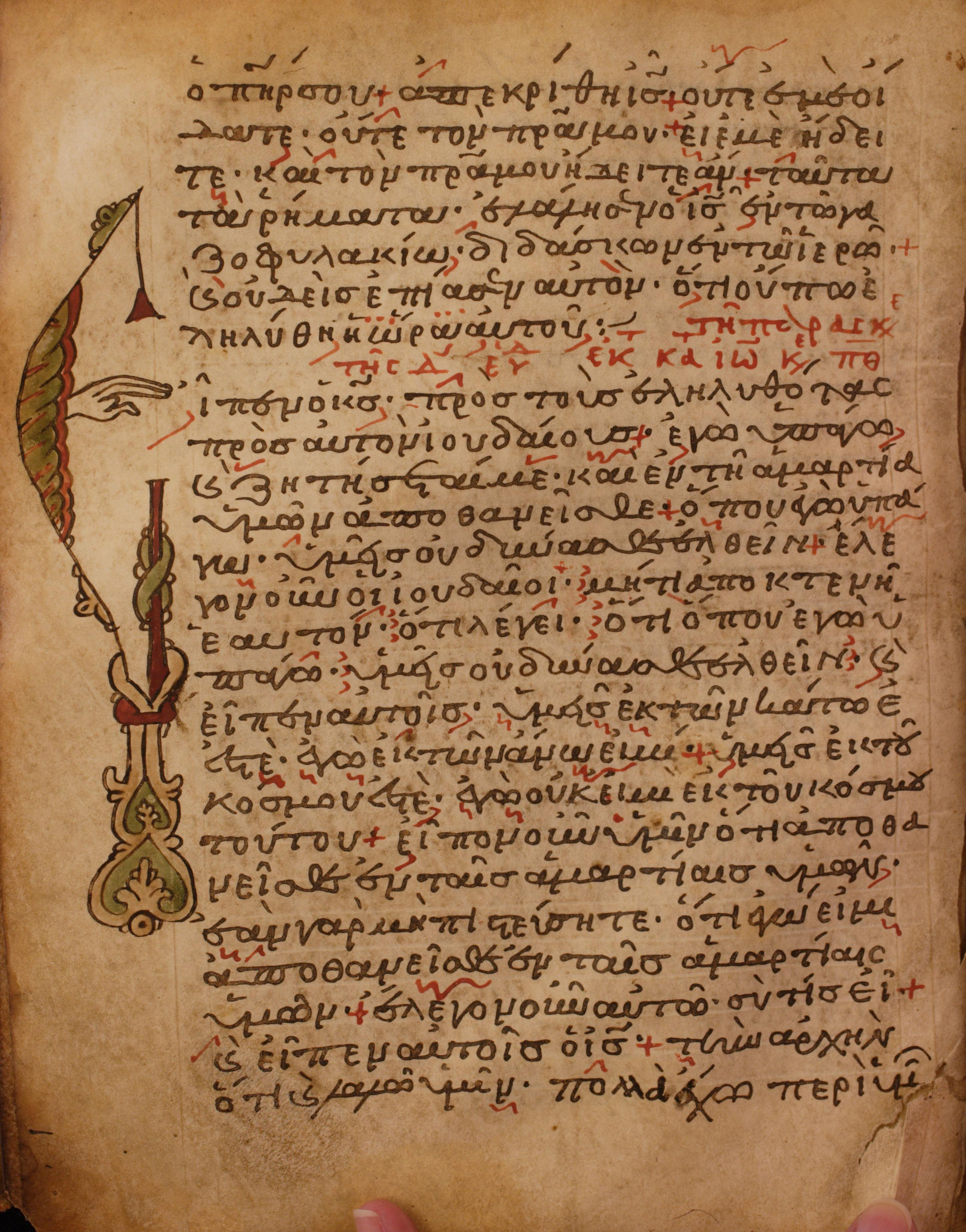
Folio 5 verso

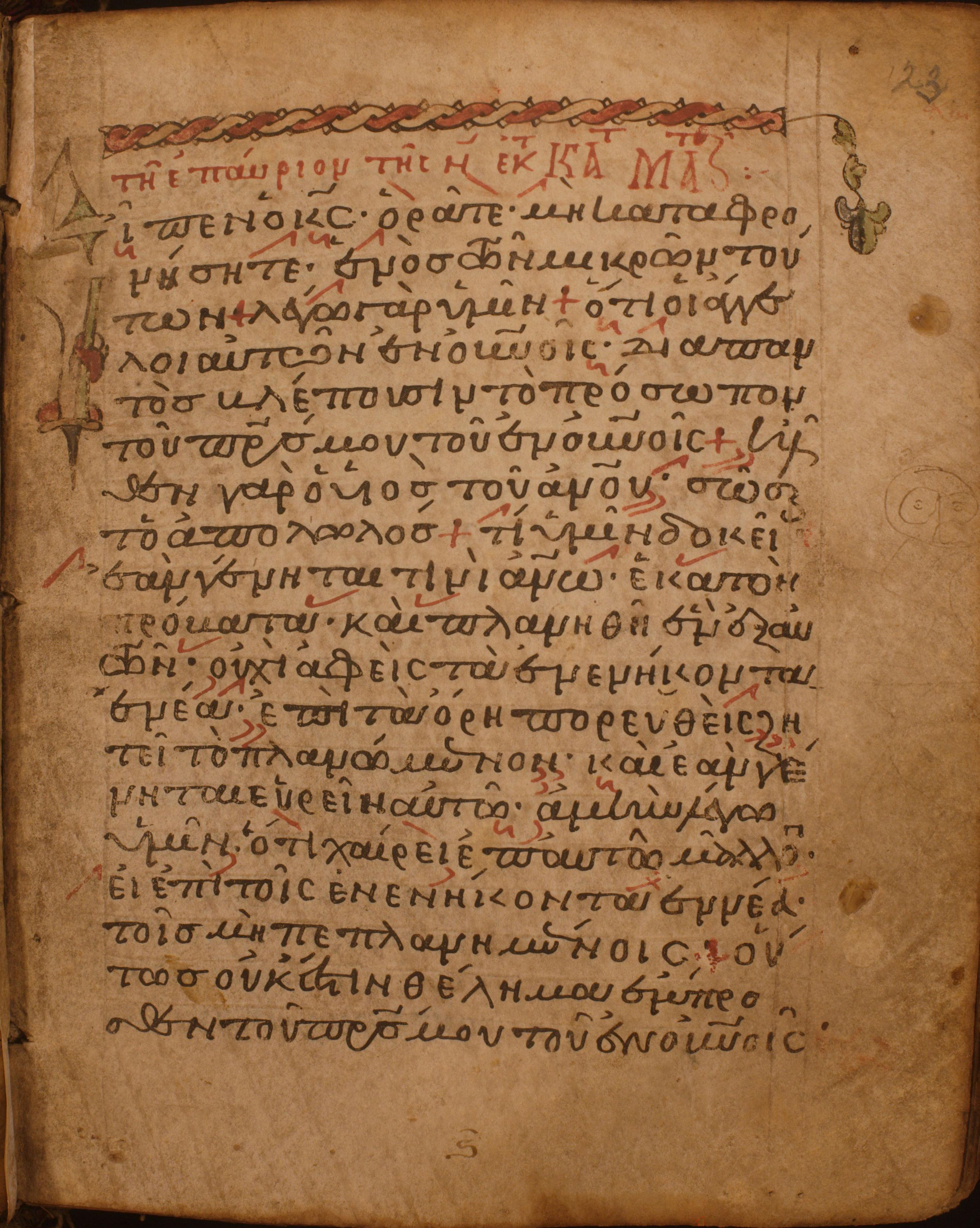
Folio 25 recto

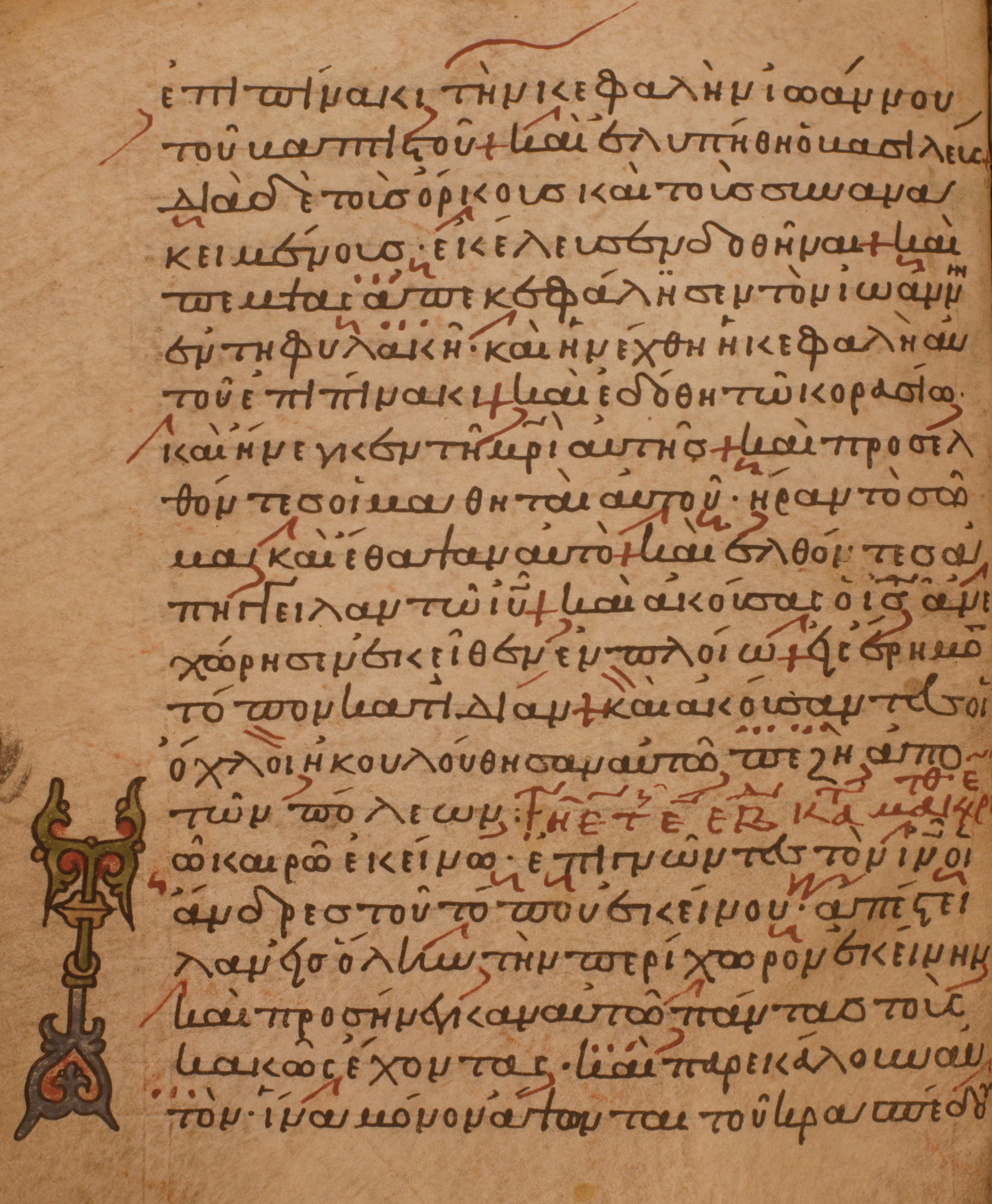
Folio 48 verso

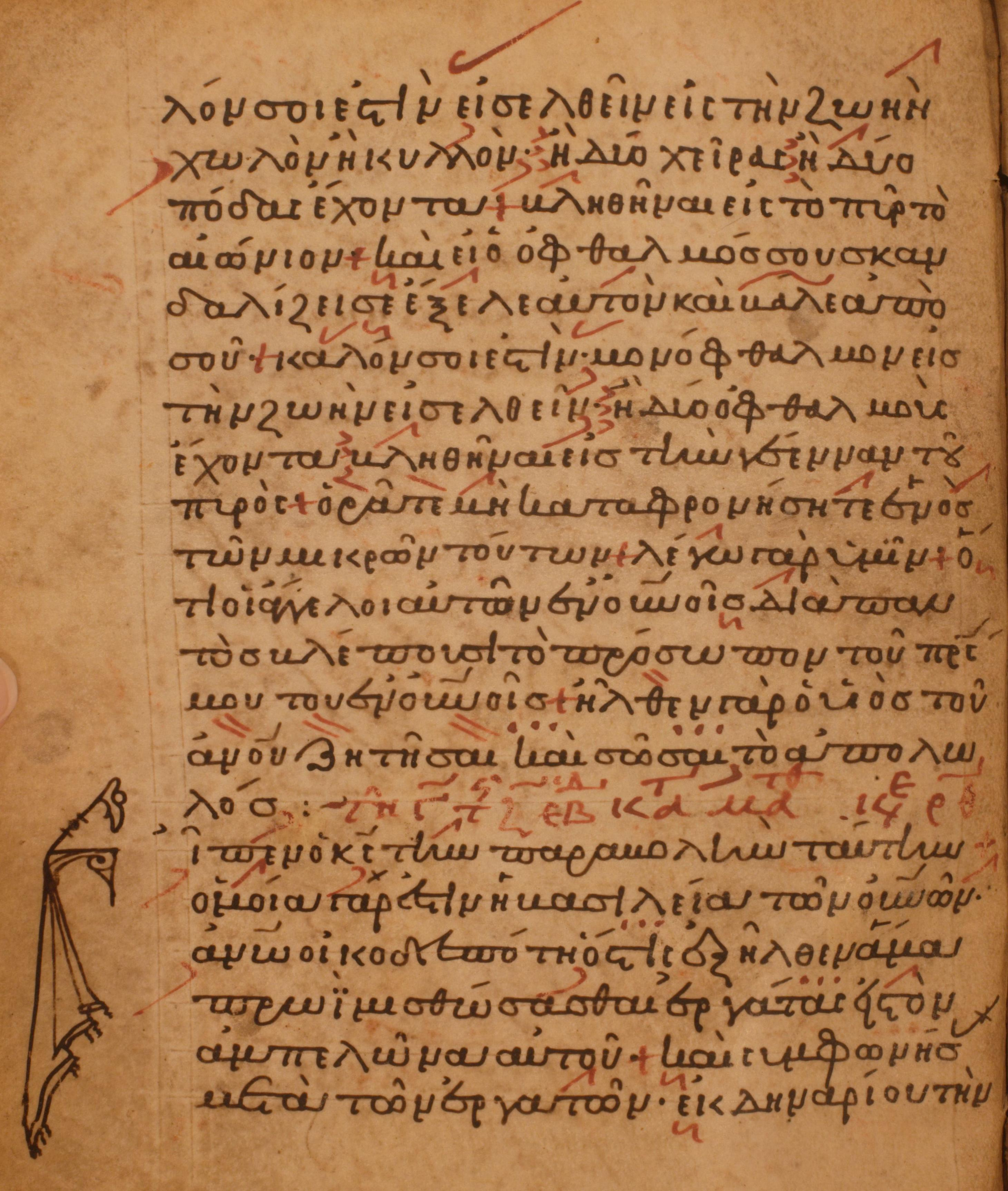
Folio 55 verso

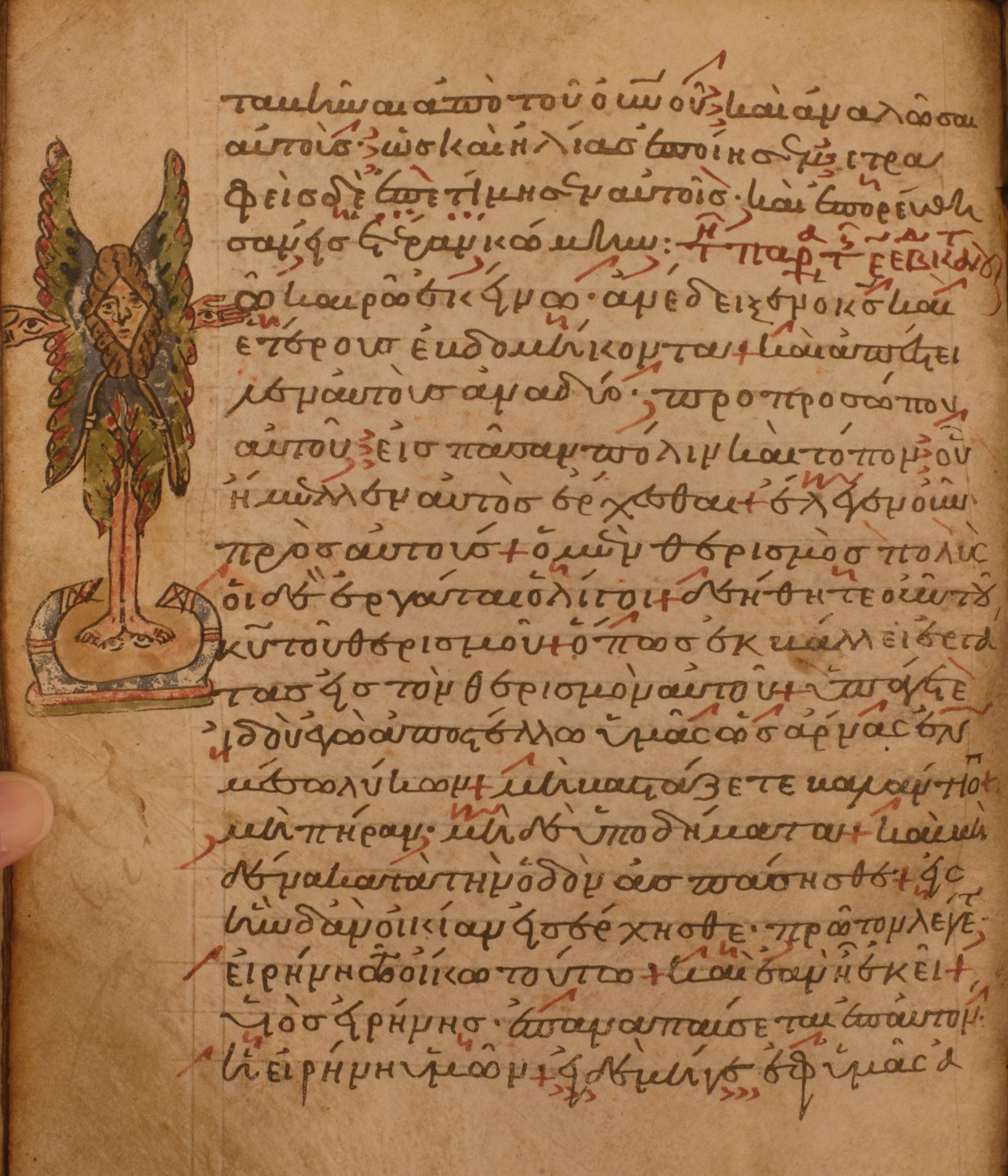
Folio 96 verso

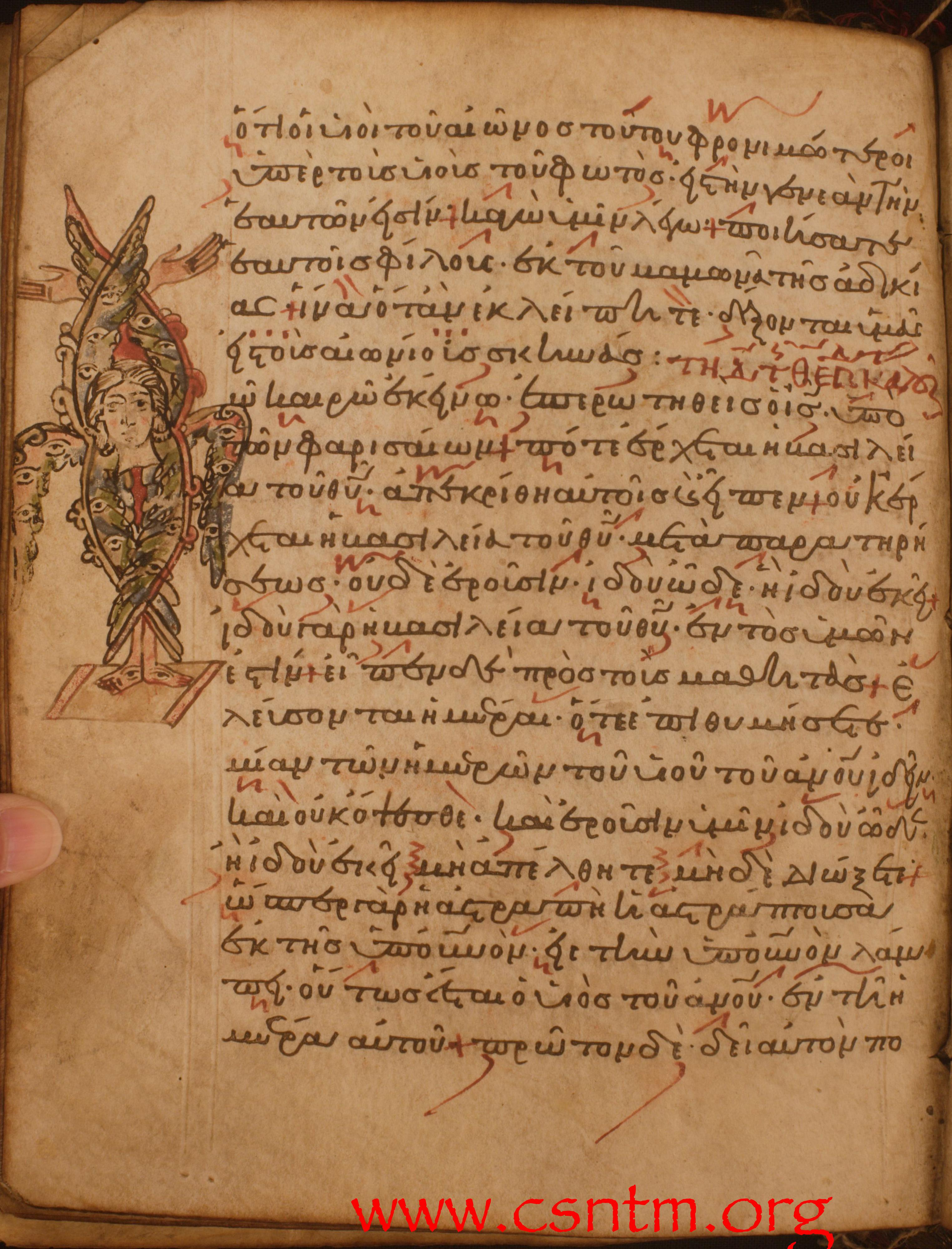
Folio 114 verso

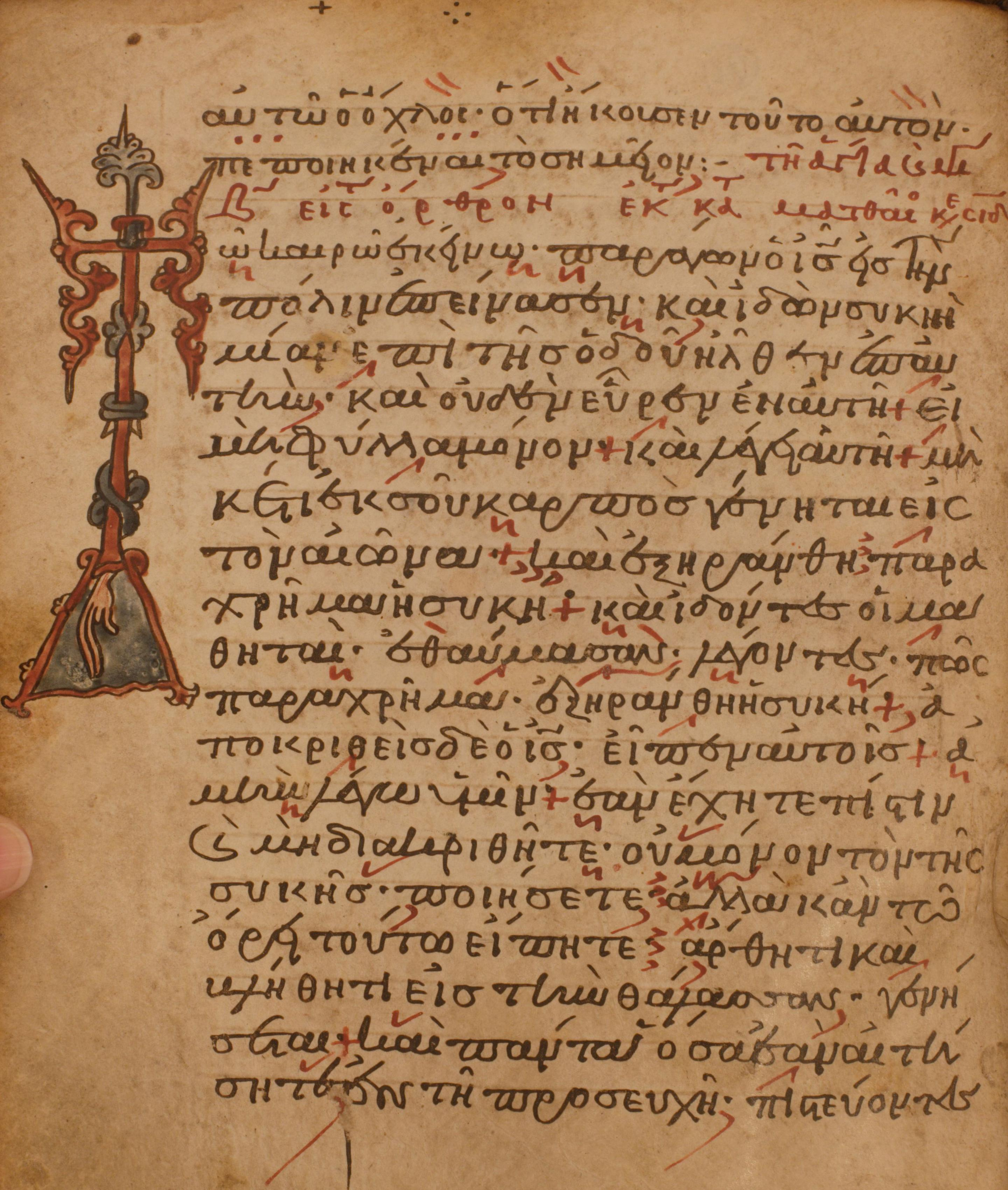
Folio 149 verso

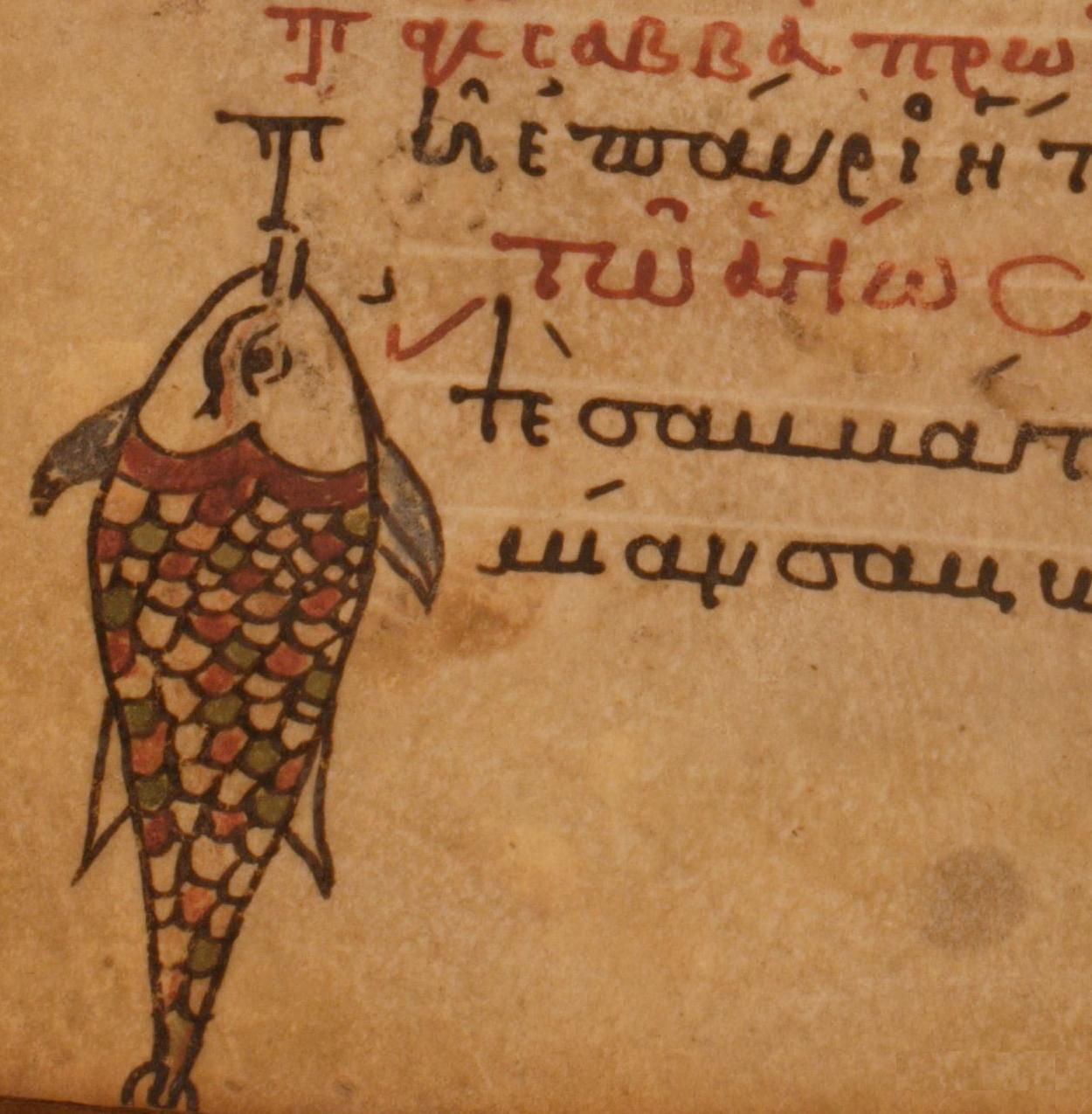
Folio 202 verso, the decorated initial letter

== See also ==
- List of New Testament lectionaries
- Biblical manuscript
- Textual criticism

== Bibliography ==
- Kenneth W. Clark, A Descriptive Catalogue of Greek New Testament Manuscripts in America (Chicago, 1937), pp. 302–303.
