= Yoficator =

Software to adjust letters in Russian text

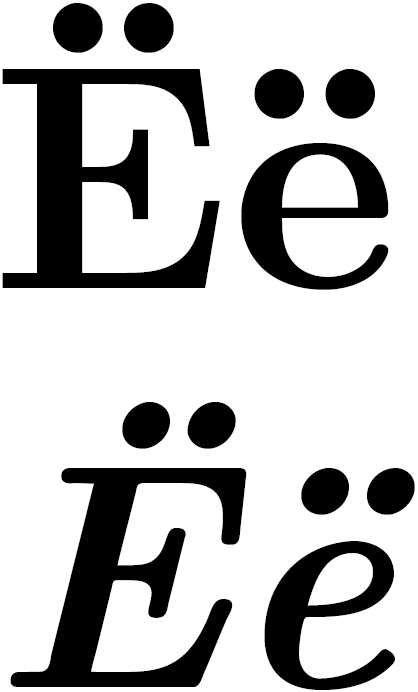
Yo

A yoficator or joficator (Russian: Ёфикатор) is a computer program or extension for a text editor that restores the Cyrillic letter Yo ⟨Ё⟩ in Russian texts in places where the letter Ye ⟨Е⟩ was used instead. The majority of Russian newspapers and publishers use Ye in all contexts, assuming that an educated reader can distinguish which letter is meant. This practice creates a large number of homographs (but not homophones) a yoficator is intended to fix.

The problem of choice between Ye and Yo in spelling can be fairly complex and requires a deep analysis of the context. Therefore, yoficators capable of completely solving this problem automatically do not yet exist. The existing yoficators rely on specially created databases of Russian words containing the letter Yo, and either replace Ye by Yo only in indisputable cases ("incomplete" or "quick yofication") or work interactively leaving the choice to the user in uncertain cases (as, for example, the choice between "все" — "everybody" and "всё" — "everything"). A combined strategy is implemented in a yoficator for GNU Emacs.

The term "yoficator" is also used to mean "one who yoficates", or, in the broad sense of the word, "a supporter of using the letter Yo".
