= Mac OS Turkic Cyrillic =

Apple computer text character encoding

The Macintosh Turkic Cyrillic encoding is used in Apple Macintosh computers to represent texts in the Cyrillic script for Turkic languages. It was created by Michael Everson for use in his fonts, but is not an official Mac OS Codepage. It supports Azerbaijani, Bashkir, Kazakh, Kyrgyz, Mongolian, Tajik, Tatar, Turkmen, and Uzbek. Also possibly supports Russian, Bulgarian and Belarusian.

Each character is shown with its equivalent Unicode code point. Only the second half of the table (code points 128–255) is shown, the first half (code points 0–127) being the same as ASCII.

Macintosh Turkic Cyrillic
	0	1	2	3	4	5	6	7	8	9	A	B	C	D	E	F
8x	А	Б	В	Г	Д	Е	Ж	З	И	Й	К	Л	М	Н	О	П
9x	Р	С	Т	У	Ф	Х	Ц	Ч	Ш	Щ	Ъ	Ы	Ь	Э	Ю	Я
Ax	Ҳ	ҳ	Ӯ	£	§	•	¶	І	®	©	™	Җ	җ	Ұ	Ғ	ғ
Bx	Ҹ	ҹ	Ү	ү	і	Ә	ӯ	Ј	Ө	ө	Ӣ	ӣ	Ҡ	ҡ	Ң	ң
Cx	ј	Ҙ	Һ	Ҷ	ҷ	ә	һ	«	»	…	NBSP	Ҝ	ҝ	Қ	қ	ҙ
Dx	–	—	“	”	‘	’	ұ	„	Ў	ў	Ҫ	ҫ	№	Ё	ё	я
Ex	а	б	в	г	д	е	ж	з	и	й	к	л	м	н	о	п
Fx	р	с	т	у	ф	х	ц	ч	ш	щ	ъ	ы	ь	э	ю	€ (Note: Redefined in Mac OS 8.5, earlier this was the currency symbol ¤, U+00A4)
Differences from MacCyrillic
