= Epsilon (Cyrillic) =

Cyrillic letter used for /ɛ~æ/ in Enets

- Ԑ ԑ

Usage
- Writing system: Cyrillic
- Type: Alphabetic
- Language of origin: Enets
- Sound values: /ɛ/~/æ/
- In Unicode: U+0510, U+0511

History
Development
A28
        - Ε ε ϵ
          - Ɛ ɛ
            - Ԑ ԑ

Cyrillic epsilon (Ԑ ԑ; italics: Ԑ ԑ, also called reversed ze) is a letter of the Cyrillic script. Its form is a reversed Cyrillic letter Ze (З з З з). It resembles the Latin letter epsilon (Ɛ ɛ) and the Greek letter Epsilon (Ε ε), as well as a hand-written form of the uppercase Latin E and Cyrillic letter Ye. Reversed Ze was added to the Unicode 5.0 Standard, but is still uncommon in most Cyrillic fonts.

Cyrillic epsilon is used in Enets, where it represents /ɛ~æ/ (like the e in bet or the a in ant). It has also been used in the Khanty language as a variant of Ukrainian Ye (Є є).

== Computing codes ==
Character information
Preview	Ԑ		ԑ	
Unicode name	CYRILLIC CAPITAL LETTER; REVERSED ZE		CYRILLIC SMALL LETTER; REVERSED ZE	
Encodings	decimal	hex	dec	hex
Unicode	1296	U+0510	1297	U+0511
UTF-8	212 144	D4 90	212 145	D4 91
Numeric character reference	&#1296;	&#x510;	&#1297;	&#x511;

== See also ==
- Cyrillic characters in Unicode
