= E (Cyrillic) =

Letter of the Cyrillic script

- Э э

Usage
- Writing system: Cyrillic
- Type: Alphabetic
- Sound values: [e], [ɛ]
- In Unicode: U+042D, U+044D

History
- Development: Ε ε: Е е; Є є; Э э
- Transliterations: E e

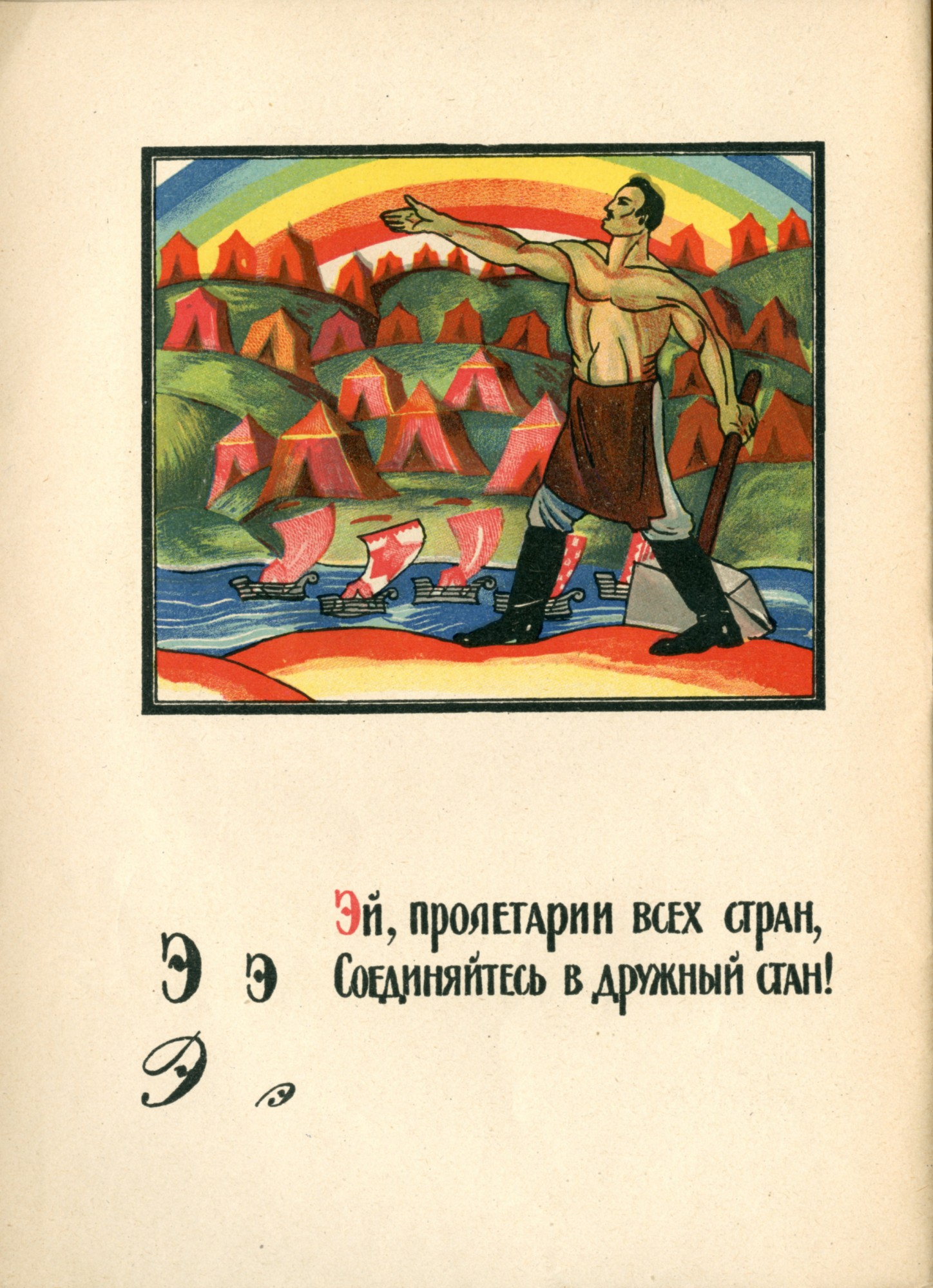
E, from the Alphabet Book оf the Red Army Soldier (1921)

E (Э э; italics: Э э or Э э; italics: Э э); also known as backwards e, from Russian э оборо́тное, e oborótnoye, [ˈɛ ɐbɐˈrotnəjə] is a letter found in three Slavic languages: Russian, Belarusian, and West Polesian. It represents the vowels [e] and [ɛ], as the e in the word "editor". In other Slavic languages that use the Cyrillic script, the sounds are represented by Ye (Е е), which in Russian and Belarusian represents [je] in initial and postvocalic position or [e] with palatalization of the preceding consonant. This letter closely resembles and should not be confused with the older Cyrillic letter Ukrainian Ye (Є є), of which Э is a backwards version.

In Cyrillic Moldovan, which was used in the Moldovan SSR during the Soviet Union and is still used in Transnistria, the letter corresponds to ă in the Latin Romanian alphabet, and the phoneme [ə]. It is also used in the Cyrillic alphabets used by Mongolian and many Uralic, Caucasian and Turkic languages of the former Soviet Union.

== Origin ==
The letter ⟨э⟩ originated in the thirteenth century as a variant of ⟨є⟩, at first, according to Đorđić in superscripted line-final position, but by the end of the century elsewhere as well. In the following centuries it continued to appear sporadically as an uncommon variant of ⟨є⟩, but not later than in the fifteenth century amongst the Eastern Slavs it began to be used to indicate initial (uniotated) [e]. According to Yefim Karskiy, "Western Russian ustav knows ⟨э⟩, e.g. in Miscellany of the 15th c. from the Public Library (manuscr. #391) (экъсеквїє, это etc.), chronicles of 15th-16th cc., Miscellany of Poznań (16th c.), Statut of 1588... It is difficult to say whether it has been developed here independently or it came from South Slavic manuscripts, where ⟨э⟩ occurs as early as in 13-14th cc." Although the revision of Meletius Smotrytsky’s grammar published in Moscow in 1648 does not include ⟨э⟩ in its alphabet, it does consistently write Этѷмолѻ́гїа (Etymologia), in contrast to Єтѷмоло́ґїѧ in the first edition of 1619. It was by no means confined to this function in the period, however, as the prevalent spellings реэстръ, маэоръ (beside маеоръ, маіоръ) for modern Russian реестр, майор demonstrate.

== Usage ==
=== In modern Russian ===
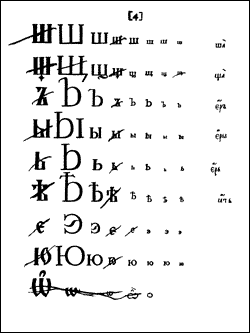
Specimens of the civil script with annotations by Peter I.

In the specimens of the civil script presented to Peter I in 1708, forms of ⟨э⟩ were included among forms of ⟨є⟩, but the latter was deleted by Peter. The former was used in some early 18th-century Russian texts, but some authorities of the period considered it superfluous, like Mikhail Lomonosov, on the grounds that "the letter Е, having several different pronunciations, could serve in the pronoun етотъ and the interjection ей" and that it was inappropriate to introduce letters solely for use in loanwords. However, the inclusion of ⟨Э⟩ in its modern function, in the Russian Academy's Dictionary of 1789–94, marks the point from which it can be considered as an established part of the Russian orthographical standard.

There were still some objections to the letter even as late as 1817, when M. T. Kačenovskij was questioning whether "yet another hard э" was necessary when the language already had "a soft ѣ and a hard е".

In contemporary Russian, ⟨э⟩ is used to represent [e], [ɛ] in initial position (электричество 'electricity') and postvocalic position (дуэль 'duel'). Among such words are only a few native Russian roots: эт- (это 'this is', этот/эта/это 'this (m./f./n.)', эти 'these', поэтому 'thus' etc.), эк- (экий 'what a'), эдак-/этак- (эдак/этак 'like that', эдакий/этакий 'sort of') and a few interjections like эй 'hey', э 'uh'.

Even though Russian contains a significant number of loanwords in which [e] occurs after a hard (unpalatalised) consonant, it is still the practice to use the letter ⟨е⟩ for [e], [ɛ]: теннис, сепсис (tennis, sepsis). There are few traditional exceptions to that practice among common noun loanwords:

- the original list (the first half of the 20th century) contained just three words:
  - мэр 'mayor', from French 'maire'
  - пэр 'peer (a noble)', from French 'pair'
  - сэр 'sir', from English or from Old French 'sieur'
- two later additions (1950s-1960s):
  - мэтр 'master, skilled artist', from French 'maître'
  - пленэр, from French '(en) plein air'
- new additions (1980s and later) are more numerous:
  - рэкет 'racket, racketeering', from English
  - рэп 'rap (music)', from English
  - фэнтези 'fantasy (literature)', from English
  - and several others; spelling of new words sometimes varies and dictionaries often give variants or contradict one another (like хетчбэк 'hatchback (car)' in spelling dictionary vs хетчбек/хэтчбек in explanatory dictionary ).

In proper nouns, however, ⟨э⟩ may occur after consonants: Улан-Удэ 'Ulan-Ude' and Блэр 'Blair'. However, many such loanwords are spelled with ⟨е⟩: Блерио 'Blériot' (a French aviator). That is the case especially for names that entered the language centuries ago like: Берлин, 'Berlin'. The use of ⟨э⟩ is much more frequent for names from non-European languages: Мао Цзэдун 'Mao Zedong'.

The letter ⟨э⟩ is also used in Russian to render initial œ in foreign words: thus Eure (the river in France) is written Эр. After consonants this is transcribed as ⟨ё⟩. In the 19th century, some writers used ⟨ӭ⟩ for that sound in both positions, but that was never accepted as standard orthography. (The letter ⟨ӭ⟩ was re-invented in the 20th century for Kildin Sami.) It is also used to represent a stressed /æ/ in languages such as English, which can cause a problem of conflating /æ/ with English /ɛ/ (for example, "Addison" and "Edison" would be spelled the same). However, in other positions, Russian also uses ⟨а⟩ for /æ/ and ⟨е⟩ for /ɛ/.

=== In modern Belarusian ===
Unlike Russian, Belarusian has many native words in which it occurs after a hard consonant. Moreover, its orthography was standardized later than that of Russian (which reached its present form at the beginning of the 20th century), on the basis of the spoken language rather than historical tradition. Consequently, ⟨э⟩ and ⟨е⟩ are written in accordance with pronunciation: ⟨э⟩ for initial [e] and after hard consonants, ⟨е⟩ for initial and postvocalic [je] and after soft consonants. That also means that ⟨э⟩ is much more frequent in Belarusian than in Russian.

=== In other languages ===
In Tuvan the Cyrillic letter can be written as a double vowel.

In the Tajik language, the letters е and э have the same function, except that э is used at the beginning of a word (ex. Эрон, "Iran").

In Mongolian, э is the standard letter to represent the /ɛ/ phoneme. When doubled, it represents the /eː/ phoneme. Е, however, is only used in the few Mongolian words containing it, Russian loanwords and Russian-style transcriptions of foreign names.

== Related letters and other similar characters ==
- Е е : Cyrillic letter Ye
- Є є : Cyrillic letter Ukrainian Ye
- Ε ε : Greek letter Epsilon
- E e : Latin letter E
- É é : Latin letter E with acute
- Ė ė : Latin letter E with overdot - a Lithuanian letter
- ℈ : Scruple (Apothecaries' system)
- € : Euro Sign

== Computing codes ==
Character information
Preview	Э		э	
Unicode name	CYRILLIC CAPITAL LETTER E		CYRILLIC SMALL LETTER E	
Encodings	decimal	hex	dec	hex
Unicode	1069	U+042D	1101	U+044D
UTF-8	208 173	D0 AD	209 141	D1 8D
Numeric character reference	&#1069;	&#x42D;	&#1101;	&#x44D;
Named character reference	&Ecy;		&ecy;	
KOI8-R and KOI8-U	252	FC	220	DC
Code page 855	248	F8	247	F7
Code page 866	157	9D	237	ED
Windows-1251	221	DD	253	FD
ISO-8859-5	205	CD	237	ED
Macintosh Cyrillic	157	9D	253	FD
