= Ye (Cyrillic) =

Cyrillic letter

Ye/E/Ie (есть)
- Е е

Usage
- Writing system: Cyrillic
- Type: Alphabetic
- Language of origin: Old Church Slavonic
- Sound values: [e], [ɛ], [ɪ̞], [je], [jɛ], [jɪ̞], [ji~jɵ]
- In Unicode: U+0415, U+0435
- Alphabetical position: 6

History
Development
A28
    - Ε ε
      - Е е
- Descendants: Є є, Ё ё
- Transliterations: ye, e, ie, je

Other
- Associated numbers: 5 (Cyrillic numerals)

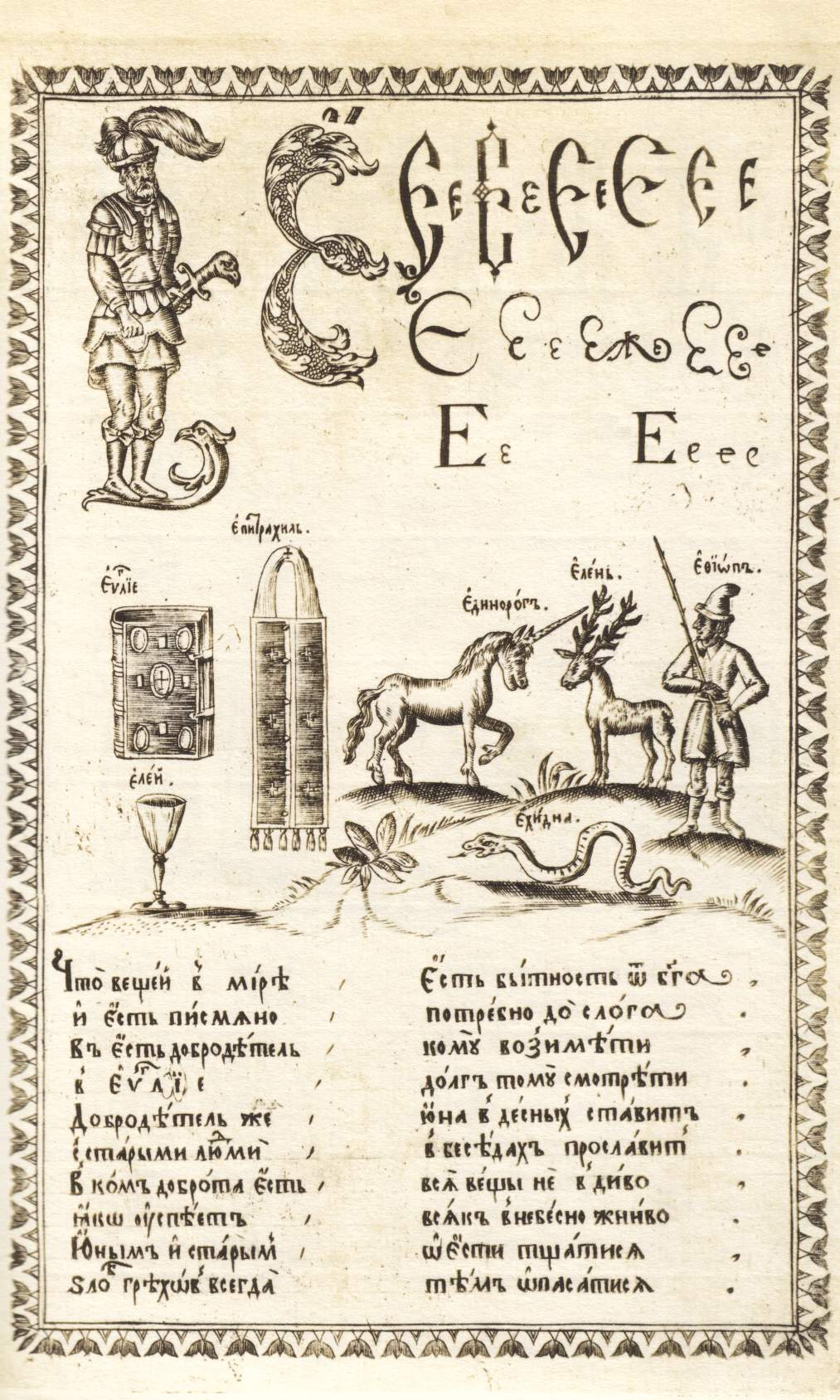
Ye, from Karion Istomin's alphabet book (1694)

E (Е е; italics: Е е or Е е; italics: Е е), known in Russian and Belarusian as Ye, Je, or Ie, is a letter of the Cyrillic script. In some languages this letter is called E. It commonly represents the vowel [e] or [ɛ], like the pronunciation of ⟨e⟩ in "yes". It was derived from the Phoenician letter he Greek letter epsilon (Ε ε), and the shape is very similar to the Latin letter E or another version of E (Cyrillic).

Ye is romanized using the Latin letter E for Bulgarian, Serbian, Macedonian, Ukrainian and Rusyn, and occasionally Russian (Озеро Байкал, Ozero Baykal), Je for Belarusian (Заслаўе, Zaslaŭje), Ye for Russian (Европа, Yevropa), and Ie occasionally for Russian (Днепр, Dniepr) and Belarusian (Маладзе́чна, Maladziečna).

== Usage ==
=== Russian and Belarusian ===
- At the beginning of a word or after a vowel, Ye represents the phonemic combination /je/ (phonetically [je] or [jɛ]), like the pronunciation of ⟨ye⟩ in "yes". Ukrainian uses the letter ⟨є⟩ (Ukrainian Ye) in this way.
- Following a consonant, Ye indicates that the consonant is palatalized, and represents the vowel /e/ (phonetically [e] or [ɛ]), like the pronunciation of ⟨e⟩ in "yes".

In Russian, the letter ⟨е⟩ can follow unpalatalized consonants, especially ⟨ж⟩, ⟨ш⟩, and ⟨ц⟩. In some loanwords, other consonants before ⟨е⟩ (especially ⟨т⟩, ⟨д⟩, ⟨н⟩, ⟨с⟩, ⟨з⟩, and ⟨р⟩) are also not palatalized, see E (Cyrillic). The letter ⟨е⟩ also represents /jo/ (as in "yogurt") and /o/ after palatalized consonants, ⟨ж⟩, and ⟨ш⟩. In these cases, the diaresis variant ⟨ё⟩ (yo) may be used. In unstressed syllables, ⟨e⟩ represents reduced vowels like [ɪ], see Russian phonology and Vowel reduction in Russian.

=== Bulgarian, Macedonian, Serbian, Montenegrin, Ukrainian and Rusyn ===
This letter is called E, and represents the vowel phoneme /e/ (phonetically [e] or [ɛ]), like the pronunciation of ⟨e⟩ in the word "set".

To transcribe a "ye" /jɛ/ phoneme in loanwords and foreign names for Bulgarian, it is spelled as йе, as in йена (yen).

In Serbian, Macedonian, and Montenegrin, the "ye" phoneme is transcribed as "је". In Ukrainian and Rusyn, "ye" is spelled as "є".

=== Mongolian ===
The letter represents the sound /jo/ (й+ө) at the beginning of words (yo represents /jɔ/) like ес (nine) and ерөнхийлөгч (president), and also represents /je/ at the beginning of some words and in the middle or end of words and /e/ in Russian loanwords and transcriptions of foreign names. Finally, it represents /i/ in the volitional forms of certain verbs like хүргэе and тэгье, etc.

=== Turkic languages and Tajik ===
In Turkic languages utilizing the Cyrillic script (such as Kazakh, Kyrgyz and Uzbek) and in Tajik, Ye is used to represent the phoneme e~ɛ, both word-finally and medially. Isolated, word-initially, or vowel-succeeding, this letter is substituted with the letter Э. If the letter Ye occurs word-initially, isolated, or vowel-succeeding, it represents the phoneme /je/~/jɛ/. This is done in imitation of the Russian usage, as many of these languages received Cyrillic orthographies as part of Russification in the Soviet Union.

== Related letters and other similar characters ==
- the Latin letter E
- the Latin letter É
- the Greek letter Ε
- Ukrainian Ye

== Computing codes ==
Character information
Preview	Е		е	
Unicode name	CYRILLIC CAPITAL LETTER IE		CYRILLIC SMALL LETTER IE	
Encodings	decimal	hex	dec	hex
Unicode	1045	U+0415	1077	U+0435
UTF-8	208 149	D0 95	208 181	D0 B5
Numeric character reference	&#1045;	&#x415;	&#1077;	&#x435;
Named character reference	&IEcy;		&iecy;	
KOI8-R and KOI8-U	229	E5	197	C5
Code page 855	169	A9	168	A8
Windows-1251	197	C5	229	E5
ISO-8859-5	181	B5	213	D5
Macintosh Cyrillic	133	85	229	E5
