= Yo (Cyrillic) =

Letter of the Cyrillic script

- Ё ё

Usage
- Writing system: Cyrillic
- Type: Alphabetic
- Sound values: [jo], [ʲo], [jɵ]

History
Development
A28
        - Ε ε
          - Е е
            - Ё ё
- Transliterations: yo, jo, io

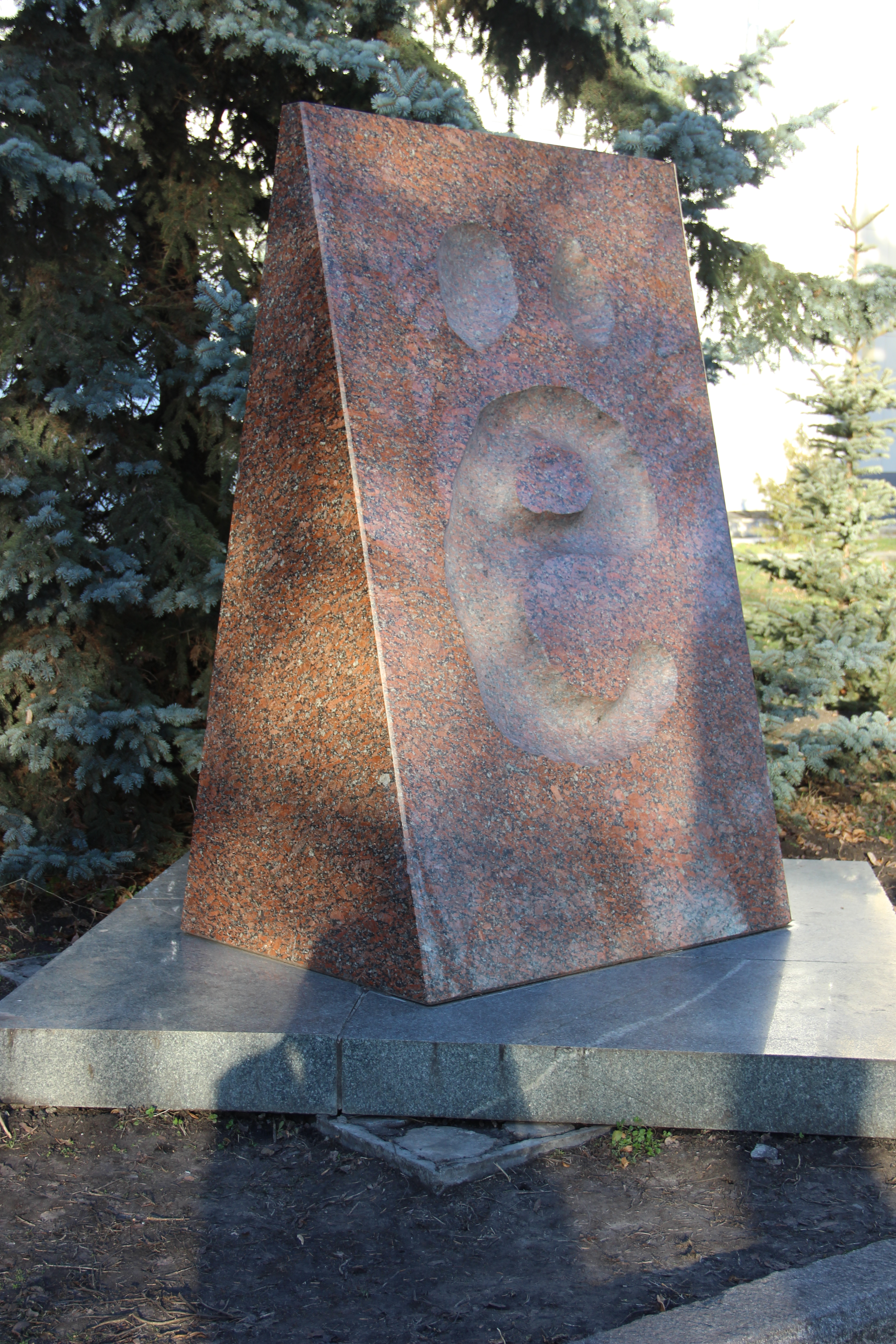
Monument in Ulyanovsk marking the 200th anniversary of the letter Yo.

Yo, Jo, or, Io (Ё ё; italics: Ё ё; Russian pronunciation: [jɵ]) is a letter of the Cyrillic script. In Unicode, the letter ⟨Ё⟩ is named CYRILLIC CAPITAL/SMALL LETTER IO.

In English, the letter Yo is romanized using the Latin ë (according to the ALA–LC and British Standards), ë (yë word-initially) (BGN/PCGN) or yo/jo (orthographic transcription) for Russian, and as i͡o (ALA–LC), yo (BGN/PCGN), or ë (BSI) for Belarusian. In international systems, Yo is romanized as ë (ISO 9).

It was derived from the Cyrillic letter Ye (Е е).

== Pronunciation ==
This section describes the pronunciation in Russian and Belarusian. Other languages may have subtle differences.

The letter ⟨ё⟩ occurs in a stressed syllable in the overwhelming majority of Russian and Belarusian words. In Russian, unstressed ⟨ё⟩ occurs only in compound numerals and a few derived terms, where it is considered an exception.

It is a so-called iotated vowel. At the start of a word or after a vowel, it represents the consonant-vowel sequence /jo/, like in 'York'. The same applies if ⟨ё⟩ is preceded by either ⟨ъ⟩ or ⟨ь⟩.

After a consonant letter, the letter ⟨ё⟩ indicates the phoneme /o/ together with palatalization of the preceding consonant (if it can be palatalized). No /j/ sound occurs between the consonant and the vowel in this case.

The exact pronunciation of the vowel sound of ⟨ё⟩ can vary because of allophony in Slavic languages. In Russian, it is pronounced [jɵ], with an [ɵ] vowel similar to bird in New Zealand or South African English; see palatalization for some background.

== Usage ==
Yo was first used in Russian, but its status in that language is now ambiguous. Yo occurs as a discrete letter in the Cyrillic alphabets of Belarusian, Rusyn, Mongolian and many Caucasian and Turkic languages.

=== Russian ===
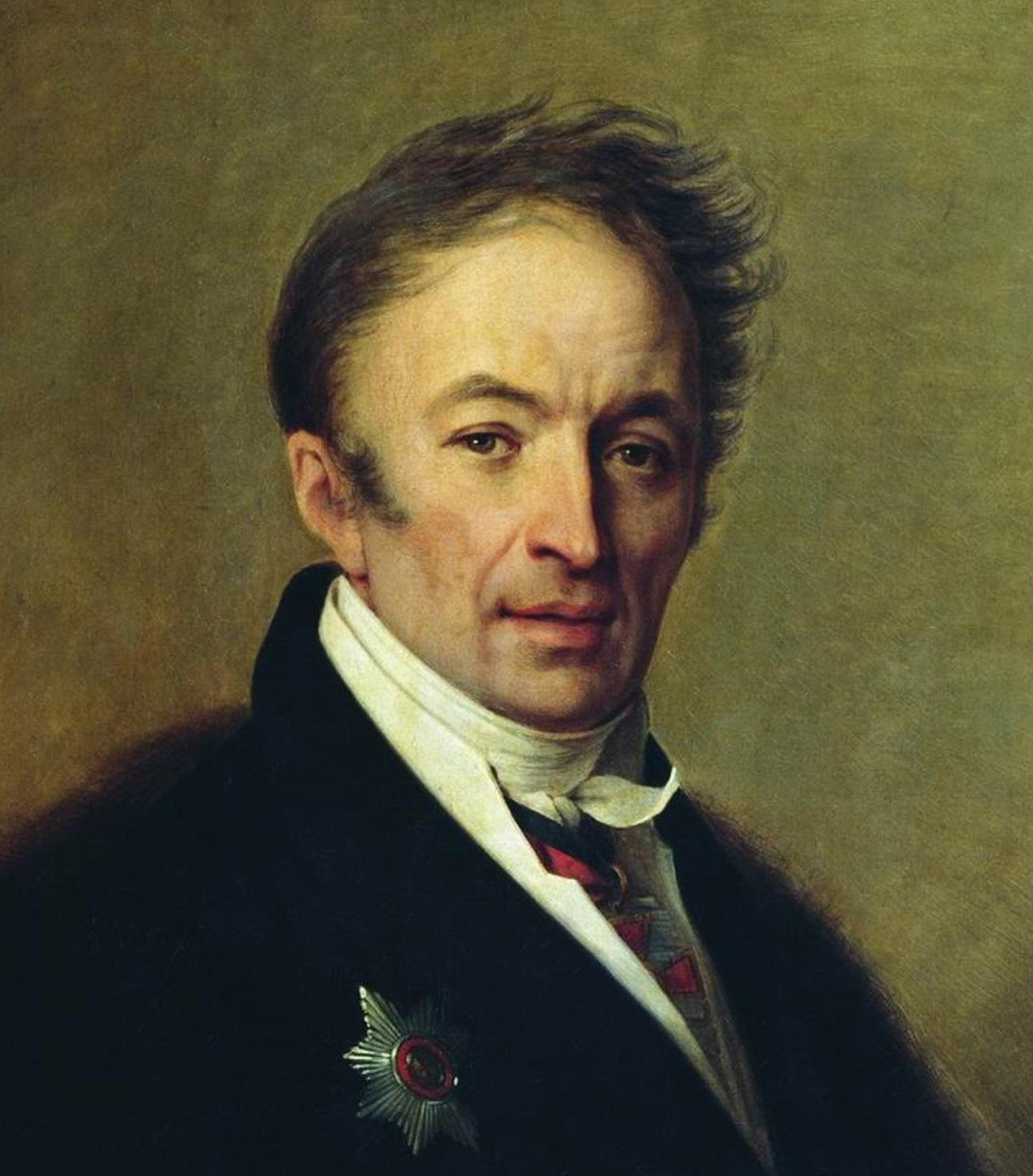
Russian writer Nikolay Karamzin created the letter ё

The letter Yo or Jo is the seventh letter of the alphabet, but although it indicates a distinct sound from Ye, it is often treated as the same letter for alphabetisation and sorting. In the dictionary, ёж (hedgehog) comes after едо́к (eater) and before е́здить (to go).

⟨Ё⟩ represents the phoneme /o/ after /j/ or a soft consonant (or occasionally after ⟨ж⟩, ⟨ш⟩), and is almost always stressed. It alternates with ⟨е⟩, written in non-stressed positions. Unstressed ⟨ё⟩ appears only in compound words (in this case it may be considered to have secondary stress; most notably, ⟨ё⟩ occurs in words containing the prefixes трёх- 'three-' and четырёх- 'four-'), in derivatives of the name of the letter ⟨ё⟩ itself (ёфика́тор - yoficator), in loanwords (кёнигсбе́ргский - adjective from Königsberg, сёрфинги́ст from surfing - surfer, сёдзё - shōjo, гёмбёц - gömböc).

In modern Russian, Common Slavonic /e/ in a stressed syllable generally became /o/ after a palatalized consonant, unless the vowel was followed by a second palatalized consonant. (Note: Or Common Slavonic /e/ generally became modern Russian /jo/ when stressed and not followed by a palatalized consonant.) For example, compare ёж [jɵʂ] ("hedgehog") from *ežь in contrast to лещ [lʲeɕː] ("bream") from *leščь; or осётр [ɐˈsʲɵtr] ("sturgeon") from *esetrъ in contrast to осeть [ɐˈsʲetʲ] ("granary, rack for drying grain") from *esetь. (Note: A rare exception to this rule is тётя [ˈtʲɵtʲə] "aunt" from CSl. *teta. Sometimes, /o/ between palatalized consonants occurs because of morphological analogy: e.g. клён [klʲɵn] "maple", prepositional case (о) клёне [(ɐ) klʲɵnʲe], the stressed feminine instrumental ending -ёй [ʲɵj] ~ -ёю [ʲɵjʊ] by analogy with -óй [oj] ~ -óю [ojʊ], and the stressed second-person plural verbal ending -ёте [ʲɵtʲe] by analogy with -ёшь [ʲɵʂ] (2p, sg.), -ёт [ʲɵt] (3p, sg.), and -ём [ʲɵm] (1p, pl.).) However, since the sound change took place after the introduction of writing, the letter ⟨е⟩ continued to be written in that position.

For a long time, no distinction was made in written Russian between the vowels /e/ and /o/ after /j/ or after a palatalized (soft) consonant. It was not until the 18th century that efforts were made to create a distinct spelling for /jo/ or /ʲo/. From the mid-1730s, there was sporadic use of a digraph ⟨іо⟩, or alternatively a ligature with a top joiner ⟨і͡о⟩, but this was cumbersome and used rarely. This digraph and a new letter ⟨ґ⟩ for the sound /ɡ/ were proposed as additions to the official alphabet in 1783 at a session of the Russian Academy under the presidency of Princess Yekaterina Romanovna Vorontsova-Dashkova, but both propositions were rejected by the academicians and the Metropolitan of Novgorod and Saint Petersburg Gavriil. At that time, the sounds /jo/—/ʲo/ and /ɡ/ were common in everyday Central Russian speech, but Church-Slavonic-styled pronunciation with /je/–/ʲe/ and /ɣ/ was preferred when reading literary texts. Other variant spellings used for /jo/ or /ʲo/ were о, ьо, їô, ió, ио.

In 1797, instead of existing options, the letter "Ё" was created by Russian Imperial historian, writer, poet and critic Nikolay Mikhailovich Karamzin. It was used for the first time in the 2nd book of "Aonides" in his poem "Sophistiated Solomon's Wisdom, or Thoughts Selected from Ecclesiastes" to create a rhyme between the words слёзы [ˈslʲɵzɨ] and розы [ˈrozɨ]. In other places of the poem he used the spelling слезы [ˈslʲezɨ].

The diaeresis ◌̈ does not appear above any other letter in Russian. It serves no purpose except to differentiate between ⟨е⟩ and ⟨ё⟩.

Except for a brief period after World War II, the use of ⟨ё⟩ was never obligatory in standard Russian orthography. By and large, it is used only in dictionaries and in pedagogical literature intended for children and students of Russian as a second language. Otherwise, ⟨е⟩ is used, and ⟨ё⟩ occurs only when it is necessary to avoid ambiguity (such as to distinguish between все ("everybody") and всё ("everything") when it is not obvious from the context) or in words (principally proper nouns) whose pronunciation may not be familiar to the reader. Recent recommendations (2006) from the Russian Language Institute are to use ⟨ё⟩ in proper nouns to avoid an incorrect pronunciation. It is permitted, however, to mark ⟨ё⟩ whenever it occurs, which is the preference of some Russian authors and periodicals.

The fact that ⟨ё⟩ is frequently replaced with ⟨е⟩ in print often causes some confusion to both Russians and non-Russians, as it makes it more difficult for Russian words and names to be transcribed. One recurring problem is with Russian surnames, as both -ев (-ev/-yev) and -ёв (-yov/-ov) are common endings. Thus, the English-speaking world knows two leaders of the former Soviet Union as Khrushchev and Gorbachev, but their surnames end in Russian with -ёв, better transcribed -yov/-ov (which is why many English-speakers pronounce these names as if they end in -ov but they spell them with -ev).

The advent of the computer has had a great influence on the process of substitution ⟨ё⟩ with ⟨е⟩ for a counterintuitive reason: currently, the Russian alphabet contains 33 letters including ⟨ё⟩, and codepage designers usually prefer to omit ⟨ё⟩ so that all Russian letters can be placed into sections of 16 letters (16, like other powers of 2, is often preferred in computing over other numbers). Some examples are pre-Unicode character pages 866 for Microsoft DOS and 1251 for Microsoft Windows. Since in both cases, ⟨ё⟩ was placed outside its alphabetically correct position, it made text sorting more complex. Software developers would then choose to substitute all ⟨ё⟩ letters with ⟨е⟩ at an early stage of text processing to simplify later stages.

==== Transcription of foreign words ====
⟨Ё⟩ can be used in Russian transcription of foreign words originating from languages that use the sound /ø/ or /œ/, spelled eu/ö/ő/ø (French, Germanic languages other than English, Uralic languages), such as "Gerhard Schröder", whose last name is transliterated as Шрёдер because of its similarity to the native Russian sound [ɵ]. This letter is also often used for transcribing the English vowel /ɜr/, in names like Роберт Бёрнс for "Robert Burns" or Хёрст for "Hearst"/"Hurst"/"Hirst". However, several authoritative sources recommend the transcription ер for /ɜr/. Word-initial and post-vocalic /ø/ or /œ/ is usually transcribed ⟨э⟩ in Russian (but ⟨o⟩ in names from Turkic languages).

However, the sound [jo], in words from European languages, is normally transcribed into Russian as ⟨йо⟩ in initial and post-vocalic position and ⟨ьo⟩ after consonants: Нью-Йорк for "New York" and батальон for "battalion". An apparent exception is the Russian word for "serious", which is spelled серьёзный rather than сериозный. However, this is due to the fact that this word stems from French sérieux with an /ø/ sound. (In the 19th and the early 20th century, both spellings were in use. The spelling with ⟨ио⟩ —⟨іо⟩ in the pre-1918 orthography— was based on Latin seriosus.)

The letter ⟨ё⟩ is normally used to transcribe the Japanese ⟨よ⟩ into Russian Cyrillic, appearing in the Russian transcription of Japanese that would appear as yo (よ), kyo (きょ), sho (しょ) etc. in Hepburn Romanization, but there are a few traditional spellings which break this rule. For example, "Yokohama" is spelled in Russian with ⟨Ио⟩, not ⟨Ё⟩. Similarly, ⟨ё⟩ is used to transcribe into Russian Cyrillic the Korean sounds romanized as ⟨yo⟩, and confusingly also for ⟨yeo⟩ with the same letter. In such transcriptions, as well as in languages other than Russian where ё is used, the use of ё rather than е is obligatory.

The ⟨ё⟩-less Bulgarian uses ⟨ьo⟩ /ʲo/ (after consonants) and ⟨йo⟩ /jo/ (word-initial and after vowels) for transcribing the foreign vowels /ø/ or /œ/, and also for French labialized schwa: "de" and "le" are transcribed де and ле in Russian but дьо and льо in Bulgarian.

However, in Ukrainian (which also lacks the letter ⟨ё⟩ and uses ⟨йo⟩ for /jo/ and ⟨ьo⟩ for /ʲo/), the standard way for transcribing /ø/ or /œ/ in foreign names is ⟨е⟩ /e/.

==== Legal issues ====
It is thought that the letter ⟨ё⟩ is found in at least 2500 surnames used in Russia and other states of the former USSR. It is common for a person who has one of these surnames to possess some legal documents (passports, identification cards, marriage and birth certificates, property ownership papers, etc.) where the name is written with a ⟨ё⟩, and some that use the simple ⟨е⟩ instead. In other situations, a child's birth certificate may have a ⟨ё⟩ and the parents' identity papers all have ⟨е⟩. On occasion such mismatches caused problems to citizens when receiving inheritances or completing property transactions.

=== Belarusian and Rusyn ===
Yo is the seventh letter of the Belarusian alphabet and the ninth letter of the Prešov Rusyn alphabet of Slovakia. In the Pannonian Rusyn alphabet, yo is absent.

In Belarusian and Prešov Rusyn, the letters ⟨е⟩ and ⟨ё⟩ are separate and not interchangeable.

=== Dungan ===
Unlike the Russian spelling system, ⟨ё⟩ is mandatory in the Cyrillic alphabet used by Dungan. In that Sinitic language, the ⟨е⟩/⟨ё⟩ distinction is crucial, as the former is used such as to write the syllable that would have the pinyin spelling of ye in Standard Chinese, and the latter is used for the syllable that appears as yao in pinyin. ⟨Ё⟩ is very prominent in Dungan spelling since the very common syllable appearing as yang in Pinyin is spelled ⟨ён⟩ in Dungan.

=== Mongolian ===
In the Cyrillic alphabet for the Mongolian language, ⟨ё⟩ is the seventh letter, and it is always different from ⟨е⟩. It represents the syllable /jɔ/. For example, the word for "two" in Mongolian, "khoyor", is spelled as хоёр.

=== Tajik ===
In the Tajik language, ⟨ё⟩ is used for the syllable /jɔː/.

=== Ukrainian ===
In some older alphabets used for Ukrainian, such as Panteleimon Kulish's Kulishivka's alphabet, ⟨ё⟩ was formerly used for the sound /jo/—/ʲo/. This letter no longer exists in the modern Ukrainian alphabet.

In modern Ukrainian spelling, the sound /jo/—/ʲo/ is written as ⟨ьо⟩ after soft consonants in the middle of words (such as "нього", "him" after a preposition), and ⟨йо⟩ elsewhere (such as "його", "him"). The standard way to transcribe the foreign phonemes /ø/ or /œ/ in Ukrainian is with the letter ⟨е⟩.

== Related letters and other similar characters ==
- Е е : Cyrillic letter Ye
- Ë ë : E with diaeresis - an Albanian and Kashubian letter
- Ε ε : Greek letter epsilon
- E e : Latin letter E
- Ɛ ɛ : Latin letter epsilon
- О о : Cyrillic letter O
- Ө ө : Cyrillic letter Oe
- Ӭ ӭ : Cyrillic letter E with diaeresis

== Computing codes ==
Character information
Preview	Ё		ё	
Unicode name	CYRILLIC CAPITAL LETTER IO		CYRILLIC SMALL LETTER IO	
Encodings	decimal	hex	dec	hex
Unicode	1025	U+0401	1105	U+0451
UTF-8	208 129	D0 81	209 145	D1 91
Numeric character reference	&#1025;	&#x401;	&#1105;	&#x451;
Named character reference	&IOcy;		&iocy;	
KOI8-R and KOI8-U	179	B3	163	A3
CP 866	240	F0	241	F1
Windows-1251	168	A8	184	B8
ISO 8859-5	161	A1	241	F1
Mac Cyrillic	221	DD	222	DE

== Computer Software ==
There are computer software or extension that is used to restore the Cyrillic letter Yo ⟨Ё⟩ in Russian texts in places where the letter Ye ⟨Е⟩ was used instead. ORFO and Yoficator are examples of such.

== See also ==
- Reforms of Russian orthography
- ORFO
- Yoficator
