= Mac OS Cyrillic encoding =

Character encoding on Macintosh computers

Mac OS Cyrillic
- Alias(es): x-mac-cyrillic Original version: Code page 1283, Code page 10007
- Languages: Russian, Bulgarian, Belarusian, Macedonian, Serbian (in Cyrillic script); Euro update: Ukrainian
- Created by: Apple, Inc.
- Classification: Extended ASCII, Mac OS script
- Extends: US-ASCII
- Based on: Euro update based on MacUkrainian, in turn based on original version. Non-letter characters mostly from Mac OS Roman.

Mac OS Cyrillic is a character encoding used on Apple Macintosh computers to represent texts in the Cyrillic script.

The original version lacked the letter Ґ, which is used in Ukrainian, although its use was limited during the Soviet era to regions outside Ukraine. The closely related MacUkrainian resolved this, differing only by replacing two less commonly used symbols with its uppercase and lowercase forms. The euro sign update of the Mac OS scripts incorporated these changes back into MacCyrillic.

Other related code pages include Mac OS Turkic Cyrillic and Mac OS Barents Cyrillic, introduced by Michael Everson in fonts for languages unsupported by standard MacCyrillic.

== Layout ==
Each character is shown with its equivalent Unicode code point and its decimal code point. Only the second half of the table (code points 128–255) is shown, the first half (code points 0–127) being the same as Mac OS Roman.

Mac OS Cyrillic
	0	1	2	3	4	5	6	7	8	9	A	B	C	D	E	F
8x	А	Б	В	Г	Д	Е	Ж	З	И	Й	К	Л	М	Н	О	П
9x	Р	С	Т	У	Ф	Х	Ц	Ч	Ш	Щ	Ъ	Ы	Ь	Э	Ю	Я
Ax	†	°	Ґ	£	§	•	¶	І	®	©	™	Ђ	ђ	≠	Ѓ	ѓ
Bx	∞	±	≤	≥	і	µ	ґ	Ј	Є	є	Ї	ї	Љ	љ	Њ	њ
Cx	ј	Ѕ	¬	√	ƒ	≈	∆	«	»	…	NBSP	Ћ	ћ	Ќ	ќ	ѕ
Dx	–	—	“	”	‘	’	÷	„	Ў	ў	Џ	џ	№	Ё	ё	я
Ex	а	б	в	г	д	е	ж	з	и	й	к	л	м	н	о	п
Fx	р	с	т	у	ф	х	ц	ч	ш	щ	ъ	ы	ь	э	ю	€

The following code points have been redefined since the original definition of the Macintosh Cyrillic encoding:

	A2	B6	FF
Macintosh Cyrillic before Mac OS 9.0 also Microsoft code page 10007 and IBM code page/CCSID 1283	¢	∂	¤
Macintosh Ukrainian before Mac OS 9.0 also Microsoft code page 10017 and FreeDOS code page 58627	Ґ	ґ	¤
Macintosh Cyrillic since Mac OS 9.0	Ґ	ґ	€
