= Reforms of Russian orthography =

Russian orthography has been reformed officially and unofficially by changing the Russian alphabet and spelling rules over the course of the history of the Russian language. Several important reforms happened in the 18th–20th centuries.

== Early changes ==
Old East Slavic adopted the Cyrillic script, approximately during the 10th century and at about the same time as the introduction of Eastern Christianity into the territories inhabited by the Eastern Slavs. No distinction was drawn between the vernacular language and the liturgical, though the latter was based on South Slavic rather than Eastern Slavic norms. As the language evolved, several letters, notably the yuses (Ѫ, Ѭ, Ѧ, Ѩ) were gradually and unsystematically discarded from both secular and church usage over the next centuries.

The emergence of the centralized Russian state in the 15th and 16th centuries, the consequent rise of the state bureaucracy along with the development of the common economic, political and cultural space necessitated the standardization of the language used in administrative and legal affairs. It was due to that reason that the earliest attempts at standardizing Russian, both in terms of the vocabulary and in terms of the orthography, were made initially based on the so-called Moscow chancery language. From then and on the underlying logic of language reforms in Russia reflected primarily the considerations of standardizing and streamlining language norms and rules in order to ensure the language's role as a practical tool of communication and administration.

== 18th-century changes ==
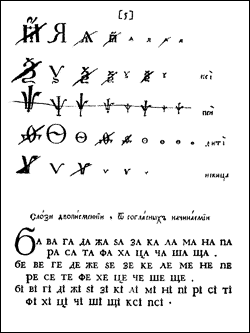
Peter I made the final choices of letter-forms by crossing out the undesirable ones in a set of charts

The printed Russian alphabet began to assume its modern shape when Peter I introduced his "civil script" (гражданский шрифт) type reform in 1708. The reform was not specifically orthographic in nature. However, with the replacement of Ѧ with Я and the effective elimination of several letters (Ѯ, Ѱ, Ѡ) and all diacritics and accents (with the exception of й) from secular usage and the use of Arabic numerals instead of Cyrillic numerals there appeared for the first time a visual distinction between Russian and Church Slavonic writing. With the strength of the historic tradition diminishing, Russian spelling in the 18th century became rather inconsistent, both in practice and in theory, as Mikhail Lomonosov advocated a morphophonemic orthography and Vasily Trediakovsky a phonemic one.

== 19th-century changes ==
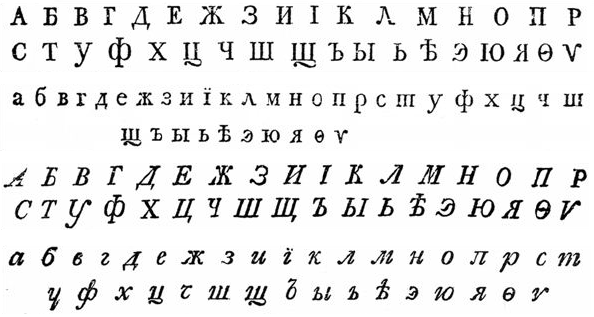
Civil Russian font from middle 18th and beginning of 19th centuries, without a yo (ё) or short i (й)

Throughout the 18th and 19th centuries, miscellaneous adjustments were made ad hoc, as the Russian literary language came to assume its modern and highly standardized form. These included:

- The introduction of the letter ё (yo).
- The nearly complete loss of ѵ, izhitsa, corresponding to the Greek upsilon υ and the Latin y, in favor of и or і (both of which represented /i/).
- The gradual loss of ѳ, fita, corresponding to the Greek theta θ, in favor of ф or т (Russian never had a voiceless dental fricative, which theta represents in Greek. The ѳ was pronounced as f and used only in foreign words, particularly Greek.)

By 1917, the only two words still spelled with ѵ in common use were мѵро (müro, [ˈmʲirə], 'chrism') and сѵнодъ (sünod, [sʲɪˈnot], 'synod'). The ѳ remained more common, though it became quite rare as a "Western" (French-like) pronunciation had been adopted for many words; for example, ѳеатръ (ḟeatr, [fʲɪˈatr], 'theater') became театръ (teatr, [tʲɪˈatr]).

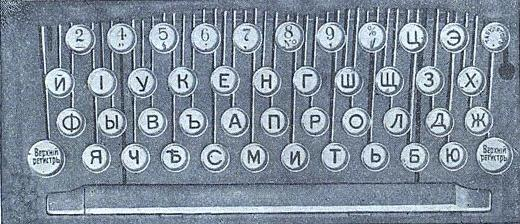
In early Russian typewriters like this one, there was no key for the digit 1, so the dotted І was used instead. Following the Russian alphabet reform of 1918, a 1 key was added.

Attempts to reduce spelling inconsistency culminated in the 1885 standard textbook of Yakov Karlovich Grot, which retained its authority through 21 editions until the Russian Revolution of 1917. His fusion of the morphological, phonetic, and historic principles of Russian orthography remains valid to this day, though both the Russian alphabet and the writing of many individual words have been altered through a complicated but extremely consistent system of spelling rules that tell which of two vowels to use under all conditions.

== Post-revolution reform ==
The most recent major reform of Russian spelling was prepared by Aleksey Shakhmatov and implemented shortly after the Bolshevik revolution of November 1917.

Shakhmatov headed the Assembly for Considering Simplification of the Orthography whose proposals of 11 May 1917 formed the basis of the new rules soon adopted by the Ministry of Popular Education.

=== Specific changes ===
The Old Cyrillic letter yat

Russian orthography was made simpler and easier by unifying several adjectival and pronominal inflections, conflating the letter ѣ with е, ѳ with ф, and і and ѵ with и. Additionally, the archaic mute yer became obsolete, including the ъ (the "hard sign") in final position following consonants (thus eliminating practically the last graphical remnant of the Old Slavonic open-syllable system). For instance, Рыбинскъ became Рыбинск ("Rybinsk").

Examples:

- дѣти to дети (children)
- Іисусъ Христосъ to Иисус Христос (Jesus Christ)
- мараѳонъ to марафон (marathon)
- Петроградъ to Петроград (Petrograd)
- раіонъ to район (region/district)
- Россія to Россия (Russia)
- Сѣверо-Американскіе Соединенные Штаты to Северо-Американские Соединённые Штаты – The United States of America (lit. 'North American United States', popular contemporary name of the United States in several European countries, including Russia)
- Сѵнодъ to Синод (synod)

According to the 19th-century spelling prescriptions, the genitive ending of adjectives and participles was spelled -аго (or -яго after soft consonants): добраго, синяго. In fact, those spellings come from Church Slavonic influence, as Old East Slavic documents mostly used -ого, -его. When those endings were stressed, some 19th-century grammarians prescribed the spelling -аго, while others prescribed -ого: живаго, слѣпаго or живого, слѣпого. However, in adjectival pronouns the ending was spelled -ого or -его: его, нашего, того, какого (except pronouns ending with -ый or -ій in the nominative: котораго, всякаго). The reform replaced the genitive adjectival ending -аго with -его after ж, ц, ч, ш, and щ (лучшаго → лучшего), in other instances -аго was replaced with -ого, and -яго with -его (for example: новаго → нового and ранняго → раннего), respectively. Although the letter г in those endings sounds as в in the standard Russian pronunciation, it was not changed by the reform.

19th-century spelling prescriptions distinguished feminine and neuter plural adjectival endings -ыя, -ія from masculine plural endings -ые, -іе (with no difference in pronunciation). Although Old East Slavic distinction of genders in the plural (masculine -ии, feminine -ыѣ, neuter -аꙗ) had died in speech long ago, 18th-century writers still tried to distinguish genders in the spelling, and Mikhail Lomonosov's variant was chosen as the standard. The reform gave the uniform -ые, -ие for all the three genders (новыя (книги, изданія) → новые).

19th-century spelling prescriptions gave the spellings онѣ, однѣ, однѣхъ, однѣмъ, однѣми for feminine plural forms, but они, одни, однихъ, однимъ, одними for masculine and neuter plural forms. Although these forms were prescribed to be pronounced differently, the difference was not usually observed in everyday speech; pronunciations were used interchangeably, the one with и being more common. The reform gave the uniform spelling они, одни, одних, одним, одними for all genders. However, when онѣ, однѣ were pronounced according to the spelling in poetic rhymes, modern editions write them as оне, одне.

19th-century spelling prescriptions gave the spelling of the feminine pronoun ея (нея) in the genitive case, but ее (нее) in the accusative case, whereas it was usually pronounced as её (неё) in both cases. The reform gave uniform spelling for both cases: ее (нее) (or её (неё), with the optional letter Ё). However, sometimes ея (нея) was pronounced according to the spelling in poetic rhymes. In that case, it is not changed in modern editions.

Prefixes ending with -з/с underwent a change: now all of them (except с-) end with -с before voiceless consonants and with -з before voiced consonants or vowels (разбить, разораться, but расступиться). Previously, the prefixes showed concurrence between phonetic (as now) and morphological (always з) spellings; at the end of the 19th century and the beginning of the 20th century the standard rule was: с-, без-, ч(е)рез- were always written in this way; other prefixes ended with с before voiceless consonants except с and with з otherwise (разбить, разораться, разступиться, but распасться). Earlier 19th-century works also sometimes used з before ц, ч, ш, щ.

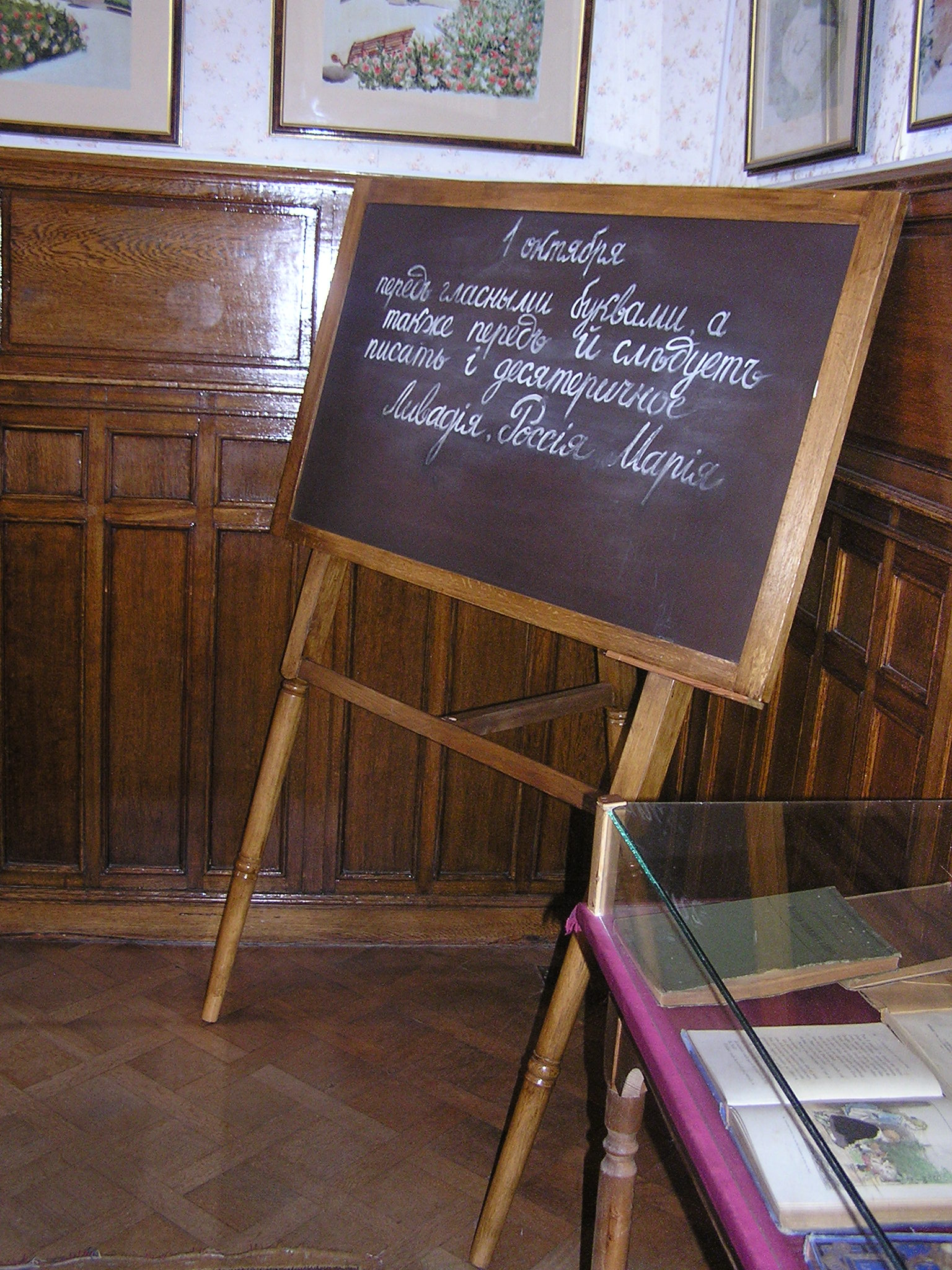
A blackboard with handwritten pre-revolutionary Russian

=== Practical implementation ===
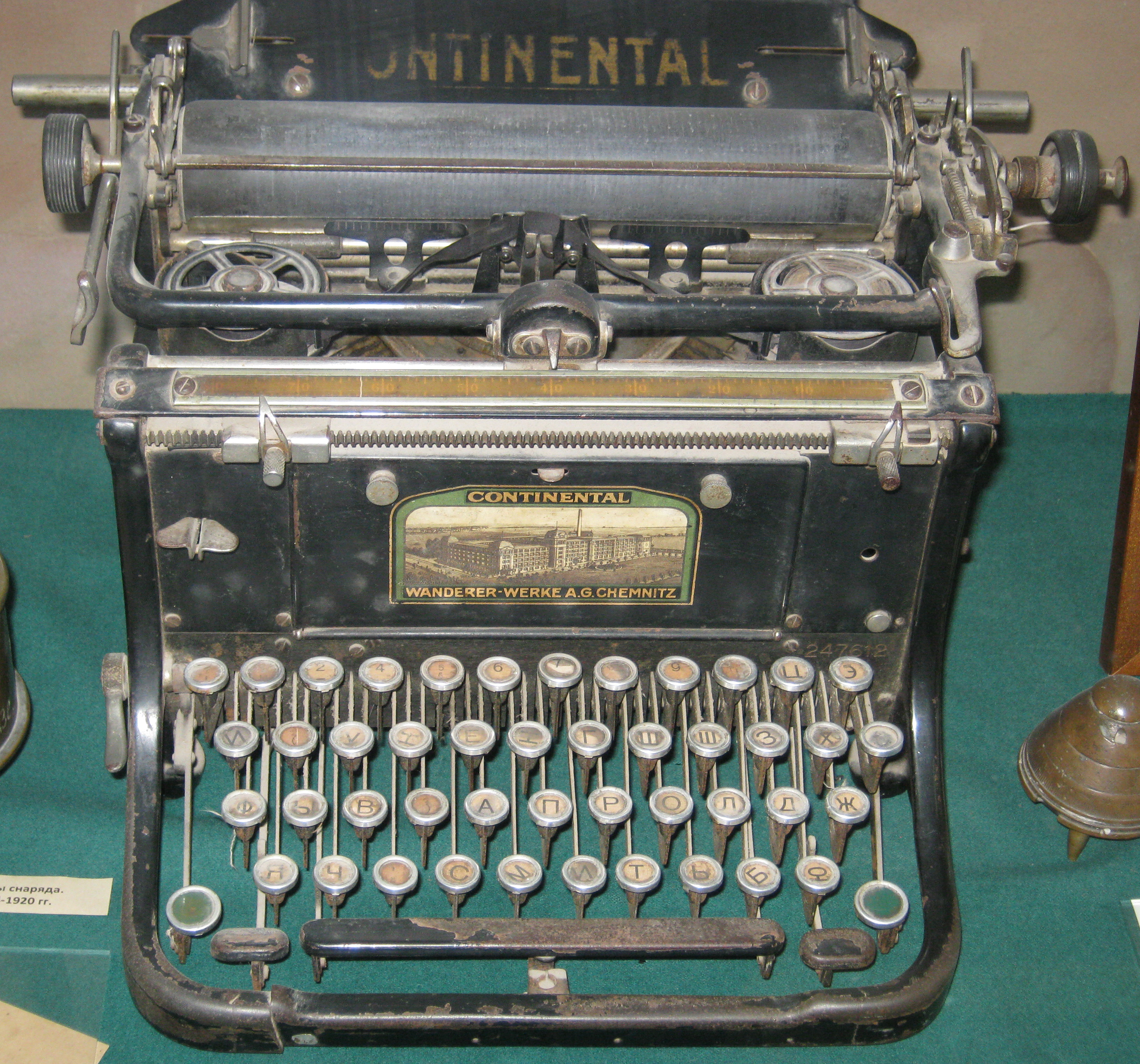
An old typewriter with the 'banned letters' removed

In December 1917, the People's Commissariat of Education, headed by A. V. Lunacharsky, issued a decree stating, "All state and government institutions and schools without exception should carry out the transition to the new orthography without delay. From 1 January 1918, all government and state publications, both periodical and non-periodical are to be printed in the new style." The decree was nearly identical to the proposals put forth by the May Assembly, and with other minor modifications formed the substance of the decree issued by the Soviet of People's Commissars in October 1918.

In this way, private publications could formally be printed using the old (or more generally, any convenient) orthography. The decree forbade the retraining of people previously trained under the old norm. A given spelling was considered incorrect only if it violated both the old and the new norms.

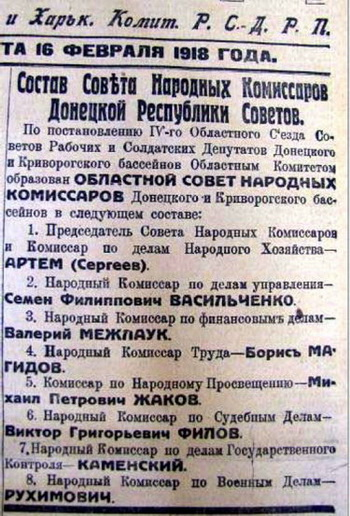
Early Soviet documents frequently mixed pre- and post-Revolution spelling

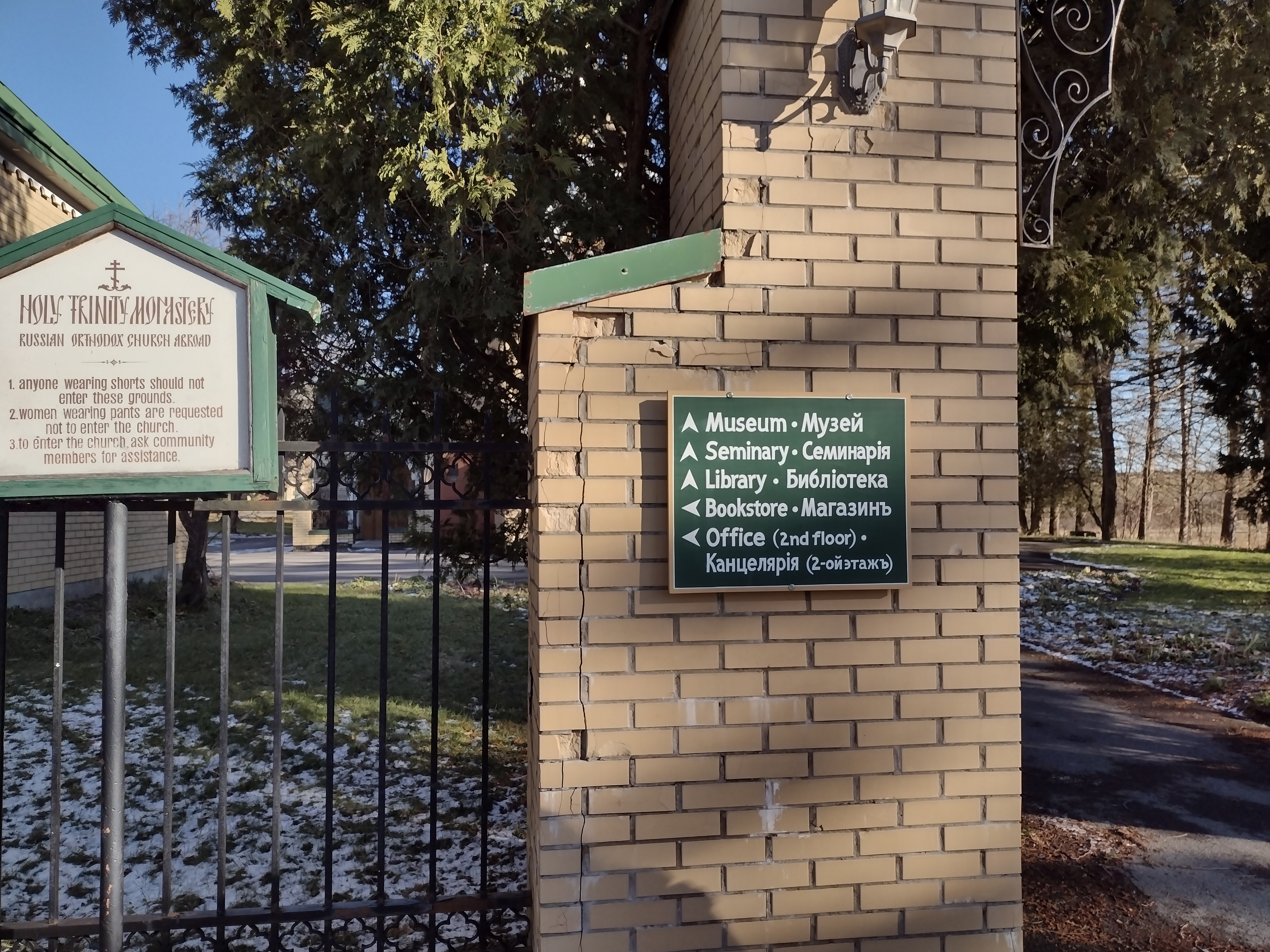
Pre-revolutionary orthography on signage at a Russian Orthodox monastery in the United States, photographed in 2021.

However, in practice, the Soviet government rapidly set up a monopoly on print production and kept a very close eye on the fulfillment of the edict. A common practice was the forced removal of not just the letters І, Ѳ, and Ѣ from printing offices, but also Ъ. Because of this, the usage of the apostrophe as a dividing sign became widespread in place of ъ (e.g., под'ём, ад'ютант instead of подъём, адъютант), and came to be perceived as a part of the reform (even if, from the point of view of the letter of the decree of the Council of People's Commissars, such uses were mistakes). Nonetheless, some academic printings (connected with the publication of old works, documents or printings whose typesettings predated the revolution) came out in the old orthography (except title pages and, often, prefaces) up until 1929.

Russian – and later Soviet – railroads operated locomotives with designations of "І", "Ѵ" and "Ѳ" (although the letter Ѵ was not mentioned in the spelling reform, contrary to the statement in the Great Soviet Encyclopedia, it had already become very rare prior to the revolution). Despite the altered orthography, the series names remained unchanged up until these locomotives were discontinued in the 1950s.

Some Russian émigré publications continued to appear in the former orthography until the 1970s.

=== Simplification ===
The reform reduced the number of orthographic rules having no support in pronunciation—for example, the difference of the genders in the plural and the need to learn a long list of words which were written with yats (the composition of said list was controversial among linguists, and different spelling guides contradicted one another).

The reform resulted in some economy in writing and typesetting, due to the exclusion of Ъ at the end of words—by the reckoning of Lev Uspensky, text in the new orthography was shorter by one-thirtieth.

The reform removed pairs of completely homophonous graphemes from the Russian alphabet (i.e., Ѣ and Е; Ѳ and Ф; and the trio of И, І and Ѵ), bringing the alphabet closer to the Russian language's actual phonological system.

=== Criticism ===
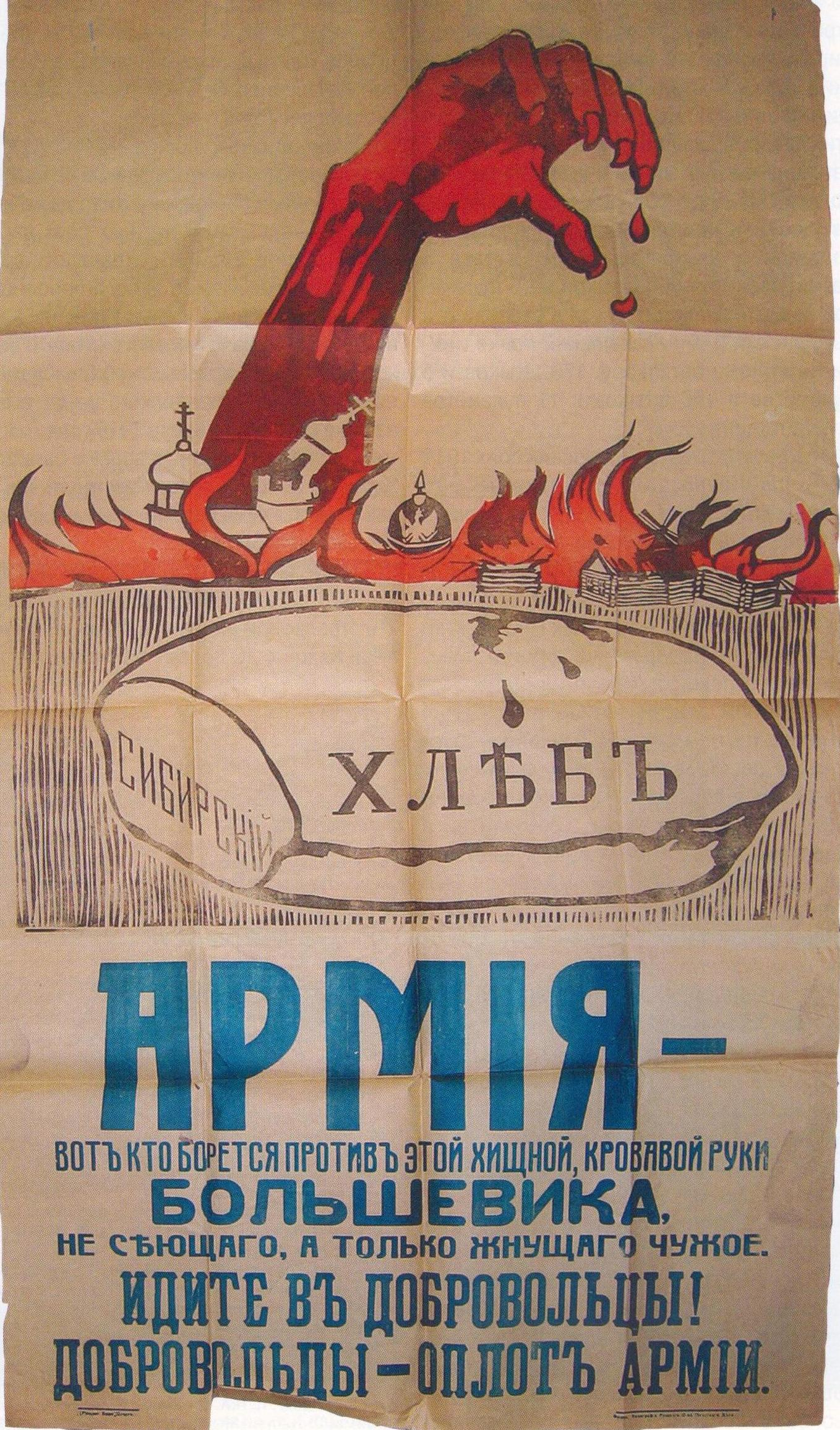
1919 White Army anti-Bolshevik poster encouraging people to enlist as volunteers, featuring continued use of the pre-reform spelling.

According to critics, the choice of Ии as the only letter to represent that sound and the removal of Іі defeated the purpose of 'simplifying' the language, as Ии occupies more space and, furthermore, is sometimes indistinguishable from Шш.

The reform also created many homographs and homonyms, which used to be spelled differently. Examples: есть/ѣсть (is/to eat) and миръ/міръ (peace/world) became есть and мир in both instances.

Replacement of онѣ, однѣ, ея by они, одни, её was especially controversial, as these feminine pronouns were deeply rooted in the language and extensively used by writers and poets.

=== Comparison ===
The following is the same opening paragraph from The Bronze Horseman by Alexander Pushkin in its original version (left) and post-reform version (right):

Original text in pre-reform Russian

На берегу пустынныхъ волнъ
Стоялъ онъ, думъ великихъ полнъ,
И вдаль глядѣлъ. Предъ нимъ широко
Рѣка неслася; бѣдный челнъ
По ней стремился одиноко.
По мшистымъ, топкимъ берегамъ
Чернѣли избы здѣсь и тамъ,
Пріютъ убогаго чухонца;
И лѣсъ, невѣдомый лучамъ
Въ туманѣ спрятаннаго солнца,
Кругомъ шумѣлъ.

[...]

Прошло сто лѣтъ, и юный градъ,
Полнощныхъ странъ краса и диво,
Изъ тьмы лѣсовъ, изъ топи блатъ
Вознесся пышно, горделиво;
Гдѣ прежде финскій рыболовъ,
Печальный пасынокъ природы,
Одинъ у низкихъ береговъ
Бросалъ въ невѣдомыя воды
Свой ветхой неводъ, нынѣ тамъ
По оживленнымъ берегамъ
Громады стройныя тѣснятся
Дворцовъ и башенъ; корабли
Толпой со всѣхъ концовъ земли
Къ богатымъ пристанямъ стремятся;
Въ гранитъ одѣлася Нева;
Мосты повисли надъ водами;
Темно-зелеными садами
Ея покрылись острова,
И передъ младшею столицей
Померкла старая Москва,
Какъ передъ новою царицей
Порфироносная вдова.

Люблю тебя, Петра творенье,
Люблю твой строгій, стройный видъ,
Невы державное теченье,
Береговой ея гранитъ,
Твоихъ оградъ узоръ чугунный,
Твоихъ задумчивыхъ ночей
Прозрачный сумракъ, блескъ безлунный,
Когда я въ комнатѣ моей
Пишу, читаю безъ лампады,
И ясны спящія громады
Пустынныхъ улицъ, и свѣтла
Адмиралтейская игла[...]

Красуйся, градъ Петровъ, и стой
Неколебимо какъ Россія,
Да умирится же съ тобой
И побѣжденная стихія;
Вражду и плѣнъ старинный свой
Пусть волны финскія забудутъ
И тщетной злобою не будутъ
Тревожить вѣчный сонъ Петра!

Translation:
Text in post-reform Russian

На берегу пустынных волн
Стоял он, дум великих полн,
И вдаль глядел. Пред ним широко
Река неслася; бедный чёлн
По ней стремился одиноко.
По мшистым, топким берегам
Чернели избы здесь и там,
Приют убогого чухонца;
И лес, неведомый лучам
В тумане спрятанного солнца,
Кругом шумел.

[...]

Прошло сто лет, и юный град,
Полнощных стран краса и диво,
Из тьмы лесов, из топи блат
Вознесся пышно, горделиво;
Где прежде финский рыболов,
Печальный пасынок природы,
Один у низких берегов
Бросал в неведомые воды
Свой ветхой невод, ныне там
По оживленным берегам
Громады стройные теснятся
Дворцов и башен; корабли
Толпой со всех концов земли
К богатым пристаням стремятся;
В гранит оделася Нева;
Мосты повисли над водами;
Темно-зелёными садами
Её покрылись острова,
И перед младшею столицей
Померкла старая Москва,
Как перед новою царицей
Порфироносная вдова.

Люблю тебя, Петра творенье,
Люблю твой строгий, стройный вид,
Невы державное теченье,
Береговой её гранит,
Твоих оград узор чугунный,
Твоих задумчивых ночей
Прозрачный сумрак, блеск безлунный,
Когда я в комнате моей
Пишу, читаю без лампады,
И ясны спящие громады
Пустынных улиц, и светла
Адмиралтейская игла[...]

Красуйся, град Петров, и стой
Неколебимо как Россия,
Да умирится же с тобой
И побежденная стихия;
Вражду и плен старинный свой
Пусть волны финские забудут
И тщетной злобою не будут
Тревожить вечный сон Петра!

== Mid-20th-century changes ==
While there have not been any significant changes since the 1918 decree, debates and fluctuations have to some degree continued.

In December 1942, the use of letter Ё was made mandatory by Decree No. 1825 of the People's Commissariat of Education. Since then, Ё has been taught in schools as the seventh letter of the Russian alphabet (before 1942, it was usually considered a modification of Е and not a separate letter). However, the consistent use of Ё did not consolidate its grip in general publication; the usual typographic practice reverted to selective use of Ё (to show pronunciation of rare words and to distinguish words that are otherwise homographs). By 1952, regulations on checking schoolchildren's works, the Great Soviet Encyclopedia, and the reference book for typographers by K. I. Bylinsky had declared the letter Ё to be optional. Doubts on placing Ё in old literature (see the example above) were cited as one of reasons for the optional status of Ё.

A codification of the rules of Russian orthography and punctuation and the Spelling Dictionary of the Russian Language were published in 1956 but only a few minor orthographic changes were introduced at that time. Those editions resolved a number of variant spellings that existed in dictionaries and in use by typographers and the best writers at that time. The 1956 codification additionally included a clarification of new rules for punctuation developed during the 1930s, and which had not been mentioned in the 1918 decree.

A notable instance of renewed debate followed A. I. Efimov's 1962 publication of an article in Izvestia. The article proposed an extensive reform to move closer to a phonetic representation of the language. Following the renewed discussion in papers and journals, a new Orthographic Commission began work in 1962, under the Russian Language Institute of the Academy of Sciences of the USSR. The Commission published its report, Предложения по усовершенствованию русской орфографии (Proposals for the Improvement of Russian Orthography), in 1964. The publication resulted in widespread debate in newspapers, journals, and on radio and television, as well as over 10,000 letters, all of which were passed to the institute.

Responses to the article pointed to the need to simplify Russian spelling due to the use of Russian as the language of international communication in the Soviet Union and an increased study of Russian in the Eastern Bloc as well as in the West. That instruction for non-native speakers of Russian was one of the central concerns of further reform is indicated in the resistance to Efimov's proposal to drop the terminal "ь" (soft sign) from feminine nouns, as it helps learners identify gender category. Additionally, Efimov claimed that a disproportionate amount of primary school class time was devoted to orthography, rather than phonetics and morphology. Efimov asserted that the existing orthography was essentially unchanged since Grot's codification, and that only by bringing orthography closer to phonetic realization, and eliminating exceptions and variants, could appropriate attention be paid to stylistics and the "development of speech culture". The state's focus on proper instruction in Russian, as the national language of ethnic Russians, as the state language, and as the language of international communication continues to the present day. Eventually, the 1964 project remained a dead proposal.

== Encoding ==
The following IETF language tags have been registered:

- ru-petr1708 for text from the Peter reforms of 1708 until the 1917–18 reforms.
- ru-luna1918 for text following the 1917–18 reforms.

== See also ==
- Yoficator
