= Russian phonology =

Sounds and pronunciation of the Russian language

This article discusses the phonological system of standard Russian based on the Moscow dialect (unless otherwise noted). For an overview of dialects in the Russian language, see Russian dialects. Most descriptions of Russian describe it as having five vowel phonemes, though there is some dispute over whether a sixth vowel, /ɨ/, is separate from /i/. Russian has 34 consonants, which can be divided into two types:

- hard (твёрдый [ˈtvʲordɨj]) or plain
- soft (мягкий [ˈmʲæxʲkʲɪj]) or palatalized

Russian also distinguishes hard consonants from soft consonants and from consonant+/j/ clusters, making four sets in total: /C Cʲ Cj Cʲj/, although /Cj/ in native words appears only at morpheme boundaries (подъезд, pod-yezd, [pɐdˈjest] for example). Russian also preserves palatalized consonants that are followed by another consonant more often than other Slavic languages do. Like Polish, it has both hard postalveolars (/ʂ ʐ/) and soft ones (/tɕ ɕː/ and marginally or dialectally /ʑː/).

Russian has vowel reduction in unstressed syllables. This feature also occurs in a minority of other Slavic languages like Belarusian and Bulgarian and is also found in English, but not in most other Slavic languages, such as Czech, Polish, most varieties of Serbo-Croatian, and Ukrainian.

== Vowels ==
Vowel phonemes
	Front	Central	Back
Close	i	(ɨ)	u
Mid	e		o
Open		a	

Russian vowel chart by Jones & Trofimov (1923:55). The symbol ⟨i̝⟩ stands for a positional variant of /i/ raised in comparison with the usual allophone of /i/, not a raised cardinal [i] which would result in a consonant.

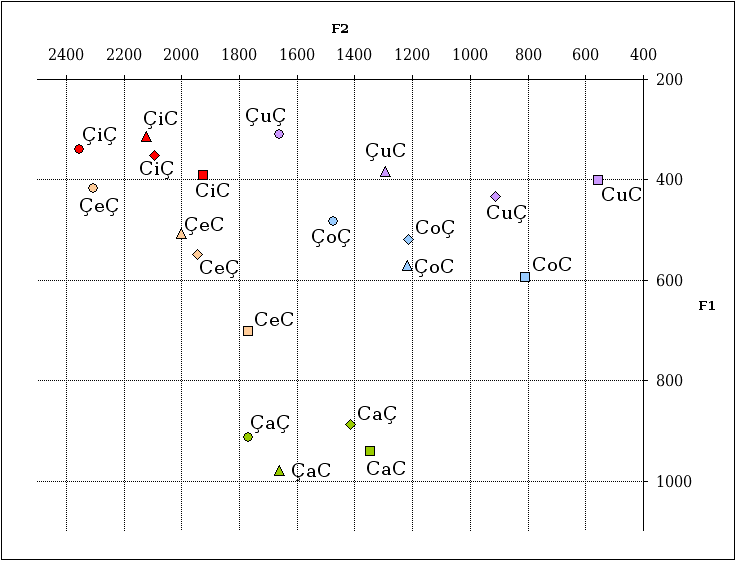
Russian stressed vowel chart according to their formants and surrounding consonants, from Timberlake (2004:31, 38). C is hard (non-palatalized) consonant, Ç is soft (palatalized) consonant. This chart uses frequencies to represent the basic vowel triangle of the Russian language.

Russian has five to six vowels in stressed syllables, /i, u, e, o, a/ and in some analyses /ɨ/, but in most cases these vowels have merged to only two to four vowels when unstressed: /i, u, a/ (or /ɨ, u, a/) after hard consonants and /i, u/ after soft ones.

A long-standing dispute among linguists is whether Russian has five vowel phonemes or six; that is, scholars disagree as to whether [ɨ] constitutes an allophone of /i/ or if there is an independent phoneme /ɨ/. The five-vowel analysis, taken up by the Moscow school, rests on the complementary distribution of [ɨ] and [i], with the former occurring after hard (non-palatalized) consonants (e.g. жить [ʐɨtʲ] 'to live', шип [ʂɨp] 'thorn, spine', цирк [t͡sɨrk] 'circus', etc.) and [i] after soft (palatalized) consonants (e.g. щит [ɕːit] 'shield', чин [t͡ɕin] 'rank', etc.), at the word beginnings, and after vowels. The allophony of the stressed variant of the open /a/ is largely the same, yet no scholar considers [ä] and [æ] to be separate phonemes (which they are in e.g. Slovak).

The five-vowel point of view is further supported by the following facts:

- Some endings have [i] after soft consonants and [ɨ] after hard consonants, e. g. воды́ [vɐˈdɨ] (gen. sg. of вода́ [vɐˈda] 'water'), земли́ [zʲɪˈmlʲi] (gen. sg. of земля́ [zʲɪˈmlʲa] 'ground, land, earth'). Proto-Slavic *y could correspond to either *ę̇ or *i after palatals (see Proto-Slavic language); in Russian, the soft-stem counterpart of the hard-stem ending [ɨ] regularized to [i].
- When a word or morpheme (root or prefix) beginning with /i/ is preceded by a hard consonant, /i/ becomes [ɨ]: и́мя [ˈimʲə] 'name' — без и́мени [bʲɪz ˈɨmʲɪnʲɪ] 'without name' and безымя́нный [bʲɪzɨˈmʲanːɨj] 'nameless', история [ɪˈstorʲɪjə] 'history' — предыстория [prʲɪdɨˈstorʲɪjə] 'events preceding, events leading up, backstory, prehistory', исла́м [ɪsˈɫam] 'Islam' — панислами́зм [ˌpanɨsɫʌˈmʲizm], 'Pan-Islamism', изме́на [ɪˈzmʲenə] 'treason' — госизме́на [ˌɡosɨˈzmʲenə] 'high treason'. According to the current spelling rules standardized in 1956, the letter ⟨ы⟩ is used instead of the morpheme-initial ⟨и⟩ in words with Slavic prefixes (except меж- and сверх-) whereas words with non-Slavic prefixes and compound words conserve the morpheme-initial ⟨и⟩ in the spelling. Pre-1956 spelling varied: whereas for common words such as подымать, взыскать, сыскной, розыгрыш the spelling with ⟨ы⟩ was well established long ago, less common words such as предыдущий [prʲɪdɨˈduɕːɪj] 'previous' were often spelled with ⟨ъи⟩ in the 19th century; however, Yakov Grot prescribed spelling them with ⟨ы⟩. For even less common words, spelling practice varied between ⟨ы⟩, ⟨ъи⟩, and ⟨и⟩ even in the first half of the 20th century.

The six-vowel view, held by the Saint-Petersburg (Leningrad) phonology school, points to several phenomena to make its case:

- Native Russian speakers' ability to articulate [ɨ] in isolation: for example, in the names of the letters ⟨и⟩ and ⟨ы⟩.
- Rare instances of word-initial [ɨ], including the minimal pair и́кать 'to produce the sound и' and ы́кать 'to produce the sound ы', as well as borrowed names and toponyms, like Ыб [ɨp], the name of a river and several villages in the Komi Republic.
- Morphological alternations between non-palatalized consonants without any following vowel or before ы and palatalized consonants before и, like гото́в [ɡʌˈtof] ('ready' adjective, masculine, short-form), гото́вый [ɡʌˈtovɨj] ('ready' adjective, masculine), and гото́вить [ɡʌˈtovʲɪtʲ] ('to get ready; to prepare' verb, transitive), signifying that и palatalizes an inherently non-palatalized underlying consonant while ы does not.

The different behaviour of the underlying combination "hard consonant+/i/" in prefix-root and root-suffix bounds can be explained historically. In Old East Slavic, words such as подъимати (from подъ 'under' + имати 'to take') had the extra-short vowel ъ before и; the combination ъи /ŭi/ changed to [ɨ], which is reflected in the modern Russian spelling подыма́ть [pədɨˈmatʲ] 'to lift' (although contemporary Russian prefers the form поднима́ть [pədnʲɪˈmatʲ] with the epenthetic [nʲ] from снима́ть [sʲnʲɪˈmatʲ] 'to take off', from Old East Slavic сън 'off' + имати 'to take' but reanalysed as с + нима́ть). The Old East Slavic prefixes ending in з (без-, въз-, etc.) did not have the final ъ, but in Modern Russian /i/ after them becomes [ɨ] by analogy, except the verb взима́ть [vzʲɪˈmatʲ] 'to levy, to take monies'.

However, the alternations between hard and soft consonants occur not only when the soft consonant occurs before /i/ or /e/, but also sometimes when the soft consonant occurs before /a/ or /o/ or without any following vowel (which is historically explained by origin of those vowels and vowel absence in Old East Slavic ѧ, е, and ь), which can lead to minimal pairs such as гото́ва [ɡʌˈtovə] ('ready' adjective, feminine, short-form) — гото́вя [ɡʌˈtovʲə] ('getting ready; preparing', adverbial participle), гото́в [ɡʌˈtof] ('ready' adjective, masculine, short-form) — гото́вь [ɡʌˈtofʲ] ('get ready; prepare', imperative). No matter whether the five-vowel or six-vowel point of view is used, the phonological explanation of those alternations requires either a separate "palatalization phoneme" or palatalization as a phoneme alternation occurring before particular morphemes (including null morphemes). Hence, the difference between гото́вый and гото́вить can be explained using the five-vowel point of view.

The most popular view among linguists (and the one taken up in this article) is that of the Moscow school, though Russian pedagogy has typically taught that there are six vowels (the term phoneme is not used).

Reconstructions of Proto-Slavic show that *i and *y (which correspond to [i] and [ɨ]) were separate phonemes. On the other hand, after the first palatalization, Old East Slavic *i and *y contrasted only after alveolars and labials: after palatals only *i occurred, and after velars only *y occurred. With the development of phonemic palatalized alveolars and labials, *i and *y no longer contrasted in any environment and were reinterpreted as allophones of each other, becoming a single phoneme /i/. Even so, this reinterpretation entailed no mergers and no change in the pronunciation. Subsequently, sometime between the twelfth and fourteenth centuries, the allophone of /i/ occurring after a velar consonant changed from [ɨ] to [i] with subsequent palatalization of the velar, turning old Russian хытрыи [ˈxɨtrɨj] into modern хитрый [ˈxʲitrɨj] and old гыбкыи [ˈɡɨpkɨj] into modern гибкий [ˈɡʲipkʲij].

=== Allophony ===
A quick index of vowel pronunciation
Phoneme	Letter (typically)	Phonemic position	Stressed	Reduced
/i/	ы, и*	Ci	[ɨ]	[ɨ̞]
/i/	и	(Cʲ)i	[i]	[ɪ]
/e/	э, е†	(C)e(C)	[ɛ]	[ɨ̞]
/e/	э, е†	(C)eCʲ	[e]	[ɨ̞]
/e/	е	Cʲe	[e]	[ɪ]
/a/	а	(C)a	[a]	[ʌ], [ə]
/a/	я	Cʲa(C)	[a]	[ɪ], [ə]
/a/	я	CʲaCʲ	[æ]	[ɪ]
/o/	о**	(C)o	[o]	[ʌ], [ə]
/o/	ё, е‡	Cʲo	[ɵ]	[ɪ]
/u/	у	(C)u	[u]	[ʊ]
/u/	ю	Cʲu(C)	[u]	[ʊ]
/u/	ю	CʲuCʲ	[ʉ]	[ʉ̞]
"C" represents a hard consonant only. "(C)" represents a hard consonant, a vowel, or an utterance boundary. "Cʲ" represents a soft consonant. * ⟨и⟩ is used after unpaired hard consonants (⟨ж⟩, ⟨ш⟩, and ⟨ц⟩, although some words are spelled with ⟨цы⟩) and on the root onset after a consonant-ending loaned (usually Latin or Greek) prefix (e.g. суперигра [ˌsupʲɪrɨˈɡra]). † ⟨е⟩ is used after unpaired hard consonants (⟨ж⟩, ⟨ш⟩, and ⟨ц⟩) and after paired hard consonants in many loanwords; ⟨э⟩ is mostly used word-initially and after vowels. ** Sometimes spelled ⟨ё⟩ after ⟨ж⟩ and ⟨ш⟩. Reduced /o/ after ⟨ж⟩ and ⟨ш⟩ is written as ⟨е⟩ (except in loanwords) and is mostly pronounced the same as reduced /e/. ‡ Reduced ⟨ё⟩ is written as ⟨е⟩, except in loanwords.

Russian vowels are subject to considerable allophony, subject to both stress and the palatalization of neighboring consonants. In most unstressed positions, in fact, only three phonemes are distinguished after hard consonants, and only two after soft consonants. Unstressed /o/ and /a/ have merged to /a/ (a phenomenon known as Russian: а́канье, romanized: ákan'je); unstressed /i/ and /e/ have merged to /i/ (Russian: и́канье, romanized: íkan'je); and all four unstressed vowels have merged after soft consonants, except in the absolute final position in a word. None of these mergers are represented in writing.

==== Front vowels ====
When a preceding consonant is hard, /i/ is retracted to [ɨ]. Formant studies in Padgett (2001) demonstrate that [ɨ] is better characterized as slightly diphthongized from the velarization of the preceding consonant, (Note: Thus, /ɨ/ is pronounced something like [ˠi]) implying that a phonological pattern of using velarization to enhance perceptual distinctiveness between hard and soft consonants is strongest before /i/. When unstressed, /i/ becomes near-close; that is, [ɨ̞] following a hard consonant and [ɪ] in most other environments. Between soft consonants, stressed /i/ is raised, as in пить [pʲi̝tʲ] ('to drink'). When preceded and followed by coronal or dorsal consonants, [ɨ] is fronted to [ɨ̟]. After a cluster of a labial and /ɫ/, [ɨ] is retracted, as in плыть [pɫɨ̠tʲ] ('to float'); it is also slightly diphthongized to [ɯ̟ɨ̟].

In native words, /e/ only follows unpaired (i.e. the retroflexes and /ts/) and soft consonants. After soft consonants (but not before), it is a mid vowel [ɛ̝] (hereafter represented without the diacritic, for simplicity), while a following soft consonant raises it to close-mid [e]. Another allophone, an open-mid [ɛ], occurs word-initially and between hard consonants. Preceding hard consonants retract /e/ to [ɛ̠] and [e̠] so that жест ('gesture') and цель ('target') are pronounced [ʐɛ̠st] and [tse̠lʲ] respectively.

In words borrowed from other languages, /e/ often follows hard consonants; this foreign pronunciation usually persists in Russian for many years until the word is more fully adopted into Russian. For instance, шофёр (from French chauffeur) was pronounced [ʂoˈfɛr] in the early twentieth century, but is now pronounced [ʂʌˈfʲɵr]. On the other hand, the pronunciations of words such as отель [ʌˈtelʲ] ('hotel') retain the hard consonants despite a long presence in the language.

==== Back vowels ====
Between soft consonants, /a/ becomes [æ], as in пять [pʲætʲ] ('five'). When not following a soft consonant, /a/ is retracted to [ɑ̟] before /ɫ/ as in палка [ˈpɑ̟ɫkə] ('stick').

For most speakers, /o/ is a mid vowel [o̞], but it can be a more open [ɔ] for some speakers. Following a soft consonant, /o/ is centralized and raised to [ɵ] as in тётя [ˈtʲɵtʲə] ('aunt'). More recently (2015) /o/ has been described as "a diphthongoid, with a closer lip rounding at the beginning of the vowel that gets progressively weaker [^{ʊ}o] or even [^{ʊ}ɔ^{ʌ}], particularly when occurring word-initially or word-finally under the stress". This phenomenon does not seem to be a recent development because the diphthongal nature of /o/ under stress has already been described in 1969.

As with the other back vowels, /u/ is centralized to [ʉ] between soft consonants, as in чуть [tɕʉtʲ] ('barely, slightly'). When unstressed, /u/ becomes near-close; central [ʉ̞] between soft consonants, centralized back [ʊ] in other positions.

==== Unstressed vowels ====
Russian unstressed vowels have lower intensity and lower energy. They are typically shorter than stressed vowels, and /a e o i/ in most unstressed positions tend to undergo mergers for most dialects:

- /o/ has merged with /a/: for instance, вал 'bulwark' is pronounced /vaɫ/ (phonetically [vaɫ]) and вол 'ox' is pronounced /voɫ/ (phonetically [voɫ]) but валы́ 'bulwarks' and волы́ 'oxen' are both pronounced /vaˈɫi/ (phonetically [vʌˈɫɨ]).
- /e/ has merged with /i/: for instance, лиса́ (lisá) 'vixen' and леса́ 'fishing line' are both pronounced /lʲiˈsa/ (phonetically [lʲɪˈsa]); however, ли́сы (lísy) 'vixens' is pronounced /ˈlʲisɨ/ (phonetically [ˈlʲisɨ]) while ле́сы (lésy) 'fishing-lines' is pronounced /ˈlʲesɨ/ (phonetically [ˈlʲesɨ]).
- /a/ and /o/ have merged with /i/ after soft consonants: for instances,
  - я́дра 'seeds, kernels, cores, nuclei, etc.' is pronounced /ˈjadra/ (phonetically [ˈjadrə]) but ядро́ 'seed, kernel, core, nucleus, etc.' is pronounced /jiˈdro/ (phonetically [jɪˈdro]);
  - ёж 'hedgehog' is pronounced /ˈjoʐ/ (phonetically [jɵʂ]) but ежи́ 'hedgehogs' is pronounced /jiˈʐi/ (phonetically [jɪˈʐɨ]) (/jo/ is written as ⟨e⟩ /je/ in these positions).

The merger of unstressed /e/ and /i/ in particular is less universal in the pretonic (pre-accented) position than that of unstressed /o/ and /a/. For example, speakers of some rural dialects as well as the "Old Petersburgian" pronunciation may have the latter but not the former merger, distinguishing between лиса́ [lʲɪˈsa] and леса́ [lʲɘˈsa], but not between валы́ and волы́ (both [vʌˈɫɨ]). The distinction in some loanwords between unstressed /e/ and /i/, or /o/ and /a/ is codified in some pronunciation dictionaries (Avanesov (1985:663), Zarva (1993:15)), for example, фо́рте [ˈfortɛ] and ве́то [ˈvʲeto].

Unstressed vowels (except /o/) are preserved word-finally, for example in second-person plural or formal verb forms with the ending -те, such as де́лаете ("you do") /ˈdʲeɫajitʲe/ (phonetically [ˈdʲeɫə(j)ɪtʲe]). The same applies for vowels starting a word.

As a result, in most unstressed positions, only three vowel phonemes are distinguished after hard consonants (/u/, /a ~ o/, and /e ~ i/), and only two after soft consonants (/u/ and /a ~ o ~ e ~ i/). For the most part, Russian orthography (as opposed to that of the closely related Belarusian) does not reflect vowel reduction. This can be seen in, for examples:

- Russian село́ [sʲɪˈɫo] "village" and сёлa [ˈsʲɵɫə] "villages" — cf. Belarusian сяло́ [sʲaˈɫo] and сёлы [ˈsʲoɫɨ]. Russian unstressed ё |ʲo| (which is reduced to [ʲɪ]) is written as if it were /ʲe/, ⟨e⟩, while Belarusian unstressed ё |ʲo| (which is reduced to [ʲa]) is transparently written as ⟨я⟩.
- Russian кот [kot] "tomcat" and коты́ [kɐˈtɨ] "tomcats" — cf. Belarusian кот [kot] and каты́ [kaˈtɨ]. Russian unstressed morphophonemic |o| (which is reduced to [ɐ]) is written as if it were still /o/, ⟨о⟩, while Belarusian unstressed morphophonemic |o| (which is reduced to a [a]) is transparently written as ⟨а⟩.
  - There exist some exceptional Russian words whose original ⟨o⟩ (from ancestral *o) was and is never stressed across the words' entire inflectional paradigms and thus pronounced [ɐ] or [ə] (depending on its position), and then is rewritten as ⟨a⟩ (as if it were morphophonemic |a|); for instances:
    - паро́м [pɐˈrom] ('ferry'), which is from Proto-Slavic *pormъ;
    - карава́й [kərɐˈvaj] ('korovai'), which is from PSl. *korvajь etc.
  - Spelling those words with ⟨а⟩ was already common in the 18th century, but it co-existed with the spelling with ⟨о⟩ (пором, коровай), conforming to etymology of those words. Dictionaries often gave both spellings. Finally the spelling of those words with ⟨а⟩ was set by the 1956 orthographic codification (orthographic rules and spelling dictionary), based on the spread of usage.

===== Vowel mergers =====
In terms of actual pronunciation, there are at least two different levels of vowel reduction: vowels are less reduced when a syllable immediately precedes the stressed one, and more reduced in other positions. This is particularly visible in the realization of unstressed /o/ and /a/, where a less-reduced allophone [ʌ] appears alongside a more-reduced allophone [ə].

The pronunciation of unstressed /o ~ a/ is as follows:

1. [ʌ] (sometimes transcribed as [ɐ]; the latter is phonetically correct for the standard Moscow pronunciation, whereas the former is phonetically correct for the standard Saint Petersburg pronunciation; this article uses only the symbol [ʌ]) appears in the following positions:
  - In the syllable immediately before the stress, when a hard consonant precedes: e.g. наро́д [nʌˈrot] ('people, nation'), моро́з [mʌˈros] ('frost'), дрова́ [drʌˈva] ('firewood'), and трава́ [trʌˈva] ('grass').
  - In absolute word-initial position: e.g. аванга́рд [ʌvʌnˈɡart] ('vanguard'), огоро́д [ʌgʌˈrot] ('kitchen garden').
  - In hiatus, when the vowel occurs twice without a consonant between; this is written ⟨aa⟩, ⟨ao⟩, ⟨oa⟩, or ⟨oo⟩: сообража́ть [sʌʌbrʌˈʐatʲ] ('to use common sense, to reason').
2. [ə] appears elsewhere, when a hard consonant precedes: о́блако [ˈobɫəkə] ('cloud'), я́года [ˈjaɡədə] ('berry').
  - In absolute word-final position, [ʌ] may occur instead, especially at the end of a syntagma.
3. When a soft consonant or /j/ precedes, both /o/ and /a/ merge with /i/ and are pronounced as [ɪ]. Example: язы́к [jɪˈzɨk] ('tongue'), ежи́ [jɪˈʐɨ] ('hedgehogs') (/o/ is written as ⟨e⟩ in these positions; compare ёж [ˈjoʂ] 'hedgehog').
  - This merger also tends to occur after formerly soft consonants now pronounced hard (/ʐ/, /ʂ/, /ts/), where the pronunciation [ɨ̞] occurs; e.g. шевели́ть [ʂɨvʲɪˈlʲitʲ] 'to stir ~ to move ~ to bulge'. This always occurs when the spelling uses the soft vowel variants, e.g. жена́ [ʐɨ̞ˈna] ('wife') vs. жёны [ˈʐonɨ] ('wives') (but шок [ˈʂok] 'shock (n.)' vs. шоки́ровать [ʂɐˈkʲirəvətʲ] 'to shock (v.)'; unstressed spellings ⟨жо⟩, ⟨шо⟩ are used only in loanwords). However, [ɨ̞] also occurs in a few word roots where the spelling writes a hard /a/. Examples:
    - жаль [ʐalʲ] 'regret', whence жале́ть [ʐɨ̞ˈlʲetʲ] ('to regret'), к сожале́нию [ksəʐɨ̞ˈlʲenʲɪju] ('unfortunately').
    - ло́шадь [ˈɫoʂətʲ] ~ [ˈɫoʂɨtʲ] ('horse [sg. nom. & acc.]'), whence лошаде́й, [ɫəʂɨ̞ˈdʲej] ('horses' [pl. gen. & acc.]').
    - -дцать- in numbers: e.g. двадцати́ [dvətsɨ̞ˈtʲi] ('twenty [gen., dat., prep.]'), тридцатью́ [trʲɪtsɨˈtʲju] ('thirty [instr.]').
    - ржано́й [rʐɨ̞ˈnoj] ~ [rʐɐˈnoj] ('rye [adj. m. nom.]').
    - жасми́н [ʐɨ̞ˈsmʲin] ~ [ʐɐˈsmʲin] ('jasmine [n. sg. nom. & acc.]').
  - After those now-hardened formerly-soft consonants (/ʐ/, /ʂ/, /ts/) and in word-final position, unstressed /a/ and unstressed /o/ (the latter written as ⟨e⟩) merge and are pronounced [ə], as in:
    - пыльца́ [pɨlʲˈt͡sa] ('pollen') vs. уби́йца [ʊˈbʲijt͡sə] ('murderer, assassin'),
    - строжа́йше [ˈstrɐˈʐajʂə] ('most strictly', adv.) vs. хорошо́ [xərɐˈʂo] ('good', neut. predic. or 'well', adv.),
    - похо́же [pɐˈxoʐə] ('similar(ly)', neut. predic. or adv.), vs. свежо́ [svʲɪˈʐo] ('fresh(ly)', neut. predic. or adv.), and
    - де́ревце [ˈdʲerʲɪft͡sə] ('sapling, small tree') vs. its synonym деревцо́ [dʲɪrʲɪfˈt͡so].
    - Yet word-final unstressed /o/ after /ʐ/, /ʂ/, and /t͡s/ is also pronounced [ɨ] by some speakers: e.g. строжа́йше [ˈstrɐˈʐajʂɨ] похо́же [pɐˈxoʐɨ], корытце [kərʲɪt͡sːɨ] "trough, washing tub (diminutive) (nom. sg.)" (as it rhymes with води́цы [vɐˈdʲit͡sɨ] "water (dim.) (gen. sg.)" in the song Цыплята "the little chickens").
4. These processes occur even across word boundaries as in под морем [pʌd‿ˈmorʲɪm] ('under the sea').

The pronunciation of unstressed /e ~ i/ is [ɪ] after soft consonants and /j/, and word-initially (эта́п [ɪˈtap] ('stage'); икра́ [ɪˈkra] ('roe'); исто́рия [ɪˈstorʲɪjə]; диви́ть [dʲɪˈvʲitʲ] ('to surprise'), etc.), but [ɨ̞] after hard consonants (дыша́ть [dɨ̞ˈʂatʲ] ('to breathe'); предыстория [prʲɪdɨˈstorʲɪjə] (pre-1918 spelling: предъисторія)).

There are a number of exceptions to the above vowel-reduction rules:

- Vowels may not merge in foreign borrowings, particularly with unusual or recently borrowed words such as ра́дио, [ˈradʲɪo] 'radio'. In such words, unstressed /a/ may be pronounced as [ʌ], regardless of context; unstressed /e/ does not merge with /i/ in initial position or after vowels, so word pairs like эмигра́нт and иммигра́нт, or эмити́ровать and имити́ровать, differ in pronunciation.
- Across certain word-final inflections, the reductions do not completely apply. For example, after soft or unpaired consonants, unstressed /a/, /e/ and /i/ of a final syllable may be distinguished from each other. For example, жи́тели [ˈʐɨtʲɪlʲɪ] ('residents') contrasts with both (о) жи́теле [(ʌ) ˈʐɨtʲɪlʲɪ̞] ('[about] a resident') and жи́теля [ˈʐɨtʲɪlʲə] ('(of) a resident'). Also, хо́дит [ˈxodʲɪt] ('he goes') and хо́дят [ˈxodʲət] ('they go').
- If the vowel ⟨o⟩ belongs to the conjunctions но ('but') or то ('then'), it is not reduced, even when unstressed.

===== Other changes =====
Unstressed /u/ is generally pronounced as a lax (or near-close) [ʊ], e.g. мужчи́на [mʊˈɕːinə] ('man'). Between soft consonants, it becomes centralized to [ʉ̞], as in юти́ться [jʉ̞ˈtʲitsə] ('to huddle').

Note a spelling irregularity in /s/ of the reflexive suffix -ся: with a preceding -т- in third-person present and a -ть- in infinitive, it is pronounced as [tsə], i.e. hard instead of with its soft counterpart, since [ts], normally spelled with ⟨ц⟩, is traditionally always hard. In other forms both pronunciations [sə] and [sʲə] (or [s] and [sʲ] after vowels, spelled -сь) alternate for a speaker with some usual form-dependent preferences: in the outdated dialects, reflexive imperative verbs (such as бо́йся, lit. "be afraid yourself") may be pronounced with [sə] instead of modern (and phonetically consistent) [sʲə]. In adverbial participles ending on -я́сь or -а́сь (with a stressed suffix), books on Russian standard pronunciation prescribe [sʲ] as the only correct variant.

In weakly stressed positions, vowels may become voiceless between two voiceless consonants: вы́ставка [ˈvɨstə̥fkə] ('exhibition'), потому́ что [pə̥tʌˈmu ʂtə] ('because'). This may also happen in cases where only the following consonant is voiceless: че́реп [ˈtɕerʲɪ̥p] ('skull').

===== Phonemic analysis =====
Because of mergers of different phonemes in unstressed position, the assignment of a particular phone to a phoneme requires phonological analysis. There have been different approaches to this problem:

- The Saint Petersburg phonology school assigns allophones to particular phonemes. For example, any [ʌ] is considered as a realization of /a/.
- The Moscow phonology school uses an analysis with morphophonemes (морфоне́мы, singular морфоне́ма). It treats a given unstressed allophone as belonging to a particular morphophoneme depending on morphological alternations. For example, [ʌ] is analyzed as either |a| or |o|. To make a determination, one must seek out instances where an unstressed morpheme containing [ʌ] in one word is stressed in another word. Thus, because the word валы́ [vʌˈɫɨ] ('shafts') shows an alternation with вал [vaɫ] ('shaft'), this instance of [ʌ] belongs to the morphophoneme |a|. Meanwhile, волы́ [vʌˈɫɨ] ('oxen') alternates with вол [voɫ] ('ox'), showing that this instance of [ʌ] belongs to the morphophoneme |o|. If there are no alternations between stressed and unstressed syllables for a particular morpheme, then no assignment is made, and existence of an archiphoneme is postulated. For example, the word соба́ка [sʌˈbakə] ('dog') is analysed as |s(a/o)ˈbaka|, where |(a/o)| is an archiphoneme.
- Some linguists prefer to avoid making the decision. Their terminology includes strong vowel phonemes (the five) for stressed vowels plus several weak phonemes for unstressed vowels: thus, [ɪ] represents the weak phoneme /ɪ/, which contrasts with other weak phonemes, but not with strong ones.

=== Diphthongs ===
Russian diphthongs all end in a non-syllabic [i̯], an allophone of /j/ and the only semivowel in Russian. In all contexts other than after a vowel, /j/ is considered an approximant consonant. Phonological descriptions of /j/ may also classify it as a consonant even in the coda. In such descriptions, Russian has no diphthongs.

The first part of diphthongs is subject to the same allophony as their constituent vowels. Examples of words with diphthongs: яйцо́ [jɪjˈtso] ('egg'), ей [jej] ('her' dat.), де́йственный [ˈdʲejstvʲɪnnɨj] ('effective'). /ij/, written ⟨-ий⟩ or ⟨-ый⟩, is a common inflexional affix of adjectives, participles, and nouns, where it is often unstressed; at normal conversational speed, such unstressed endings may be monophthongized to [ɪ̟]. When stressed, this affix is spelled ⟨-ой⟩ and pronounced /oj/. Unstressed ⟨-ый⟩ may be pronounced [əj] (as if spelled ⟨-ой⟩) in free variation with [ɨj]. In adjectives ending in ⟨-кий, -гий, -хий⟩, traditional Moscow norm prescribed the pronunciation [kəj, ɡəj, xəj] (as if spelled ⟨-кой, -гой, -хой⟩), but now those adjectives are usually pronounced according to the spelling, thus [kʲɪj, ɡʲɪj, xʲɪj]. The same can be said about verbs ending in ⟨-кивать, -гивать, -хивать⟩.

== Consonants ==
⟨ʲ⟩ denotes palatalization, meaning the center of the tongue is raised toward the palate during and somewhat after the articulation of the consonant. Phonemes whose phonemic status has been disputed are enclosed in parentheses.

Consonant phonemes
		Labial		Dental, Alveolar		Post- alveolar	Palatal	Velar	
		hard	soft	hard	soft	hard	soft	hard	soft
Nasal		m	mʲ	n	nʲ				
Stop	voiceless	p	pʲ	t	tʲ			k	kʲ
Stop	voiced	b	bʲ	d	dʲ			ɡ	ɡʲ
Affricate				t͡s	(t͡sʲ)		t͡ɕ		
Fricative	voiceless	f	fʲ	s	sʲ	ʂ	ɕː	x	xʲ
Fricative	voiced	v	vʲ	z	zʲ	ʐ	(ʑː)	(ɣ)	(ɣʲ)
Approximant				ɫ	lʲ		j		
Trill					rʲ	r			

Notes

- Most consonant phonemes come in hard–soft pairs, except for always-hard /ts, ʂ, ʐ/ and always-soft /tɕ, ɕː, j/ and formerly or marginally /ʑː/. There is a marked tendency of Russian hard consonants to be velarized, uvularized, or pharyngealized, though this is a subject of some academic dispute. Velarization is clearest before the front vowels /e/ and /i/, and with labial and velar consonants as well as the lateral. As with palatalization, it results in vowel colouring and diphthongisation when stressed, in particular with /i/, realized approximately as [ɯi̯] or [ɤ̯ɪ]. Its function is to make the contrast between hard and soft consonants perceptually more salient, and the less salient the contrast is otherwise (such as labial consonants being cross-linguistically the most resistant to palatalization), the higher the velarization degree.
  - /ʐ/ and /ʂ/ are always hard in native words (even if spelling contains a "softening" letter after them, as in жена, шёлк, жить, and мышь). A few loanwords are spelled with ⟨жю⟩ or ⟨шю⟩; authoritative pronunciation dictionaries prescribe hard pronunciation for some of them (e.g. брошюра, парашют, амбушюр, шюцкор) but soft for other ones (e.g. пшют, фишю); жюри may be pronounced either way. The letter combinations ⟨жю⟩, ⟨жя⟩, ⟨жё⟩, ⟨шю⟩, ⟨шя⟩, and ⟨шё⟩ also occur in foreign proper names, mostly of French or Lithuanian origin. Notable examples include Гёльджюк (Gölcük), Жён Африк (Jeune Afrique), Жюль Верн (Jules Verne), Герхард Шюрер (Gerhard Schürer), Шяуляй (Šiauliai), and Шяшувис (Šešuvis). The dictionary of Ageenko & Zarva (1993) prescribes soft pronunciation in these names. However, since the cases of soft ⟨ж⟩ and ⟨ш⟩ are marginal and not universally pronounced as such, ⟨ж⟩ and ⟨ш⟩ are generally considered always-hard consonants, and the long phonemes /ʑː/ and /ɕː/ are not considered their soft counterparts, as they do not pattern in the same ways that other hard–soft pairs do.
  - /ts/ is generally listed among the always-hard consonants; however, certain foreign proper names, including those of Ukrainian, Polish, Lithuanian, or German origin (e.g. Цюрупа, Пацюк, Цявловский, Цюрих), as well as loanwords (e.g., хуацяо, from Chinese), contain a soft [tsʲ]. The phonemicity of a soft /tsʲ/ is supported by neologisms that come from native word-building processes (e.g. фрицёнок, шпицята). However, according to Yanushevskaya & Bunčić (2015), /ts/ really is always hard, and realizing it as palatalized [tsʲ] is considered "emphatically non-standard", and occurs only in some regional accents.
  - /tɕ/ and /j/ are always soft.
  - /ɕː/ is also always soft. A formerly common pronunciation of /ɕ/+/tɕ/ indicates the sound may be two underlying phonemes: /ʂ/ and /tɕ/, thus /ɕː/ can be considered as a marginal phoneme. In today's most widespread pronunciation, [ɕtɕ] appears (instead of [ɕː]) for orthographical -зч-/-сч- where ч- starts the root of a word, and -з/-с belongs to a preposition or a "clearly distinguishable" prefix (e.g. без часо́в [bʲɪɕtɕɪˈsof], 'without a clock'; расчерти́ть [rəɕtɕɪrˈtʲitʲ], 'to rule'); in all other cases /ɕː/ is used (щётка [ˈɕːɵtkə], гру́зчик [ˈɡruɕːɪk], перепи́счик [pʲɪrʲɪˈpʲiɕːɪk], сча́стье [ˈɕːæsʲtʲjə], мужчи́на [mʊˈɕːinə], исщипа́ть [ɪɕːɪˈpatʲ], расщепи́ть [rəɕːɪˈpʲitʲ] etc.)
  - The marginally phonemic sound [ʑː] is largely obsolete except in the more conservative standard accent of Moscow, in which it only occurs in a handful of words; insofar as this soft pronunciation is lost, the corresponding hard [ʐː] replaces it: e.g. дро́жжи [ˈdroʑːɪ] ~ [ˈdroʐːɨ]. This sound may derive from an underlying /zʐ/: заезжа́ть [zə(ɪ̯)ɪˈʑːætʲ], modern [zə(ɪ̯)ɪˈʐːatʲ] 'to call in, to drive into'. The underlying /zʐ/ and /sʐ/ in prefix–root bounds are pronounced as [ʐː] (not [ʑː]): разже́чь [rɐˈʐːɛt͡ɕ] 'to kindle', сжечь [ʐːɛt͡ɕ] 'to burn up'. For most speakers, [ʑː] can most commonly be formed by assimilative voicing of [ɕː] (including across words): вещдо́к [vʲɪʑːˈdok]. For more information, see alveolo-palatal consonant and retroflex consonant.
- /ʂ/ and /ʐ/ are somewhat concave apical postalveolar. They may be described as retroflex, e.g. by Hamann (2004), but this is to indicate that they are not laminal nor palatalized; not to say that they are subapical. They also tend to be at least slightly labialized, including when followed by unrounded vowels.
- Hard /t, d, n/ are laminal denti-alveolar [t̪, d̪, n̪]; unlike in many other languages, /n/ does not become velar [ŋ] before velar consonants.
- Hard /ɫ/ has been variously described as pharyngealized apical alveolar [l̺ˤ] and velarized laminal denti-alveolar [l̪ˠ].
- Hard /r/ is postalveolar, typically a trill [r̠].
- Soft /rʲ/ is an apical dental trill [r̪ʲ], usually with only a single contact.
- Soft /tʲ, dʲ, nʲ/ are laminal alveolar [t̻͡s̻ʲ, d̻͡z̻ʲ, n̻ʲ]. As of the twenty-first century /tʲ, dʲ/ are affricated in most contexts. This phenonomenon of affrication is known in Russian as tsekan'ye and dzekan'ye, and it is paralleled in Belarusian.
- Soft /lʲ/ is either laminal alveolar [l̻ʲ] or laminal denti-alveolar [l̪ʲ].
- /ts, s, sʲ, z, zʲ/ are dental [t̪s̪, s̪, s̪ʲ, z̪, z̪ʲ], i.e. dentalized laminal alveolar. They are pronounced with the blade of the tongue very close to the upper front teeth, with the tip of the tongue resting behind the lower front teeth.
- The voiced /v, vʲ/ are often realized with weak friction [v̞, v̞ʲ] or even as approximants [ʋ, ʋʲ], particularly in spontaneous speech.
- A marginal phoneme /ɣ/ occurs instead of /ɡ/ in certain interjections: ага́, ого́, угу́, эге, о-го-го́, э-ге-ге, гоп. (Thus, there exists a minimal pair of homographs: ага́ [ʌˈɣa] 'aha!' vs ага́ [ʌˈɡa] 'agha'). The same sound [ɣ] can be found in бухга́лтер (spelled ⟨хг⟩, though in цейхга́уз 'arsenal', ⟨хг⟩ is [x]), optionally in га́битус 'habitus' and in a few other loanwords. Also optionally (and less frequently than a century ago) [ɣ] can be used instead of [ɡ] in certain religious words (a phenomenon influenced by Church Slavonic pronunciation): Бо́га [ˈboɣə], Бо́гу [ˈboɣʊ]... (declension forms of Бог [ˈbox] 'God'), Госпо́дь [ɣʌˈspotʲ] 'Lord' (especially in the exclamation Го́споди! [ˈɣospədʲɪ] 'Oh Lord!'), благо́й [bɫʌˈɣɵj] 'good'.
- Some linguists (like I. G. Dobrodomov and his school) postulate the existence of a phonemic glottal stop /ʔ/. This marginal phoneme can be found, for example, in the word не́-а [ˈnʲeʔə]. Claimed minimal pairs for this phoneme include су́женный [ˈsʔuʐɨnɨj] 'narrowed' (a participle from су́зить 'to narrow', with prefix с- and root -уз-, cf. у́зкий 'narrow') vs су́женый [ˈsuʐɨnɨj] 'betrothed' (originally a participle from суди́ть 'to judge', now an adjective; the root is суд 'court') and с А́ней [ˈsʔanʲɪj] 'with Ann' vs Са́ней [ˈsanʲɪj] '(by) Alex'.

There is some dispute over the phonemicity of soft velar consonants. Typically, the soft–hard distinction is allophonic for velar consonants: they become soft before front vowels (e. g. стена́ [sʲtʲɪˈna] 'wall', genitive стены́ [sʲtʲɪˈnɨ], but рука́ [rʊˈka] 'hand, arm', genitive руки́ [rʊˈkʲi]) unless there is a word boundary, in which case they are hard (e.g. к Ива́ну [k‿ɨˈvanʊ] 'to Ivan'). Hard variants occur everywhere else. Exceptions are represented mostly by:

- Loanwords:
  - Soft: гёзы, гюрза́, гяу́р, секью́рити, кекс, кяри́з, са́нкхья, хянга́;
  - Hard: кок-сагы́з, гэ́льский, акы́н, кэб (кеб), хэ́ппенинг.
- Proper nouns of foreign origin:
  - Soft: Алигье́ри, Гёте, Гю́нтер, Гянджа́, Джокьяка́рта, Кёнигсберг, Кюраса́о, Кя́хта, Хью́стон, Хёндэ, Хю́бнер, Пюхяя́рви;
  - Hard: Мангышла́к, Гэ́ри, Кызылку́м, Кэмп-Дэ́вид, Архы́з, Хуанхэ́.

The rare native examples are fairly new, as most of them were coined in the last century:

- Soft: forms of the verb ткать 'weave' (ткёшь, ткёт etc., and derivatives like соткёшься); догёнок/догята, герцогёнок/герцогята; and adverbial participles of the type берегя, стерегя, стригя, жгя, пекя, секя, ткя (it is disputed whether these are part of the standard language or just informal colloquialisms);
- Hard: the name гэ of letter ⟨г⟩, acronyms and derived words (кагэбэшник, днепрогэсовский), a few interjections (гы, кыш, хэй), some onomatopoeic words (гыгыкать), and colloquial forms of certain patronyms: Олегыч, Маркыч, Аристархыч (where -ыч is a contraction of standard language's patronymical suffix -ович rather than a continuation of ancient -ич).

In the mid-twentieth century, a small number of reductionist approaches made by structuralists put forth that palatalized consonants occur as the result of phonological processes involving /j/ (or palatalization as a phoneme in itself), so that there were no underlying palatalized consonants. Despite such proposals, linguists have long agreed that the underlying structure of Russian is closer to that of its acoustic properties, namely that soft consonants are separate phonemes in their own right.

== Voicing ==
Consonants and their voiced/voiceless equivalents
Voiced	Voiceless
Б /b/	П /p/
В /v/	Ф /f/
Г /ɡ/	К /k/
Д /d/	Т /t/
Ж /ʐ/	Ш /ʂ/
З /z/	С /s/
Л /l/	–
М /m/	–
Н /n/	–
Р /r/	–
–	Х /x/
–	Ц /ts/
–	Ч /tɕ/
–	Щ /ɕː/
Й /j/	–

=== Final devoicing ===
Voiced consonants (/b/, /bʲ/, /d/, /dʲ/ /ɡ/, /v/, /vʲ/, /z/, /zʲ/, /ʐ/, and /ʑː/) are devoiced word-finally unless the next word begins with a voiced obstruent. In other words, their voiceless equivalent will be used (see table on the right).

Examples:

- рассказ (story, tale) sounds like расскас [rɐˈskas]
- нож (knife) sounds like нош [noʂ]
- Иванов (Ivanov) sounds like Иваноф [ɪvɐˈnof]; and so on.

Г also represents voiceless [x] word-finally in some words, such as бог [ˈbox] ('god'). This is related to the use of the marginal (or dialectal) phoneme /ɣ/ in some religious words.

=== Voicing elsewhere ===
Generally, when a voiced consonant comes before a voiceless one, its sound will shift to its voiceless equivalent (see table).

- Example: Ложка (spoon) sounds like Лошка [ˈɫoʂkə].

That happens because ж is a voiced consonant, and it comes before the voiceless к.

The same logic applies when a voiceless consonant comes before a voiced obstruent (except в). In this case, the sound of the former will change to its voiced equivalent.

- Example: сделать (to do) sounds like зделать [ˈzʲdʲeɫətʲ].

Russian features general regressive assimilation of voicing and palatalization. In longer clusters, this means that multiple consonants may be soft despite their underlyingly (and orthographically) being hard. The process of voicing assimilation applies across word-boundaries when there is no pause between words. Within a morpheme, voicing is not distinctive before obstruents (except for /v/, and /vʲ/ when followed by a vowel or sonorant). The voicing or devoicing is determined by that of the final obstruent in the sequence: просьба [ˈprozʲbə] ('request'), водка [ˈvotkə] ('vodka'). In foreign borrowings, this is not always the case for /f(ʲ)/, as in Адольф Гитлер [ʌˈdolʲf ˈɡʲitlʲɪr] ('Adolf Hitler') and граф болеет ('the count is ill'). /v/ and /vʲ/ are unusual in that they seem transparent to voicing assimilation; in the syllable onset, both voiced and voiceless consonants may appear before /v(ʲ)/:

- тварь [tvarʲ]) ('the creature')
- два [dva] ('two')
- световой [s(ʲ)vʲɪtʌˈvoj] ('of light')
- звезда [z(ʲ)vʲɪˈzda] ('star')

When /v(ʲ)/ precedes and follows obstruents, the voicing of the cluster is governed by that of the final segment (per the rule above) so that voiceless obstruents that precede /v(ʲ)/ are voiced if /v(ʲ)/ is followed by a voiced obstruent (e.g. к вдове [ɡvdʌˈvʲe] 'to the widow') while a voiceless obstruent will devoice all segments (e.g. без впуска [bʲɪs ˈfpuskə] 'without an admission').

/tɕ/, /ts/, and /x/ have voiced allophones ([dʑ], [dz] and [ɣ]) before voiced obstruents, as in дочь бы [ˈdodʑ bɨ] ('a daughter would'), плацдарм [pɫʌdzˈdarm] ('bridge-head') and горох готов [ɡɐˈroɣ ɡɐˈtof] ('peas are ready').

Other than /mʲ/ and /nʲ/, nasals and liquids devoice between voiceless consonants or a voiceless consonant and a pause: контрфорс [ˌkontr̥ˈfors]) ('buttress').

== Palatalization ==
Before /j/, paired consonants (that is, those that come in a hard-soft pair) are normally soft as in пью [pʲju] ('I drink') and бью [bʲju] ('I hit'). However, the last consonant of prefixes and parts of compound words generally remains hard in the standard language: отъезд [ʌˈtjest] ('departure'), Минюст [ˌmʲiˈnjust] ('Min[istry of] Just[ice]'); when the prefix ends in /s/ or /z/ there may be an optional softening: съездить [ˈs(ʲ)jezʲdʲɪtʲ] ('to travel').

Paired consonants preceding /e/ are also soft; although there are exceptions from loanwords, alternations across morpheme boundaries are the norm. The following examples show some of the morphological alternations between a hard consonant and its soft counterpart:

Hard			Soft		
Russian	IPA/Audio	Translation	Russian	IPA/Audio	Translation
дом	[dom]	'house' (nom)	до́ме	[ˈdomʲe]	'house' (prep)
крова́вый	[krʌˈvavɨj]	'bloody'	крова́веть	[krʌˈvavʲɪtʲ]	'to become bloody'
отве́т	[ʌˈtvʲet]	'answer'	отве́тить	[ʌˈtvʲetʲɪtʲ]	'to answer'
(я) несу́	[(jæ) nʲɪˈsu]	'I carry'	(он, она, оно) несёт	[nʲɪˈsʲɵt]	'carries'
жена́	[ʐɨˈna]	'wife'	же́нин	[ˈʐenʲɪn]	'wife's'
коро́ва	[kʌˈrovə]	'cow'	коро́вий	[kʌˈrovʲɪj]	'bovine'
прямо́й	[prʲɪˈmoj]	'straight'	прямизна́	[prʲɪmʲɪˈzna]	'straightness'
вор	[vor]	'thief'	вори́шка	[vʌˈrʲiʂkə]	'little thief (diminutive)'
написа́л	[nəpʲɪˈsaɫ]	'he wrote'	написа́ли	[nəpʲɪˈsalʲɪ]	'they wrote'
горбу́н	[ɡʌrˈbun]	'hunchback'	горбу́нья	[ɡʌrˈbunʲjə]	'female hunchback'
высо́к	[vɨˈsok]	'high'	высь	[vɨsʲ]	'height'

Velar consonants are soft when preceding /i/, and never occur before [ɨ] within a word.

Before hard dental consonants and /r/, labial and dental consonants are hard: орла́ [ʌrˈɫa] ('eagle' gen. sg), cf. орёл [ʌˈrʲoɫ] ('eagle' nom. sg).

=== Assimilative palatalization ===
Paired consonants preceding another consonant often inherit softness from it. This phenomenon in literary language has complicated and evolving rules with many exceptions, depending on what these consonants are, in what morphemic position they meet and to what style of speech the word belongs. In old Moscow pronunciation, softening was more widespread and regular; nowadays some cases that were once normative have become low colloquial or archaic. In fact, consonants can be softened to differing extents, become semi-hard or semi-soft.

The more similar the consonants are, the more they tend to soften each other. Also, some consonants tend to be softened less, such as labials and /r/.

Softening is stronger inside the word root and between root and suffix; it is weaker between prefix and root and weak or absent between a preposition and the word following.

- Before soft dental consonants, /lʲ/ and often soft labial consonants, dental consonants (other than /ts/) are soft.
- /x/ is assimilated to the palatalization of the following velar consonant: лёгких [ˈlʲɵxʲkʲɪx]) ('lungs' gen. pl.).
- Palatalization assimilation of labial consonants before labial consonants is in free variation with nonassimilation, such that бомбить ('to bomb') is either [bʌmˈbʲitʲ] or [bʌmʲˈbʲitʲ] depending on the individual speaker.
- When hard /n/ precedes its soft equivalent, it is also soft and likely to form a single long sound (see gemination). This is slightly less common across affix boundaries.

In addition to this, dental fricatives conform to the place of articulation (not just the palatalization) of following postalveolars: с частью [ˈɕːæsʲtʲjʊ]) ('with a part'). In careful speech, this does not occur across word boundaries.

Russian has the rare feature of nasals not typically being assimilated in place of articulation. Both /n/ and /nʲ/ appear before retroflex consonants: деньжонки [dʲɪnʲˈʐonkʲɪ]) ('money' (scornful)) and ханжой [xʌnˈʐoj]) ('sanctimonious one' instr.). In the same context, other coronal consonants are always hard.

Assimilative palatalization may sometimes also occur across word boundaries as in других гимназий [drʊˈɡʲiɣʲ ɡʲɪmˈnazʲɪj], but such pronunciation is uncommon and characteristic of uncareful speech (except in preposition+main word combinations).

== Consonant clusters ==
As a Slavic language, Russian has fewer phonotactic restrictions on consonants than many other languages, allowing for clusters that would be difficult for English speakers; this is especially so at the beginning of a syllable, where Russian speakers make no sonority distinctions between fricatives and stops. These reduced restrictions begin at the morphological level; outside of two morphemes that contain clusters of four consonants: встрет-/встреч- 'meet' ([ˈfstrʲetʲ/ˈfstrʲetɕ]), and чёрств-/черств- 'stale' ([ˈtɕɵrstv]), native Russian morphemes have a maximum consonant cluster size of three:

3-Segment clusters
	Russian	IPA/Audio	Translation
CCL	скрыва́ть	[skrɨˈvatʲ]	'to hide'
CCN	мгнове́ние	[mɡnɐˈvʲenʲɪje]	'(an) instant'
CCC*	ствол	[stvoɫ]	'tree trunk'
LCL	верблю́д	[vʲɪrˈblʲut]	'camel'
LCC	то́лстый	[ˈtoɫstɨj]	'thick'

For speakers who pronounce [ɕtɕ] instead of [ɕː], words like общий ('common') also constitute clusters of this type.

2-Segment clusters
	Russian	IPA/Audio	Translation
CC	кость	[kosʲtʲ]	'bone'
LC	смерть	[smʲertʲ]	'death'
CL	слепо́й	[slʲɪˈpoj]	'blind'
LL	го́рло	[ˈɡorɫə]	'throat'
CJ	статья́	[stʌˈtʲja]	'article'
LJ	рья́ный	[ˈrʲjanɨj]	'zealous'

If /j/ is considered a consonant in the coda position, then words like айва́ ('quince') contain semivowel+consonant clusters.

Affixation also creates consonant clusters. Some prefixes, the best known being вз-/вс- ([vz-]/[fs-]), produce long word-initial clusters when they attach to a morpheme beginning with consonant(s) (e.g. |fs|+ |pɨʂkə| → вспы́шка [ˈfspɨʂkə] 'flash'). However, the four-consonant limitation persists in the syllable onset.

Clusters of three or more consonants are frequently simplified, usually through syncope of one of them, especially in casual pronunciation.

All word-initial four-consonant clusters begin with [vz] or [fs], followed by a stop (or, in the case of [x], a fricative), and a liquid:

4-Segment clusters
Russian	IPA/Audio	Translation
(ему) взбрело (в голову)	[vzbrʲɪˈɫo]	'(he) took it (into his head)'
взгляд	[ˈvzɡlʲat]	'gaze'
взгромоздиться	[vzɡrəmʌˈzʲdʲitsə]	'to perch'
вздрогнуть	[ˈvzdroɡnʊtʲ]	'to flinch'
всклокоченный	[fskɫʌˈkotɕɪnːɨj]	'disheveled'
вскрыть	[ˈfskrɨtʲ]	'to unseal'
всплеск	[ˈfsplʲesk]	'splash'
вспрыгнуть	[ˈfsprɨɡnʊtʲ]	'to jump up'
встлеть	[ˈfstlʲetʲ]	'to begin to smolder'
встречать	[fstrʲɪˈtɕætʲ]	'to meet'
всхлип	[ˈfsxlʲip]	'whimper'
всхрапывать	[ˈfsxrapɨvətʲ]	'to snort'

Because prepositions in Russian act like clitics, the syntactic phrase composed of a preposition (most notably, the three that consist of just a single consonant: к, с, and в) and a following word constitutes a phonological word that acts like a single grammatical word. This can create a 4-consonant onset cluster not starting in [vz] or [fs]; for example, the phrase в мгнове́ние ('in an instant') is pronounced [vmɡnɐˈvʲenʲɪje].

In the syllable coda, suffixes that contain no vowels may increase the final consonant cluster of a syllable (e.g. Ноя́брьск 'city of Noyabrsk' |noˈjabrʲ|+ |sk| → [nʌˈjabrʲsk]), theoretically up to seven consonants: *мо́нстрств [ˈmonstrstf] ('of monsterhoods'). There is usually an audible release of plosives between these consecutive consonants at word boundaries, the major exception being clusters of homorganic consonants.

Consonant cluster simplification in Russian includes degemination, syncope, dissimilation, and weak vowel insertion. For example, /sɕː/ is pronounced [ɕː], as in расще́лина ('cleft'). There are also a few isolated patterns of apparent cluster reduction (as evidenced by the mismatch between pronunciation and orthography) arguably the result of historical simplifications. For example, dental stops are dropped between a dental continuant and a dental nasal or lateral: ле́стный [ˈlʲesnɨj] 'flattering' (from ле́сть [ˈlʲesʲtʲ] 'flattery'). Other examples include:

/vstv/ > [stv]	чу́вство	'feeling'	[ˈtɕustvə] (not [ˈtɕufstvə])
/ɫnts/ > [nts]	со́лнце	'sun'	[ˈsontse] (not [ˈsoɫntse])
/rdts/ > [rts]	се́рдце	'heart'	[ˈsʲertse] (not [ˈsʲerttse])
/rdtɕ/ > [rtɕ]	сердчи́шко	'heart' (diminutive)	[sʲɪrˈtɕiʂkə] (not [sʲɪrttɕiʂkə])
/ndsk/ > [nsk]	шотла́ндский	'Scottish'	[ʂʌtˈɫanskʲɪj] (not [ʂʌtˈɫantskʲɪj])
/stsk/ > [sːk]	маркси́стский	'Marxist' (adj.)	[mʌrkˈsʲisːkʲɪj] (not [mʌrkˈsʲistskʲɪj])

Compare: со́лнечный [ˈsoɫnʲɪt͡ɕnɨj] 'solar, sunny', серде́чный [sʲɪrˈdʲet͡ɕnɨj] 'heart (adj.), cordial', Шотла́ндия [ʂɐtˈɫanʲdʲɪjə] 'Scotland', маркси́ст [mʌrkˈsʲist] 'Marxist' (person).

The simplifications of consonant clusters are done selectively; bookish-style words and proper nouns are typically pronounced with all consonants even if they fit the pattern. For example, the word голла́ндка is pronounced in a simplified manner [ɡʌˈɫankə] for the meaning of 'Dutch oven' (a popular type of oven in Russia) and in a full form [ɡʌˈɫantkə] for 'Dutch woman' (a more exotic meaning). The orthographic combination ⟨вств⟩ is pronounced [stv] in the words здра́вствуй(те) [ˈzdrastvʊj(tʲe)] 'hello', чу́вство [ˈt͡ɕustvə] 'feeling' (does not have related words with pronounced ⟨в⟩ in the modern language, so the first ⟨в⟩ in the spelling exists only for historical reasons), безмо́лвствовать [bʲɪzˈmoɫstvəvətʲ] 'to be silent', and related words, otherwise pronounced [fstv]: баловство́ [bəɫɐfstˈvo] 'naughtiness'.

In certain cases, this syncope produces homophones, e.g. ко́стный ('bony') and ко́сный ('rigid'), both are pronounced [ˈkosnɨj].

Another method of dealing with consonant clusters is inserting an epenthetic vowel (both in spelling and in pronunciation), ⟨о⟩ after most prepositions and prefixes that normally end in a hard consonant. This includes both historically motivated usage (from historical extra-short vowel ⟨ъ⟩) and cases of its modern extrapolations. There are no strict limits when the epenthetic ⟨о⟩ is obligatory, optional, or prohibited. One of the most typical cases of the epenthetic ⟨о⟩ is between a morpheme-final hard consonant and a cluster starting with the same or similar consonant. E.g. со среды́ 'from Wednesday' |s|+|srʲɪˈdɨ| → [səsrʲɪˈdɨ], not *с среды; ототру́ 'I'll scrub' |ot|+|tru| → [ʌtʌˈtru], not *оттру. The interfix ⟨о⟩ (spelled ⟨е⟩ after soft consonants) is also used in compound words: пищево́д 'œsophagus' (lit. food path) |пища|+|вод| → [pʲɪɕːɪˈvot].

== Stress ==
Stress in Russian is phonemic and therefore unpredictable. It may fall on any syllable, and can vary drastically in similar or related words. For example, in the following table, in the numbers 50 and 60, the stress moves to the last syllable, despite having a structure similar to, say, 70 and 80:

Word	No.
де́сять	10
два́дцать	20
три́дцать	30
со́рок	40
пятьдеся́т	50
шестьдеся́т	60
се́мьдесят	70
во́семьдесят	80
девяно́сто	90

Words can also contrast based just on stress (e.g. му́ка [ˈmukə] 'ordeal, pain, anguish' vs. мука́ [mʊˈka] 'flour, meal, farina'). Stress shifts can even occur within an inflexional paradigm: до́ма [ˈdomə] ('house' gen. sg., or 'at home') vs дома́ [dʌˈma] ('houses'). The place of the stress in a word is determined by the interplay between the morphemes it contains, as morphemes may be obligatorily stressed, obligatorily unstressed, or variably stressed.

Generally, only one syllable in a word is stressed; this rule, however, does not extend to most compound words, such as моро́зоусто́йчивый [mʌˌrozəʊˈstojtɕɪvɨj] ('frost-resistant'), which have multiple stresses, with the last of them being primary.

Phonologically, stressed syllables are mostly realised not only by the lack of aforementioned vowel reduction, but also by a somewhat longer duration than unstressed syllables. More intense pronunciation is also a relevant cue, although this quality may merge with prosodical intensity. Pitch accent has only a minimal role in indicating stress, mostly due to its prosodical importance, which may prove a difficulty for Russians identifying stressed syllables in more pitched languages.

A stress defines a phonological concept of phonetic word — a sequence of morphemes clustered around one nuclear stress. A phonetic word may contain multiple lexical items.

== Supplementary notes ==
There are numerous ways in which Russian spelling does not match pronunciation. The historical transformation of /ɡ/ into /v/ in genitive case endings and the word for 'him' is not reflected in the modern Russian orthography: the pronoun его [jɪˈvo] 'his/him', and the adjectival declension suffixes -ого and -его. Orthographic г represents /x/ in a handful of word roots: легк-/лёгк-/легч- 'easy' and мягк-/мягч- 'soft'. There are a handful of words in which consonants which have long since ceased to be pronounced even in careful pronunciation are still spelled, e.g., the 'l' in солнце [ˈsontsɨ] ('sun').

The phoneme /j/ is often realized as [ʝ] before stressed vowels, especially in emphatic speech. Between any vowel and /i/ (excluding instances across affix boundaries but including unstressed vowels that have merged with /i/), /j/ may be dropped: мои [mʌˈi]('my', pl.), аист [ˈa.ɪst] ('stork'), делает [ˈdʲe.ɫə.ɪt] ('does'). (Halle (1959) cites заезжать and other instances of intervening prefix and preposition boundaries as exceptions to this tendency.) Unstressed sequences /ja/ and /ju/ after vowels may be realized as [æ], [y]: большая [bʌlʲˈʂa.æ] ('big', f.), знаю [ˈzna.y] ('(I) know').

/i/ velarizes hard consonants: ты [tˠɨ] ('you' sing.). /o/ and /u/ velarize and labialize hard consonants and labialize soft consonants: бок [bˠʷok] ('side'), нёс [nʲʷɵs] ('(he) carried'). /o/ is a diphthong [ʊ̯o] or even a triphthong [ʊ̯ɔʌ̯], with a closer lip rounding at the beginning of the vowel that gets progressively weaker, particularly when occurring word-initially or word-finally under stress.

A weak palatal offglide may occur between certain soft consonants and back vowels (e.g. ляжка 'thigh' [ˈlʲi̯aʂkə]).

== See also ==
- Help:IPA/Russian
- Russian alphabet
- Russian orthography
  - Reforms of Russian orthography
- History of the Russian language
- List of Russian language topics
- Index of phonetics articles

== Bibliography ==
- Ageenko, F.L.; Zarva, M.V., eds. (1993), Словарь ударений русского языка (in Russian), Moscow: Russkij Yazyk, pp. 9–31, ISBN 5-200-01127-2
- Ashby, Patricia (2011), Understanding Phonetics, Understanding Language series, Routledge, ISBN 978-0340928271
- Avanesov, R.I. (1975) [1956], Фонетика современного русского литературного языка [Phonetics of modern standard Russian] (in Russian), Leipzig: Zentralantiquariat der DDR
- Avanesov, R.I. (1985), "Сведения о произношении и ударении [Information on pronunciation and stress].", in Borunova, C.N.; Vorontsova, V.L.; Yes'kova, N.A. (eds.), Орфоэпический словарь русского языка. Произношение. Ударение. Грамматические формы [Orthoepical dictionary of the Russian language. Pronunciation. Stress. Grammatical forms] (in Russian) (2nd ed.), pp. 659–684
- Barkhudarov, S. G; Protchenko, I. F; Skvortsova, L. I, eds. (1987). Орфографический словарь русского языка [Orthographic Russian dictionary] (in Russian) (25th ed.).
- Barkhudarov, S. G; Kryuchkov, S.E. (1960), Учебник русского языка, ч. 1. Фонетика и морфология. Для 5-го и 6-го классов средней школы (7th ed.), Moscow
- Barkhudarov, S. G; Kryuchkov, S.E. (1961), Учебник русского языка, ч. 1. Фонетика и морфология. Для 5-го и 6-го классов средней школы (8th ed.), Moscow
- Bickel, Balthasar; Nichols, Johanna (2007), "Inflectional morphology", in Shopen, Timothy (ed.), Language Typology and Syntactic Description. Vol. III: Grammatical categories and the lexicon. (2nd ed.), London: Routledge, pp. Chapter 3
- Bidwell, Charles (1962), "An Alternate Phonemic Analysis of Russian", The Slavic and East European Journal, 6 (2), American Association of Teachers of Slavic and East European Languages: 125–129, doi:10.2307/3086096, JSTOR 3086096
- Borunova, C.N.; Vorontsova, V.L.; Yes'kova, N.A., eds. (1983), Орфоэпический словарь русского языка. Произношение. Ударение. Грамматические формы [Orthoepical dictionary of the Russian language. Pronunciation. Stress. Grammatical forms] (in Russian) (2nd ed.), pp. 659–684
- Chew, Peter A. (2003), A computational phonology of Russian, Universal Publishers
- Chrabaszcz, A.; Winn, M.; Lin, C. Y.; Idsardi, W. J. (2014), "Acoustic Cues to Perception of Word Stress by English, Mandarin, and Russian Speakers", Journal of Speech, Language, and Hearing Research, 57 (4): 1468–79, doi:10.1044/2014_JSLHR-L-13-0279, PMC 5503100, PMID 24686836
- Crosswhite, Katherine Margaret (2000), "Vowel Reduction in Russian: A Unified Accountof Standard, Dialectal, and 'Dissimilative' Patterns" (PDF), University of Rochester Working Papers in the Language Sciences, 1 (1): 107–172, archived from the original (PDF) on 2012-02-06
- Cubberley, Paul (2002), Russian: A Linguistic Introduction, Cambridge University Press, ISBN 9780521796415
- Davidson, Lisa; Roon, Kevin (2008), "Durational correlates for differentiating consonant sequences in Russian", Journal of the International Phonetic Association, 38 (2): 137–165, doi:10.1017/S0025100308003447, S2CID 1105370
- Dobrodomov, I. G.; Izmest'eva, I. A. (2002), "Беззаконная фонема /ʔ/ в русском языке.", Проблемы фонетики, IV: 36–52
- Dobrodomov, I. G.; Izmest'eva, I. A. (2009), "Роль гортанного смычного согласного в изменении конца слова после падения редуцированных гласных" [Guttural obstruent role in the word end alternation after reduced vowels fall] (PDF), Известия Самарского научного центра Российской академии наук, 11, 4 (4): 1001–1005
- Folejewski, Z (1962), "[An Alternate Phonemic Analysis of Russian]: Editorial comment", The Slavic and East European Journal, 6 (2): 129–130, doi:10.2307/3086097, JSTOR 3086097
- Halle, Morris (1959), Sound Pattern of Russian, MIT Press
- Hamann, Silke (2004), "Retroflex fricatives in Slavic languages" (PDF), Journal of the International Phonetic Association, 34 (1): 53–67, doi:10.1017/S0025100304001604, S2CID 2224095, archived from the original (PDF) on 2015-04-14
- Jones, Daniel; Trofimov, M. V. (1923). The pronunciation of Russian. Cambridge: Cambridge University Press.
- Jones, Daniel; Ward, Dennis (1969), The Phonetics of Russian, Cambridge University Press, ISBN 9780521153003
- Koneczna, Halina; Zawadowski, Witold (1956), Obrazy rentgenograficzne głosek rosyjskich, Warsaw: Państwowe Wydawnictwo Naukowe
- Krech, Eva Maria; Stock, Eberhard; Hirschfeld, Ursula; Anders, Lutz-Christian (2009), "7.3.13 Russisch", Deutsches Aussprachewörterbuch, Berlin, New York: Walter de Gruyter, ISBN 978-3-11-018202-6
- Kuznetsov, V.V.; Ryzhakov, M.V., eds. (2007), Универсальный справочник школьника [Pupil's universal reference book], Moscow, ISBN 978-5-373-00858-7
- Ladefoged, Peter; Maddieson, Ian (1996), The Sounds of the World's Languages, Blackwell Publishing, ISBN 0-631-19815-6
- Lightner, Theodore M. (1972), Problems in the Theory of Phonology, I: Russian phonology and Turkish phonology, Edmonton: Linguistic Research, inc
- Mathiassen, Terje (1996), A Short Grammar of Lithuanian, Slavica Publishers, Inc., ISBN 978-0893572679
- Matiychenko, A.S. (1950), Грамматика русского языка. Часть первая. Фонетика, морфология. Учебник для VIII и IX классов нерусских школ. [Russian grammar. Part 1. Phonetics, morphology. Textbook for the 8th and 9th grades of non-Russian schools] (2nd ed.), Moscow
- Ostapenko, Olesya (2005), "The Optimal L2 Russian Syllable Onset" (PDF), LSO Working Papers in Linguistics, 5: Proceedings of WIGL 2005: 140–151, archived from the original (PDF) on 2010-06-10
- Ozhegov, S. I. (1953). Словарь русского языка [Russian dictionary].
- Padgett, Jaye (2001), "Contrast Dispersion and Russian Palatalization", in Hume, Elizabeth; Johnson, Keith (eds.), The Role of Speech Perception in Phonology, Academic Press, pp. 187–218, doi:10.1163/9789004454095
- Padgett, Jaye (2003a), "Contrast and Post-Velar Fronting in Russian", Natural Language & Linguistic Theory, 21 (1): 39–87, doi:10.1023/A:1021879906505, S2CID 13470826
- Padgett, Jaye (2003b), "The Emergence of Contrastive Palatalization in Russian", in Holt, D. Eric (ed.), Optimality Theory and Language Change
- Padgett, Jaye; Tabain, Marija (2005), "Adaptive Dispersion Theory and Phonological Vowel Reduction in Russian" (PDF), Phonetica, 62 (1): 14–54, doi:10.1159/000087223, PMID 16116302, S2CID 2551922, archived from the original (PDF) on 2007-09-27
- Proctor, Michael (December 2009), Gestural characterization of a phonological class: the liquids (PDF) (Dissertation), Yale University
- Rubach, Jerzy (2000), "Backness switch in Russian", Phonology, 17 (1): 39–64, doi:10.1017/s0952675700003821, S2CID 233319763
- Schenker, Alexander M. (2002), "Proto-Slavonic", in Comrie, Bernard; Corbett, Greville. G. (eds.), The Slavonic Languages, London: Routledge, pp. 60–124, ISBN 0-415-28078-8
- Shapiro, Michael (1993), "Russian Non-Distinctive Voicing: A Stocktaking", Russian Linguistics, 17 (1): 1–14, doi:10.1007/bf01839412, S2CID 170999345
- Shcherba, Lev V., ed. (1950). Грамматика русского языка. Часть I. Фонетика и морфология. Учебник для 5-го и 6-го классов семилетней и средней школы [Russian grammar. Part 1. Phonetics and morphology. Textbook for the fifth and sixth grades of seven-year school and high school] (in Russian) (11th ed.). Moscow.
- Skalozub, Larisa (1963), Palatogrammy i Rentgenogrammy Soglasnyx Fonem Russkogo Literaturnogo Jazyka, Izdatelstvo Kievskogo Universiteta
- Stankiewicz, E. (1962), "[An Alternate Phonemic Analysis of Russian]: Editorial comment", The Slavic and East European Journal, 6 (2), American Association of Teachers of Slavic and East European Languages: 131–132, doi:10.2307/3086098, JSTOR 3086098
- Timberlake, Alan (2004), "Sounds", A Reference Grammar of Russian, Cambridge University Press, ISBN 9780521772921
- Toporov, V. N. (1971), "О дистрибутивных структурах конца слова в современном русском языке", in Vinogradov, V. V. (ed.), Фонетика, фонология, грамматика, Moscow
- Vinogradov, V. V., История Слов:Суть
- Yanushevskaya, Irena; Bunčić, Daniel (2015), "Russian" (PDF), Journal of the International Phonetic Association, 45 (2): 221–228, doi:10.1017/S0025100314000395
- Zarva, M.V. (1993), "Правила произношения" [Rules of pronunciation], in Ageenko, F.L.; Zarva, M.V. (eds.), Словарь ударений русского языка (in Russian), Moscow: Russkij Yazyk, pp. 9–31, ISBN 5-200-01127-2
- Zemsky, A. M; Svetlayev, M. V; Kriuchkov, S. E (1971). Русский язык. Часть 1. Лексикология, фонетика и морфология. Учебник для педагогических училищ [Russian. I. Lexicography, phonetics, and morphology. Textbook for teachers' colleges] (in Russian) (11th ed.).
- Zsiga, Elizabeth (2003), "Articulatory Timing in a Second Language: Evidence from Russian and English", Studies in Second Language Acquisition, 25: 399–432, doi:10.1017/s0272263103000160, S2CID 5998807
- Zygis, Marzena (2003), "Phonetic and Phonological Aspects of Slavic Sibilant Fricatives" (PDF), ZAS Papers in Linguistics, 3: 175–213, doi:10.21248/zaspil.32.2003.191, archived from the original (PDF) on 2017-10-11
