= Rules of Russian Orthography and Punctuation =

Collection of Russian orthographic rules

The Rules of Russian Orthography and Punctuation (Russian: Правила русской орфографии и пунктуации, tr.: Pravila russkoj orfografii i punktuacii) of 1956 is the current reference to regulate the modern Russian language. Approved by the Academy of Sciences of the USSR, Soviet Ministries of Education and Higher Education, it also became the first legally fixed obligatory set of rules. However, it became a rare book and its principles are learned from school-books and manuals based upon it.

The rules it lays down have been criticised for incompleteness in some cases. In particular, the spellings of such words as maître (мэтр, metr) or racket (рэкет, reket) are given with "э", whereas in other rules there are three fixed words in which a hard consonant is followed by "э": peer (пэр, per), mayor (мэр, mer) and sir (сэр, ser). In 1990 an attempt was made to fill the gaps in the Rules of Russian Orthography and Punctuation.

== See also ==
- 1964 proposed reform of Russian language
- Russian orthography
