= Russian spelling rules =

In Russian, the term spelling rule is used to describe a number of rules relating to the spelling of words in the language that would appear in most cases to deviate from a strictly phonetic transcription.

All the spelling rules found in the Russian language dictate that certain consonants cannot be followed either under any circumstance or in an unstressed syllable by certain vowels. In most cases where spelling rules exist, they do not actually affect the pronunciation. This is a result of the fact that five of the eight Russian consonants for which spelling rules of one sort or another apply can only be either "hard" or "soft" and cannot be both. Only with the three velar consonants, which like most Russian consonants have both a hard and a soft form, does the spelling rule actually reflect phonetically based pronunciation.

Spelling rules are of major importance in the study of Russian morphology. They have a very considerable effect on the declension of nouns and adjectives and the conjugation of verbs because many of the endings produce consonant-vowel combinations that the spelling rules strictly forbid. In some cases where stress dictates whether or not a spelling rule is to be applied, "mixed declensions" can result. Russian grammar goes so far as to dictate that the spelling rules must take precedence over any other rule.

Exceptions from the spelling rules are found in loanwords. For example, брошюра, жюри, парашют, жокей, шофёр, шоколад.

== Basic Russian Spelling Rules ==
- Spelling Rule #1
  - After the velar consonants г, к, and х:
  - and the sibilant consonants ж, ч, ш, щ:
    - one must never write the "hard" vowel ы, but must always replace it with its "soft" equivalent и, even though after ж and ш, и is pronounced as if it were written ы.
- Spelling Rule #2
  - After the velar consonants г, к, and х:
  - the sibilant consonants ж, ч, ш, щ
  - and the hard consonant ц:
    - one must never write the "soft" vowel ю, but must always replace it with its "hard" equivalent у, even though after ч and щ, у is pronounced as if it were written ю.
    - one must never write the "soft" vowel я, but must always replace it with its "hard" equivalent а, even though after ч and щ, а is pronounced as if it were written я.
- Spelling Rule #3
  - After the sibilant consonants ж, ч, ш, щ and the hard consonant ц:
    - one must never write the letter о unless the syllable in which the о is to be added in the suffix is stressed.
    - if the syllable in which the о is to be added in the suffix is unstressed, then one must always write е.

This spelling rule does not have a great deal of effect on actual Russian pronunciation, because when unstressed, the vowels о and е are weakened to a very weak sound like the schwa.
Note that this rule relates to the fact that stressed о after ж, ч, ш and щ is pronounced the same as the always-stressed letter ё after the same letters. When stress changes, ё invariably becomes е.
The stressed letters о and ё after ж, ч, ш and щ are used according to the following rules:

  - Roots are spelled with ё if they have an unstressed variant with е: жёлтый — желтеть, чёрный — чернеть.
  - The letter о is used in Russian roots that have no unstressed variants, such as шорох, трущоба, and in loanwords such as капюшон, мажор.
  - In nominal inflections and derivations, the letter о is used, e.g. нож — ножом, ножовка.
  - In verbal inflections and derivations, the letter ё is used, e.g. беречь — бережём, корчевать — корчёвка, дирижировать — дирижёр.
  - The nouns ожог, поджог, изжога are spelled with о, whereas the verbal forms ожёг, поджёг, изжёг are spelled with ё.
  - The prepositional case of что is spelled (о) чём; the spelling is conserved in its derivatives причём, нипочём.
  - In surnames, the spelling may vary: Чернышов, Ткачов, Борщов and Чернышёв, Ткачёв, Борщёв are existing surnames. The geographical name Вышний Волочёк is spelled with ё despite the common noun волочок.

After ц, the stressed letter о is always used, never ё, so one writes облицовка (stressed о), but облицевать (unstressed е). Exceptionally, unstressed о is conserved in derivatives of цокот: цокотать, цокотуха.

- Spelling Rule #4
  - If any of the vowels, ь, й or я is at the end of a word, it is dropped in order to add another suffix. This is the case with many feminine and masculine (those ending in й) nouns in Russian:
    - One must always replace the ь, й or я with и and never with ы, even though after ж, ш, and ц, и is pronounced as if it were written ы and other suffixes for nouns allow ы after the always-hard consonant ц.

Summary & Comparison
	ы↔и	у↔ю	а↔я	о↔ё/е
Velars г, к, х	и	у	а	о
Sibilants ж, ч, ш, щ	и	у	а	о/ё/е
Affricate ц	ы/и	у	а	о/е
After ж, ч, ш, щ, and ц, the letters о and ё are used if the syllable is stressed; е is used otherwise

The letter и after ц is used in roots, but endings use ы; see Tse (Cyrillic) for details.

Notice that there is no rule for the fifth hard/soft pair э↔е: this is because, except for a small handful of loanwords, the letter э is only ever used at the beginning of a word when it must be understood that the vowel is hard. In the middle and at the end of words, е is preferred even if the vowel would be pronounced as a hard э sound.

== See also ==
- Russian orthography
