= Yakov Grot =

Russian philologist (1812–1893)

Yakov Karlovich Grot
- Яков Карлович Грот
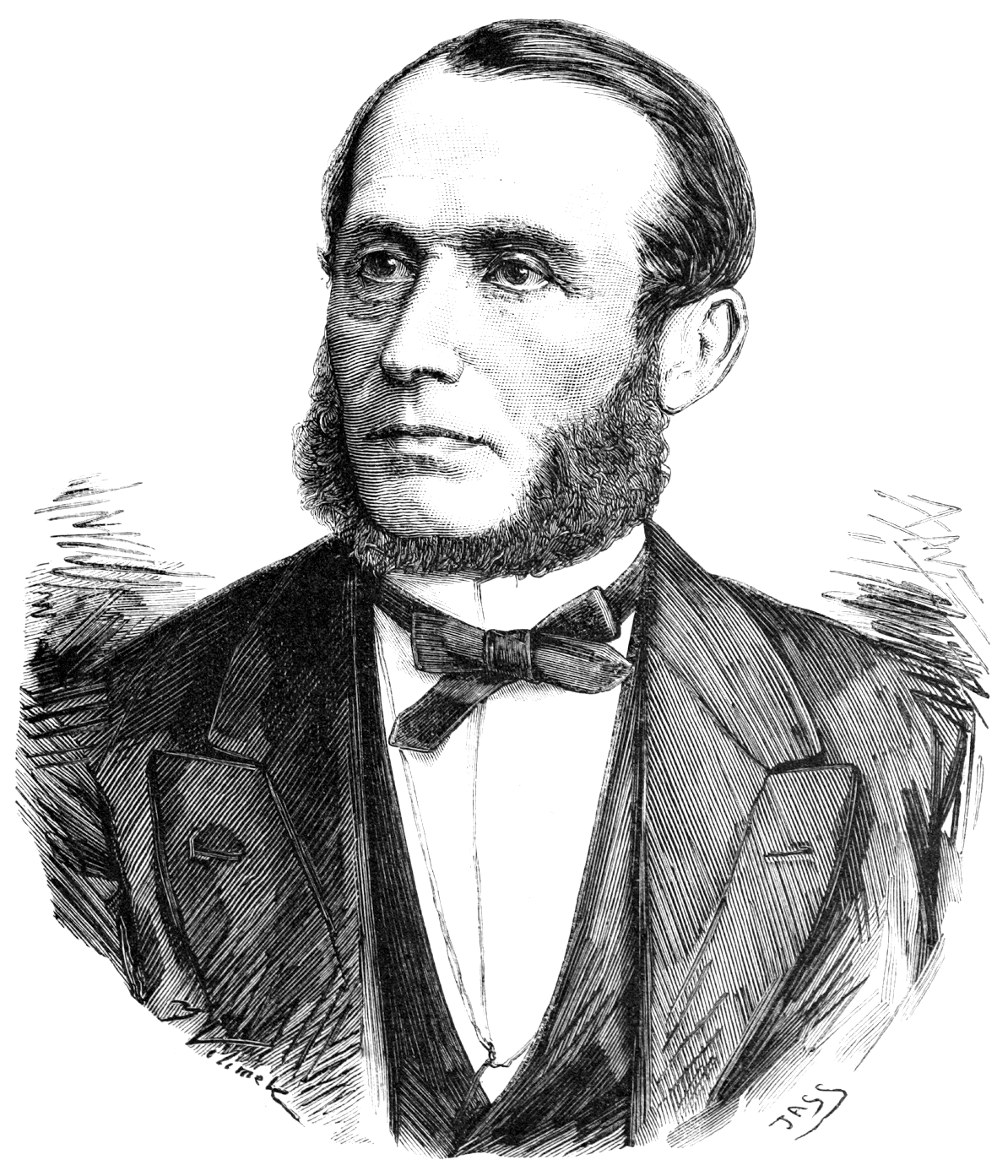
- Grot in 1882
- Born: 27 December 1812; Saint Petersburg, Russian Empire
- Died: 5 June 1893 (aged 80); Saint Petersburg, Russian Empire
- Burial place: Novodevichy Cemetery, St. Petersburg
- Citizenship: Russian Empire
- Education: Tsarskoye Selo Lyceum
- Occupation: Philologist
- Employer: Petersburg Academy of Sciences
- Spouse: Natalya Semyonova (m. 1850)
- Children: 7, including Nikolai and Konstantin

Yakov Karlovich Grot (Russian: Я́ков Ка́рлович Грот; 27 December [O.S. 15 December] 1812 – 5 June [O.S. 24 May] 1893) was a Russian philologist of German extraction who worked at the University of Helsinki.

Grot was a graduate of the Tsarskoye Selo Lyceum. In his lifetime, he gained fame for his translations of German and Scandinavian poetry, his work on the theory of Russian orthography, lexicography, and grammar, and his approach to literary editing and criticism, exemplified in a full edition of the works of Derzhavin (1864–1883). His Russian Orthography (1878, 1885) ("Русское правописание", Russkoye pravopisaniye) became the standard textbook of Russian spelling and punctuation until superseded by the decrees of 1917–1918, although his definition of the theoretical foundations remains little changed to this day. Shortly before his death, he assumed the compilation of the Academic Dictionary of Russian (1891–1923), which, although continued by Aleksey Shakhmatov, was never to be completed. He was a member of the Russian Academy of Sciences from 1858, its chairman from 1884, and its vice-president from 1889. He was appointed Russian-language tutor to the future tsars Alexander II and Alexander III.

His spelling primers "reduced words to historical hieroglyphs of a kind, mismatched with the living spoken language of most Russians"; later linguists like Baudouin de Courtenay and Filipp Fortunatov promoted reforms that would make spelling a better reflection of spoken language.
