= Russian orthography =

Type of orthography

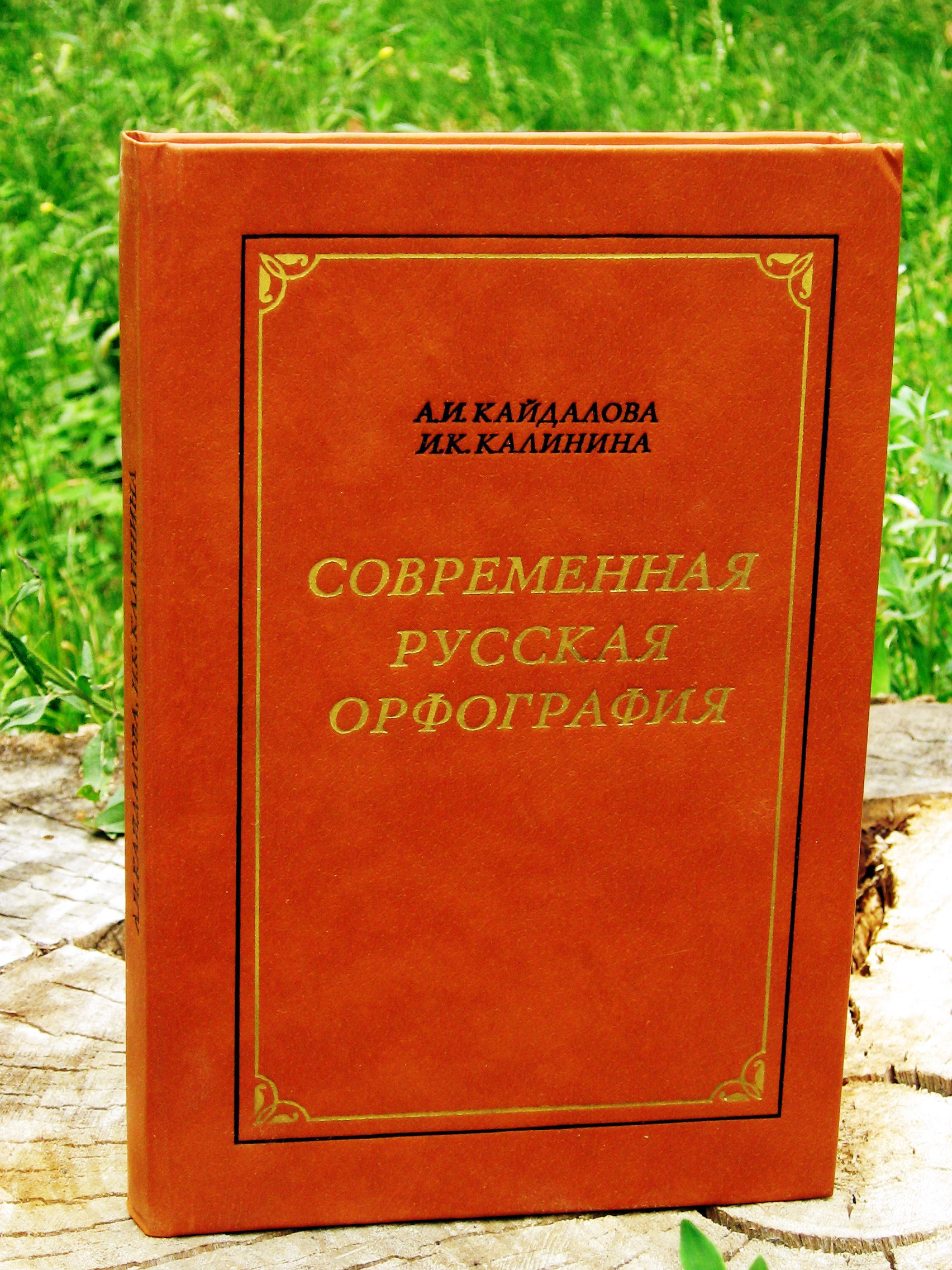
Modern Russian Orthography (1973), an orthographic manual.

Russian orthography (Russian: правописа́ние, romanized: pravopisaniye, IPA: [prəvəpʲɪˈsanʲɪjə]) is an orthographic tradition formally considered to encompass spelling (Russian: орфогра́фия, romanized: orfografiya, IPA: [ɐrfɐˈɡrafʲɪjə]) and punctuation (Russian: пунктуа́ция, romanized: punktuatsiya, IPA: [pʊnktʊˈat͡sɨjə]). Russian spelling, which is mostly phonemic in practice, is a mix of morphological and phonetic principles, with a few etymological or historic forms, and occasional grammatical differentiation. The punctuation, originally based on Byzantine Greek, was in the seventeenth and eighteenth centuries reformulated on the models of French and German orthography.

== Spelling ==
Russian is written with a modern variant of the Cyrillic script. Russian spelling typically avoids arbitrary digraphs. Except for the use of hard and soft signs, which have no phonetic value in isolation but can follow a consonant letter, no phoneme is ever represented with more than one letter.

=== Morphological principle ===
Under the morphological principle, the morphemes (roots, suffixes, infixes, and inflexional endings) are attached without modification; the compounds may be further agglutinated. For example, the long adjective шарикоподшипниковый, sharikopodshipnikoviy [ʂarʲɪkəpɐtˈʂɨpnʲɪkəvɨj] ('pertaining to ball bearings'), may be decomposed as follows (words having independent existence in boldface):

**шар** /ˈʂar/	ик /ik/	o /o/	**под** /pod/	**шип** /ˈʂip/	ник /nʲik/	ов /ov/	ый /ij/
'sphere'	diminutive suffix	connecting interfix	'under' (preposition or prefix)	'pin'	suffix indicating subject, intended for what is called by the stem (thus 'something to lay under pin')	adjectival suffix of property or innateness	inflexional ending, nominative masculine singular ending of adjectives
**шарик** [ˈʂarʲɪk] 'little sphere', 'ball'		о	**подшипник** [pɐtˈʂɨpnʲɪk] 'bearing'			ов	ый
**шарикоподшипник** [ʂarʲɪkəpɐtˈʂɨpnʲɪk] 'ball bearing'						овый
**шарикоподшипниковый** [ʂarʲɪkəpɐtˈʂɨpnʲɪkəvɨj] 'pertaining to ball bearings'

Note again that each component in the final production retains its basic form, despite the vowel reduction.

The phonetic assimilation of consonant clusters also does not usually violate the morphological principle of the spelling. For example, the decomposition of счастье [ˈɕːasʲtʲjɪ] ('happiness, good fortune') is as follows:

**с**	**часть**	е
/s/	/ˈt͡ɕasʲtʲ/	/jə/
'good' (< *sъ- (good), as in Sanskrit su- 'good')	'part' (here in the related meaning 'fate')	(ending of abstract noun of state - neutrum singular nominative)

Note the assimilation with ⟨сч⟩- so that it represents the same sound (or cluster) as ⟨щ⟩-. The spelling <щастие> was fairly common among the literati in the eighteenth century, but is usually frowned upon today.

=== Phonetic principle ===
The phonetic principle implies that:

- all morphemes are written as they are pronounced in isolation, without vowel reduction, Church Slavonic style, or, more strictly, taking inflexion into account (this in combination with the morphological agglutination described above is sometimes called the morphemic principle);
- certain prefixes that end in a voiced consonant (in practice, only those in -⟨з⟩ /z/) have that consonant devoiced (become [s]) to voicing assimilation. This may be reflected orthographically. For example, for the prefix/preposition без [bʲez] 'without':

**без**умный	[bʲɪˈzumnɨj]	'mindless', 'mad' (ум [um] 'mind')
**бес**смертный	[bʲɪsˈsmʲertnɨj]	'immortal' (смерть [smʲertʲ] 'death')

- certain roots and prefixes occasionally have their vowel modified in individual cases to reflect historical changes in pronunciation, usually as a result of being unstressed or, conversely, stressed. In practice, this usually applies to -⟨o⟩- /o/ changing to -⟨a⟩- [ɐ] or [ə] (akanye), and alternations between the allophonic vowels [ɨ] and [i] (represented by ⟨ы⟩ and ⟨и⟩ respectively):

**рост**	[ˈrost]	'growth'
**расти**	[rɐˈsʲtʲi]	'to grow'
**история**	[ɪˈstorʲɪjə]	'history'
**предыстория**	[prʲɪdɨˈstorʲɪjə]	'prehistory'

- borrowed words and foreign names are usually spelled as orthographic transcriptions, or, more precisely, mixed transcriptions-transliterations based mainly on original pronunciation (Jacques-Yves Cousteau is rendered in Russian as Жак-Ив Кусто; the English name Paul is rendered as Пол, the French name Paul as Поль, the German name Paul as Пауль) but also on original spelling (the German surnames Schmied, Schmidt, Schmitt are rendered in Russian as Шмид, Шмидт, Шмитт). In particular, double consonants are usually retained from original spelling when their pronunciation is not normally geminated. In addition, unpalatalized consonants are usually followed by ⟨е⟩ rather than ⟨э⟩ (e.g. кафе [kɐˈfɛ],'café'); 19th-century linguists, such as Yakov Karlovich Grot, considered unpalatalized pronunciation of consonants before /e/ to be foreign to Russian, though this has now become the standard for many loanwords.

Pronunciation may also deviate from normal phonological rules. For example, unstressed /o/ (spelled ⟨о⟩) is usually pronounced [ɐ] or [ə], but радио ('radio') is pronounced [ˈradʲɪo], with an unstressed final [o].

=== Etymological principle ===
The fact that Russian has retained much of its ancient phonology has made the historical or etymological principle (dominant in languages like English, French, and Irish) less relevant. Because the spelling has been adjusted to reflect the changes in the pronunciation of the yers and to eliminate letters with identical pronunciation, the only systematic examples occur in some foreign words and in some of the inflectional endings, both nominal and verbal, which are not always written as they are pronounced, as is the case in the adjectival and pronominal masculine/neuter genitive singular ending -ого/-его:

**русского**	[ˈruskəvə] **not** *[ˈruskoɡo]	'Russian'
**нашего**	[ˈnaʂɨvə] **not** *[ˈnaʂɨɡə]	'ours'

=== Grammatical principle ===
The grammatical principle has become stronger in contemporary Russian. It specifies conventional orthographic forms to mark grammatic distinctions (gender, participle vs. adjective, and so on). Some of these rules are ancient, and could perhaps be considered etymological; some are based in part on subtle, and not necessarily universal, distinctions in pronunciation; and some are practically arbitrary. Some characteristic examples follow.

For nouns ending in a sibilant -⟨ж⟩ /ʐ/, -⟨ш⟩ /ʂ/, -⟨щ⟩ /ɕː/, -⟨ч⟩ /t͡ɕ/, a soft sign ⟨ь⟩ is appended in the nominative singular if the gender is feminine, and is not appended if masculine:

**дочь**	[ˈdot͡ɕ]	daughter **F**	-
**меч**	[ˈmʲet͡ɕ]	sword **M**	-
**грач**	[ˈɡrat͡ɕ]	rook (Corvus frugilegus) **M**	modern levelling; Lomonosov (1755) gives грачь

Neither of the aforementioned consonants has phonemically distinct palatalized and unpalatalized variants. Hence, the use of ⟨ь⟩ in these examples is not to indicate a different pronunciation, but to help distinguish different grammatical genders. A common noun ending in a consonant without -⟨ь⟩ is masculine while a noun ending in -⟨ь⟩ is often feminine (though there are some masculine nouns ending in a "soft" consonant, with the -⟨ь⟩ marking a different pronunciation).
Though based on common ancient etymology, by which a hard sign ъ was appended to masculine nouns before 1918, both symbols having once been pronounced as ultra-short ("reduced") vowels (called yers in Slavic studies), the modern rule is nevertheless grammatical, because its application has been made more nearly universal.

The past passive participle has a doubled -⟨нн⟩- /nn/, while the same word used as an adjective has a single -⟨н⟩- /n/:

**варёный**	[vɐˈrʲɵnɨj]	'cooked/boiled'
**варенный**	[ˈvarʲɪnnɨj]	'(something that has) been cooked/boiled'
**жареный**	[ˈʐarʲɪnɨj]	'fried'
**жаренный**	[ˈʐarʲɪnnɨj]	'(something that has) been fried'

This rule is partly guided by pronunciation, but the geminated pronunciation is not universal. The rule is therefore considered one of the difficult points of Russian spelling, since the distinction between adjective (implying state) and participle (implying action) is not always clear. A proposal in the late 1990s to simplify this rule by basing the distinction on whether or not the verb is transitive has not been formally adopted.

Prepositional phrases in which the literal meaning is preserved are written with the words separated; when used adverbially, especially if the meaning has shifted, they are usually written as a single word:

**во время (чего-либо)**	[vɐ ˈvrʲemʲə]	'during the time (of something)'
**(он пришёл) вовремя**	[ˈvovrʲɪmʲə]	'(he arrived) on time'

(This is extracted from a whole set of extremely detailed rules about run-together, hyphenated, or separated components. Such rules are essentially arbitrary. There are enough sub-cases, exceptions, undecidable points, and inconsistencies that even well-educated native speakers sometimes have to check in a dictionary. Arguments about this issue have been continuous for 150 years.)

== Punctuation ==
=== Basic symbols ===
The full stop (period) (.), colon (:), semicolon (;), comma (,), question mark (?), exclamation mark (!), and ellipsis (…) are equivalent in shape to the basic symbols of punctuation (знаки препинания [ˈznakʲɪ prʲɪpʲɪˈnanʲɪjə]) used for the common European languages, and follow the same general principles of usage.

The colon is used exclusively as a means of introduction, and never, as in slightly archaic English, to mark a periodic pause intermediate in strength between the semicolon and the full stop (period) (cf. H.W. Fowler, The Kingˈs English, 1908).

=== Comma usage ===
The comma is used very liberally to mark the end of introductory phases, on either side of simple appositions, and to introduce all subordinate clauses. The English distinction between restrictive and non-restrictive clauses does not exist:

Итак, царя свергли!	So the tsar has been overthrown!
Мужчина, которого вы вчера сбили, умер.	The man you ran over yesterday has died.
Это странное явление, о котором так часто пишут в газетах, так и остаётся без научного объяснения.	This strange phenomenon, which is so often reported in the press, remains unexplained by science.

=== Hyphenation ===
The hyphen (-), and em dash (—) are used to mark increasing levels of separation. The hyphen is put between components of a word, and the em-dash to separate words in a sentence, in particular to mark longer appositions or qualifications that in English would typically be put in parentheses, and as a replacement for a copula:

Наш телефон: 242-01-42.	Our telephone: 242-0142. or Our telephone is 242-0142.
Без сильной команды — такой, которую в прошлом собирал и тренировал Тихонов — Россия не взяла золотую медаль на Олимпиаде-2002.	Without a strong team — like the one that Tikhonov in the past selected and trained — Russia did not win the gold medal at the 2002 Olympics.

In short sentences describing a noun (but generally not a pronoun unless special poetic emphasis is desired) in present tense (as a substitution for a modal verb "быть/есть" (to be)):

Мой брат — инженер, его начальник — негодяй. Этот дом — памятник архитектуры (but: Я студент, он водитель.).	My brother is an engineer, his boss is a scoundrel. This building is an architectural landmark. ('I am a student, he is a driver.')

=== Direct speech ===
Quotes are not used to mark paragraphed direct quotation, which is instead separated out by the em-dash (—):

— Я Вас обожаю! — сказал мишка лисе.	'I adore you!' said the bear to the fox.

=== Quotation ===
Inlined direct speech and other quotation is marked at the first level by guillemets «», and by lowered and raised reversed double quotes („“) at the second:

Гончаров начинает «Фрегат „Паллада“» словами: «Меня удивляет».	'Goncharov begins his "Frigate Pallada" with the words: "I am surprised."'

Unlike American English, the period or other terminal punctuation is placed outside the quotation. As the example above demonstrates, the quotes are often used to mark the names of entities introduced with the generic word.

=== Parenthetical expressions ===
These are introduced with the international symbol of parentheses (). However, their use is typically restricted to pure asides, rather than, as in English, to mark apposition.

=== Titles of works ===
Titles of works are marked with quotation marks:

Я читаю «Преступление и наказание».	I'm reading Crime and Punishment.

== Capitalisation ==
As in English, each word of personal names is capitalised, except for foreign-language function words:

- Александр Сергеевич Пушкин — Alexander Sergeevich Pushkin
- Красная Шапочка — Little Red Riding Hood (literally "Little Red Hat")
- Людвиг ван Бетховен — Ludwig van Beethoven

Common nouns derived from personal names are uncapitalised:

- кольт — Colt (revolver)
- вольт — volt
- дарвинизм — Darwinism

Possessive adjectives derived from personal nouns with suffixes -ов (-ев) -ин are capitalised, except in idioms:

- Шекспировы трагедии — Shakespeare's tragedies
- ахиллесова пята — Achilles' heel

Possessive adjectives derived from personal nouns with suffix -ск- (-овск-/-евск-, -инск-) are uncapitalised:

- шекспировские трагедии — Shakespearean tragedies

Unlike English, in Russian the titles of texts and works of art use sentence case, i.e. only the first word is capitalised (along with any proper nouns that would be capitalised in other contexts):

- Устав ООН — UN Charter
- «Преступление и наказание» — Crime and Punishment (novel)
- «Один день Ивана Денисовича» — One Day in the Life of Ivan Denisovich (novel)
- «Московские новости» — Moscow News (newspaper)

Names of months and days of the week are not capitalized:

- декабрь — December
- вторник — Tuesday

== Controversies ==
=== Spelling ===
As in many languages, the spelling was formerly quite more phonemic and less consistent. However, the influence of the major grammarians, from Meletius Smotrytsky (1620s) to Lomonosov (1750s) to Grot (1880s), ensured a more careful application of morphology and etymology.

Today, the balance between the morphological and phonetic principles is well established. The etymological inflexions are maintained by tradition and habit, although their non-phonetic spelling has occasionally prompted controversial calls for reform (as in the periods 1900–1910, 1960–1964). A primary area where the spelling is utterly inconsistent and therefore controversial is the complexity (or even correctness) of some of the grammatical principles, especially with respect to the strung-together, hyphenated, or disjoint writing of the constituent morphemes.

These two points have been the topic of scientific debate since at least the middle of the nineteenth century.

In the past, uncertainty abounded about which of the ordinary or iotated/palatalizing series of vowels to allow after the sibilant consonants ⟨ж⟩ [ʐ], ⟨ш⟩ [ʂ], ⟨щ⟩ [ɕ:], ⟨ц⟩ [ts], ⟨ч⟩ [tɕ], which, as mentioned above, are not standard in their hard/soft pairs. This problem, however, appears to have been resolved by applying the phonetic and grammatical principles (and to a lesser extent, the etymological) to define a complicated though internally consistent set of spelling rules.

In 2000–2001, a minor revision of the 1956 codification was proposed. It was met with public protest and has not been formally adopted.

== 1917 reform ==
The Old Cyrillic letter 'yat', replaced with ⟨е⟩ in 1917

Russian orthography was simplified in 1917 by unifying several adjectival and pronominal inflections, conflating the letter ѣ (Yat) with е, ѳ with ф, and і and ѵ with и. Additionally, the archaic mute yer became obsolete, including the ъ (the "hard sign") in final position following consonants (thus eliminating practically the last graphical remnant of the Old Slavonic open-syllable system). For instance, Рыбинскъ became Рыбинск ("Rybinsk").

Examples:

- Сѣверо-Американскіе Соединенные Штаты to Северо-Американские Соединённые Штаты – The United States of America (lit. ' North American United States', popular pre-revolutionary name of the United States in Russia)
- Россія to Россия
- Петроградъ to Петроград (Petrograd)
- раіонъ to район (region/district)
- мараѳонъ to марафон (marathon)
- дѣти to дети (children)
- Іисусъ Христосъ to Иисус Христос (Jesus Christ)

== See also ==
- Russian language
- Russian alphabet
- Cyrillic script
- Cyrillic alphabets
- Rules of Russian Orthography and Punctuation
- Yoficator

== Sources ==
- Друговейко-Должанская, Светлана Викторовна; Попов, Михаил Борисович (2019). Современное русское письмо: графика, орфография, пунктуация: Терминологический словарь (PDF). Москва: Издательство Санкт-Петербургского университета. ISBN 978-5-288-05942-1.
- Лопатин, Владимир Владимирович, ed. (2007). Правила русской орфографии и пунктуации. Москва: Эксмо. ISBN 978-5-699-18553-5.
- Wade, Terence; Gillespie, David; Gurel, Svetlana; Korneeva, Marina (2020) [1992]. A Comprehensive Russian Grammar (4th ed.). Wiley-Blackwell. ISBN 9781119520290.
