= Slava Rossii =

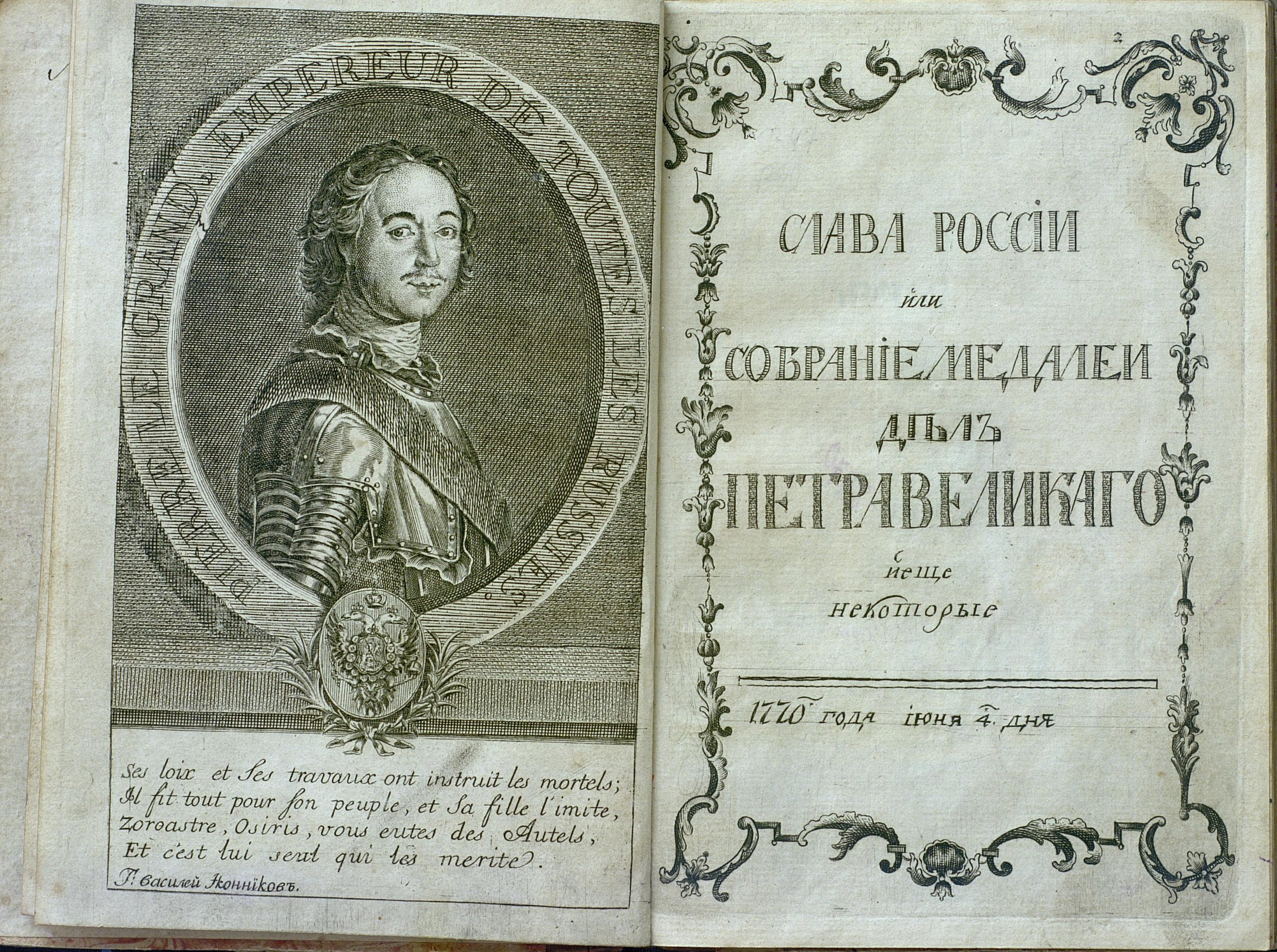
A catalog of medals published by private collector Fyodor Dmitriyev-Mamonov in 1770 under the title "The Glory of Russia or a Collection of Medals of Peter the Great and Others".

Slava Rossii (Russian: Слава России) translates from Russian as "Glory of Russia", "Fame of Russia" or "Glory to Russia". The meaning and grammatical case used in the original Russian text can be understood from the context.

- Glory of Russia Cape (originally Russian: мыс Славы России, romanized: mys Slavy Rossii), the northernmost point of St. Matthew Island in the Bering Sea in the US state of Alaska
- Slavarassi, Slavorossiya or New Russia, a trading-post for furs and a penal colony established by Russians in 1796 in present-day Yakutat Borough, Alaska, United States
- Slava Rossii-class (59 units), ships of the line of Russia
  - Slava Rossii (1733), a ship
  - Slava Rossii (1774), a ship
  - Slava Rossii (1789), a ship
- Slava Rossii (1785–94 expedition), a Russian expedition commanded by the British Captain Joseph Billings, astronomer on Cook's third voyage.
- Slava Rossii, a traditional slogan and greeting used by a number of nationalist organizations and movements such as the Russian Fascist Party, Russian National Unity, the Rodina Party, the Slavic Union, Russian March and the Popular Resistance Association
- Slava Rossii, a demo recording of 1995 by the band Kolovrat
- Slava Rossii, an album of 2007 by the band Pilgrim
- Slava Rossii, a rock festival
- Slava Rossii, a military song and dance ensemble

== See also ==
- Slava
- Slava Rusi ("Glory to Rus'"), a nationalist slogan and greeting (more related to an ethnic nationalism)
- Slava Ukraini

=== Russian melodies ===
- Slav'sya (be glorious)
- Preobrazhensky Regiment March
- With cognate words used in the original Russian text of previous Russian anthems
  - "Glory to Russia!", proposed lyrics for the 1990 Russian national anthem
  - Let the Thunder of Victory Rumble!
  - How Glorious Is Our Lord in Zion
  - The Prayer of Russians
  - God Save the Tsar!
  - Anthem of Free Russia
