= Zhirkov =

Zhirkov (Russian: Жирков) is a Russian masculine surname, its feminine counterpart is Zhirkova. Notable people with the surname include:

- Elizaveta Ivanovna Zhirkova, birth name of Elisheva Bikhovski (1888–1949), Russian and Israeli poet, writer, literary critic and translator
- Lev Zhirkov, Soviet and Russian philologist
- Tatyana Zhyrkova (born 1968), Russian athlete
- Yuri Zhirkov (born 1983), Russian football player, brother of Nikolai
