= God, the Omnipotent! =

- Genre: Hymn
- Written: 1842
- Text: Henry F. Chorley
- Based on: Revelation 19:6
- Meter: 11.10.11.9
- Melody: "Russian Hymn" by Alexei Lvov

"God, the Omnipotent!" also known as "God, the All-terrible!" is a hymn with words written in 1842 by Henry F. Chorley (1808–1872) and 3rd and 4th stanzas by John Ellerton (1826–1893) in 1870. It is based on a text from Revelation 19:6, "The Lord God omnipotent reigneth" (KJV). Set in 11.10.11.9 meter, the tune is from the 19th century Russian national anthem, God Save The Tsar!, composed by Alexei Lvov (1798–1870) in 1833.

The original form appears to be the "All-terrible", but from the early 20 century the "Omnipotent" versions seems to have become more popular. The "All-terrible" form was retained when the [British] Methodist Hymn-Book was published in 1933.

The hymn is quoted in Mark Twain's short story The War Prayer

The tune name is Russian Hymn in various modern hymnals, such as those of the United Methodist Church and the Presbyterian Church (U.S.A.), or just Russia, as in The Hymnal 1982 of the Episcopal Church in the United States of America. Called "stirring" by one hymn editor, the hymn is described as having "a triumphant, positive quality". The lyrics are as follows:

"Omnipotent" form

God the Omnipotent! King, who ordainest
Thunder Thy clarion, the lightning Thy sword;
Show forth Thy pity on high where Thou reignest;
Give to us peace in our time, O Lord.

God the All-merciful! earth hath forsaken
Meekness and mercy, and slighted Thy Word;
Let not Thy wrath in its terrors awaken;
Give to us peace in our time, O Lord.

God the All-righteous One! Man hath defied Thee
Yet to eternity standeth Thy word
Falsehood and wrong shall not tarry beside Thee
Give to us peace in our time, O Lord.

God the All-provident! Earth by Thy chastening
Yet shall to freedom and truth be restored
Through the thick darkness Thy Kingdom is hastening
Thou wilt give peace in Thy time, O Lord."

"All-terrible" form

God the All-terrible! King, who ordainest
Great winds Thy clarions, the lightnings Thy sword;
Show forth Thy pity on high where Thou reignest;
Give to us peace in our time, O Lord.

God the All-merciful! Earth hath forsaken
Thy way of blessedness, slighted Thy word,
Bid not Thy wrath in its terrors awaken;
Give to us peace in our time, O Lord.

God the All-righteous One! Man hath defied Thee;
Yet to eternity standeth Thy word;
Falsehood and wrong shall not tarry beside Thee;
Give to us peace in our time, O Lord.

God the All-wise! By the fire of Thy chastening,
Earth shall to freedom and truth be restored;
Through the thick darkness Thy kingdom is hastening;
Thou wilt give peace in Thy time, O Lord.

So shall Thy children in thankful devotion
Laud Him who saved them from peril abhorred,
Singing in chorus from ocean to ocean:
Peace to the nations and praise to the Lord.

In 1982, new words to the Russian Hymn tune were composed by Carl P. Daw Jr., entitled Christ the Victorious, for the U.S. Episcopal Church's The Hymnal 1982. Both versions, God, the Omnipotent! and Christ the Victorious, appear in The Hymnal 1982.
