= How Glorious Is Our Lord in Zion =

1794 Russian hymn and former anthem

Коль славен наш Господь в Сионе
English: "How Glorious Is Our Lord in Zion"
- Sheet music printed in early 20th century
- Former national anthem of Russia
- Lyrics: Mikhail Kheraskov
- Music: Dmitry Bortniansky
- Adopted: 1794
- Readopted: 1918
- Relinquished: 1816
- Preceded by: "Let the Thunder of Victory Rumble!" (1791) "The Internationale" (1918)
- Succeeded by: "The Prayer of Russians" (1816) "The Internationale" (1920)

Audio sample
- How Glorious Is Our Lord in Zion: file; help

"How Glorious Is Our Lord in Zion" (Note: Russian: Коль славен наш Господь в Сионе, romanized: Kol slaven nash Gospod v Sione, IPA: [kolʲ ˈslavʲɪn naʐ‿ɡɐˈspotʲ f‿sʲɪˈonʲɪ]) is a hymn written in the spring of 1794 by the composer Dmitry Bortniansky to the verses of the poet Mikhail Kheraskov. It was the unofficial anthem of the Russian Empire between the late 18th and early 19th centuries.

The first public performance took place on 29 November 1798 during the ceremony of laying on the Russian Emperor Paul I the crown and other regalia of the Grand Master of the Order of St. John in the Winter Palace, and since 1801 the anthem actually supplanted the previously performed "Let the Thunder of Victory Rumble!". In 1816 it was replaced by the officially approved composition "The Prayer of Russians". From 1856 to October 1917, the chimes of the Spasskaya Tower in the Moscow Kremlin rang out the melody of the anthem. Also, before the October Revolution, it was performed by the chimes of the Peter and Paul Cathedral, and in 2003 it was restored in honor of the celebration of the anniversary of Saint Petersburg. In 1918–1920, "How glorious" was the anthem of the Russian State, and later continued to be popular among the first wave of emigrants. During the Great Patriotic War, it was performed at the official meetings of the KONR, in fact it was the anthem of the ROA. In the modern Russian Federation, it is performed in military ceremonies when honoring - at the opening of monuments, farewell to servicemen and at burial.

The text of the hymn is based on the 48th Psalm and is replete with Christian symbolism, and its music is close to individual Voices of the Great Znamenny Chant.

The melody of the anthem was used in a German song to the lyrics Ich bete an die Macht der Liebe ("I pray to the power of love") by Gerhard Tersteegen. Also, the music of the anthem was used by the composer G. Beck when writing the anthem of the Jewish Socialist Party Bund "Di Shvue".

== Lyrics ==
Original Russian orthography

Коль славенъ нашъ Господь въ Сіонѣ,
Не можетъ изъяснить языкъ.
Великъ Онъ въ Небесахъ на тронѣ,
Въ былинкахъ на землѣ великъ.
Вездѣ, Господь, вездѣ Ты славенъ,
Въ нощи, во дни Сіяньемъ равенъ.

Тебя Твой Агнецъ златорунной
Въ себе изображаетъ намъ;
Псалтырью мы десятострунной
Тебѣ приносимъ ѳиміамъ.
Прими отъ насъ благодаренье,
Какъ благовонное куренье.

Ты солнцемъ смертныхъ освѣщаешь,
Ты любишь, Боже, насъ какъ чадъ,
Ты насъ трапезой насыщаешь
И зиждешь намъ въ Сiонѣ градъ.
Ты грѣшныхъ, Боже, посѣщаешь
И плотiю Твоей питаешь.

О Боже, во Твое селенье
Да внидутъ наши голоса,
Да взыдетъ наше умиленье,
Къ Тебѣ, какъ утрення роса!
Тебѣ въ сердцахъ алтарь поставимъ,
Тебя, Господь, поемъ и славимъ!

Modern orthography

Коль славен наш Господь в Сионе,
Не может изъяснить язык.
Велик Он в небесах на троне,
В былинках на земле велик.
Везде, Господь, везде Ты славен,
В нощи, во дни сияньем равен.

Тебя Твой агнец златорунный
В себе изображает нам;
Псалтырью мы десятиструнной
Тебе приносим фимиам.
Прими от нас благодаренье,
Как благовонное куренье.

Ты солнцем смертных освещаешь,
Ты любишь, Боже, нас как чад,
Ты нас трапезой насыщаешь
И зиждешь нам в Сионе град.
Ты грешных, Боже, посещаешь
И плотию Твоей питаешь.

О Боже, во Твоё селенье
Да внидут наши голоса,
И взыдет наше умиленье,
К Тебе, как утрення роса!
Тебе в сердцах алтарь поставим,
Тебе, Господь, поём и славим!

Russian Latin alphabet

Kol slaven nash Gospod v Sione,
Ne mozhet izyasnit' yazyk.
Velik On v Nebesakh na trone,
V bylinkakh na zemle velik.
Vezde, Gospod', vezde Ty slaven,
V noshchi, vo dni Siyan'yem raven.

Tebya Tvoy Agnets zlatorunnoy
V sebe izobrazhayet nam;
Psaltyr'yu my desyatostrunnoy
Tebe prinosim fimiam.
Primi ot nas blagodaren'ye,
Kak blagovonnoye kuren'ye.

Ty solntsem smertnykh osveshchayesh',
Ty lyubish', Bozhe, nas kak chad,
Ty nas trapezoy nasyshchayesh'
I zizhdesh' nam v Sione grad.
Ty greshnykh, Bozhe, poseshchayesh'
I plotiyu Tvoyey pitayesh'.

O Bozhe, vo Tvoye selenye
Da vnidut nashi golosa,
I vzydet nashe umilen'ye,
K Tebe, kak utrennya rosa!
Tebe v serdtsakh altar' postavim,
Tebe, Gospod', poyem i slavim!

English translation

How glorious our Lord is on Zion,
The tongue can not express.
He’s great in Heavens on the throne,
In blades of grass on earth He is great.
Oh Lord, Thou art Glorious everywhere,
At night, by day Thy shining is the same.

Thy lamb with golden fleece
Symbolizes Thee for us;
With ten-strings psaltery
We burn incense for Thee.
Accept our thanksgiving
As a fragrant offering.

Thou illume mortals by the sun,
Thou love us, God, as your children,
Thou satiate us with blessed meal
And create for us a city on Zion.
Thou, oh God, visit the sinners
And nourish them with Thy flesh.

Oh God, let our voices
Enter Thy dwelling,
And let our tender sense
Rise to Thee like morning dew!
For Thee with heart we’ll raise an altar,
For Thee we sing and glorifying!
