= John Rutter Chorley =

English author, bibliophile, and Hispanist

John Rutter Chorley (31 July 1806, Blackley Hurst, Lancashire – 29 June 1867, London) was an English author, bibliophile, and Hispanist (also interested in other Romance studies).

== Life ==
Born in Blackley Hurst near Billinge, Merseyside, John Rutter Chorley was the older brother of the author and critic Henry Fothergill Chorley (1808–1872). In addition to his career in railway administration as corporate secretary to the Grand Junction Railway between Liverpool and Birmingham, he worked as a private tutor. In 1845 a bequest from his uncle made him independently wealthy and he retired and moved to London. With help from George Ticknor, Cayetano Alberto de la Barrera (1815–1872) and experts at the British Museum, Chorley became a significant collector as a bibliophile.

He devoted himself especially to the Spanish drama, and formed a superb collection of plays, which he partly gave, partly bequeathed, to the British Museum. The enumeration of his manuscript notes in separate dramas occupies between six and seven columns of the museum printed catalogue. Many of these plays were restored by himself out of a number of mutilated copies, and missing title-pages were imitated with most deceptive skill.he accumulated an important collected plays of Spanish theatre, which he translated and edited with learned remarks and so became a pioneer of British Hispanic studies.

From 1832–1846 he wrote primarily for Tait's Edinburgh Magazine, reviewing German, Italian, English, French and Spanish literature (29 contributions attributed). From 1834 onwards he also wrote occasionally for the Athenaeum, where he became principal reviewer of German, Italian and Spanish publications (1846–1854). By the late 1840s Chorley counted as an authority on Spanish Golden Age drama.

Among his friends was Thomas Carlyle.

== Selected works ==
- "Notes on the National Drama of Spain. Chapter I. Introductory". Fraser's Magazine. 59: 543–557. May 1859.
- "Notes on the National Drama of Spain. Chapter II. Outlines". Fraser's Magazine. 60: 49–71. July 1859.
- "Notes on the National Drama of Spain. Chapter III. Principles". Fraser's Magazine. 60: 314–330. September 1859.
- "Notes on the National Drama of Spain. Chapter III (concluded)". Fraser's Magazine. 60: 423–434. October 1859.
- with Cayetano Alberto de la Barrera y Leirado: Catálogo bibliográfico y biográfico del teatro antiguo Español, desde sus origenes hasta mediados del siglo XVIII. Madrid 1860
- Catálogo de comedias y autos de Frey Lope Félix de Vega Carpio, compuesta en lengua castellana. Corregido y adicionado por Cayetano Alberto de la Barrera. In: Comedias escogidas de Frey Lope Félix de Vega Carpio, 4, 1860, S. 535–558 und Madrid 1861
- The wife’s litany. A winter-night’s dream. Ballads and other pieces in verse. London 1865

== Sources ==
- Catalogue of the Select Library of the late John Rutter Chorley comprising works on English, French, German, Italian and Spanish Romance literature which will be sold on Wednesday, November 27, 1867
- Hugo Albert Rennert: Bibliography of the dramatic works of Lope de Vega Carpio based upon the catalogue of John Rutter Chorley. New York / Paris 1915
- John Callan James Metford: An early Liverpool Hispanist: John Rutter Chorley. In: Bulletin of Spanish Studies, 25, 100, 1948, pp. 247–259
