= Pennsylvania (song) =

State Song of Pennsylvania US State

- Regional anthem of Pennsylvania
- Lyrics: Eddie Khoury and Ronnie Bonner, 1955
- Music: Eddie Khoury and Ronnie Bonner, 1961
- Adopted: November 29, 1990; 34 years ago
- Preceded by: "Hail, Pennsylvania!"

Audio sample
- "Pennsylvania" (instrumental, one verse): file; help

"Pennsylvania" (Pennsylvania German: Pennsylvanie) is the regional anthem of the U.S. state of the same name.

== History ==
The song was written and composed by former prison administrator Eddie Khoury and Ronnie Bonner, and serves as the official state song for all public purposes. State Representative Frank L. Oliver introduced the bill for the song, and it was adopted by the Pennsylvanian General Assembly and signed into law by Governor Robert P. Casey on November 29, 1990. It replaced "Hail, Pennsylvania!".

== Lyrics ==
Pennsylvania, Pennsylvania,
Mighty is your name,
Steeped in glory and tradition,
Object of acclaim.
Where brave men fought the foe of freedom,
Tyranny decried,
Til the bell of independence
filled the countryside.

Chorus

Pennsylvania, Pennsylvania,
May your future be,
filled with honor everlasting
as your history.

Pennsylvania, Pennsylvania,
Blessed by God's own hand,
Birthplace of a mighty nation,
Keystone of the land.
Where first our country's flag unfolded,
Freedom to proclaim,
May the voices of tomorrow
glorify your name.

Chorus

Pennsylvania, Pennsylvania,
May your future be,
filled with honor everlasting
as your history.
