= Hail, Pennsylvania! =

Song written by Edgar M. Dilley

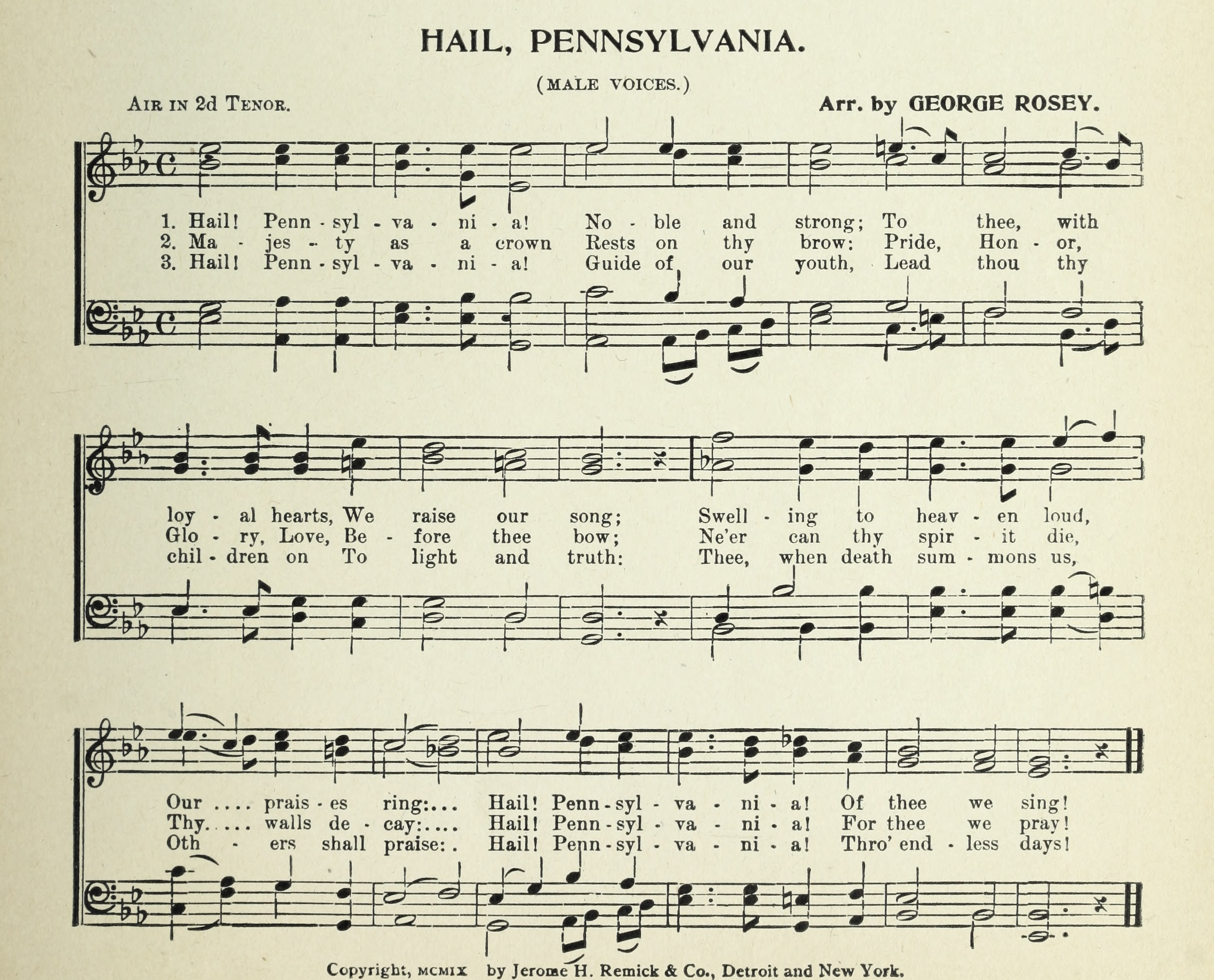
- 1909 sheet music
- Former regional anthem of Pennsylvania Municipal anthem of Scranton, Pennsylvania
- Lyrics: Edgar M. Dilley, 1894
- Music: Alexei Fyodorovich Lvov
- Adopted: 1895 (by Pennsylvania)
- Relinquished: 1990 (by Pennsylvania)
- Succeeded by: "Pennsylvania" (by Pennsylvania)

"Hail, Pennsylvania!" (Pennsylvania German: Haagel, Pennsylvanie!) is a song written by Edgar M. Dilley (Class of 1897) as a submission to a University of Pennsylvania alumni committee-sponsored contest to write a song to the tune of "God Save the Tsar!", the national anthem of Imperial Russia, by Alexei Fyodorovich Lvov. Dilley was awarded $25 for creating it. It served as the state song of Pennsylvania until 1990 and now serves as the municipal anthem of Scranton, Pennsylvania.

== History ==
Dilley was an assistant director with the University of Pennsylvania Glee Club at the University of Pennsylvania in Philadelphia. The piece was first performed by his group at its annual concert at the Academy of Music in 1895. For many years, the song was performed at Franklin Field, when the football team suffered a loss. The song is presently performed at University functions and sporting events by the University of Pennsylvania Band and The University of Pennsylvania Glee Club.

Aside from becoming the alma mater of the University of Pennsylvania, the song also serves as the official song of Lackawanna County. Also, until 1990, the song served as the official song for the Commonwealth of Pennsylvania.

== Lyrics ==
Hail! Pennsylvania!
Noble and strong;
To thee with loyal hearts,
We raise our song.
Swelling to Heaven loud,
Our praises ring;
Hail! Pennsylvania,
Of thee we sing!

Majesty as a crown
Rests on thy brow;
Pride, Honor, Glory, Love,
Before thee bow.
Ne'er can thy spirit die,
Thy walls decay;
Hail! Pennsylvania,
For thee we pray!

Hail! Pennsylvania!
Guide of our youth;
Lead thou thy children on
To light and truth;
Thee, when death summons us,
Others shall praise,
Hail! Pennsylvania,
Thro' endless days!
