= Let the Thunder of Victory Rumble! (anthem) =

Former unofficial Russian anthem (1791–1833)

Grom pobedy, razdavaysya!
English: "Let the Thunder of Victory Rumble!"
- Гром победы, раздавайся!
- Former de facto anthem of Russia
- Lyrics: Gavrila Derzhavin, 1791
- Music: Józef Kozłowski, 1791
- Adopted: 1791
- Relinquished: 1816
- Succeeded by: "How Glorious Is Our Lord in Zion"

Audio sample
- Vocal recording: file; help

Instrumental recording

"Let the Thunder of Victory Rumble!" (Note: Russian: Гром победы, раздавайся!, romanized: Grom pobedy, razdavaysya!, IPA: [ɡrom pɐˈbʲedɨ rəzdɐˈvajsʲə]) was a de facto national anthem of the Russian Empire in the late 18th and early 19th century.

The lyrics were written by the premier Russian poet of the time, Gavrila Derzhavin, and the music by composer Józef Kozłowski, in 1791. The song was written to commemorate the capture of major Ottoman fortress Izmail by the great Russian general Aleksandr Suvorov. This event effectively ended the Seventh Russo-Turkish War.

The tune is a polonaise.

This anthem was eventually replaced by a formal imperial anthem, "God Save the Tsar!", which was adopted in 1833.

== Lyrics ==
Original Russian orthography

Громъ побѣды, раздавайся!
Весѣлися, храбрый Россъ!
𝄆 Звучной славой украшайся. 𝄇
𝄆 Магомета ты потресъ! 𝄇

Припев:
𝄆 Славься симъ, Екатерина! 𝄇
𝄆 Славься, нѣжная къ намъ мать! 𝄇
Славься симъ, Екатерина!
Славься, нѣжная къ намъ мать!

Воды быстрыя Дуная
𝄆 Ужъ въ рукахъ теперь у насъ; 𝄇
𝄆 Храбрость Россовъ почитая, 𝄇
Тавръ подъ нами и Кавказъ.

Ужъ не могутъ орды Крыма
Нынѣ рушить нашъ покой;
𝄆 Гордость низится Селима, 𝄇
𝄆 И блѣднѣетъ онъ съ луной. 𝄇

Припев

Стонъ Синила раздается,
𝄆 Днесь въ подсолнечной вездѣ, 𝄇
𝄆 Зависть и вражда мятется 𝄇
И терзается въ себѣ.

Мы ликуемъ славы звуки,
Чтобъ враги могли узрѣть,
𝄆 Что свои готовы руки 𝄇
𝄆 Въ край вселенной мы прострѣть. 𝄇

Припев

Зри, премудрая царица!
𝄆 Зри, великая жена! 𝄇
𝄆 Что Твой взглядъ, Твоя десница 𝄇
Нашъ законъ, душа одна.

Зри на блещущи соборы,
Зри на сей прекрасный строй;
𝄆 Всѣхъ сердца Тобой и взоры 𝄇
𝄆 Оживляются одной. 𝄇

Припев

Reformed orthography

Гром победы, раздавайся!
Веселися, храбрый Росс!
𝄆 Звучной славой украшайся. 𝄇
𝄆 Магомета ты потрёс! 𝄇

Припев:
𝄆 Славься сим, Екатерина! 𝄇
𝄆 Славься, нежная к нам мать! 𝄇
Славься сим, Екатерина!
Славься, нежная к нам мать!

Воды быстрые Дуная
𝄆 Уж в руках теперь у нас; 𝄇
𝄆 Храбрость Россов почитая, 𝄇
Тавр под нами и Кавказ.

Уж не могут орды Крыма
Ныне рушить наш покой;
𝄆 Гордость низится Селима, 𝄇
𝄆 И бледнеет он с луной. 𝄇

Припев

Стон Синая раздаётся,
𝄆 Днесь в подсолнечной везде, 𝄇
𝄆 Зависть и вражда мятется 𝄇
И терзается в себе.

Мы ликуем славы звуки,
Чтоб враги могли узреть,
𝄆 Что свои готовы руки 𝄇
𝄆 В край вселенной мы простреть. 𝄇

Припев

Зри, премудрая царица!
𝄆 Зри, великая жена! 𝄇
𝄆 Что Твой взгляд, Твоя десница 𝄇
Наш закон, душа одна.

Зри на блещущи соборы,
Зри на сей прекрасный строй;
𝄆 Всех сердца Тобой и взоры 𝄇
𝄆 Оживляются одной. 𝄇

Припев

Russian Latin alphabet

Grom pobedy, razdavaysya!
Veselisya, khrabryy Ross!
𝄆 Zvuchnoy slavoy ukrashaysya. 𝄇
𝄆 Magometa ty potryos! 𝄇

Pripev:
𝄆 Slav'sya sim, Yekaterina! 𝄇
𝄆 Slav'sya, nezhnaya k nam mat'! 𝄇
Slav'sya sim, Yekaterina!
Slav'sya, nezhnaya k nam mat'!

Vody bystryye Dunaya
𝄆 Uzh v rukakh teper' u nas; 𝄇
𝄆 Khrabrost' Rossov pochitaya, 𝄇
Tavr pod nami i Kavkaz.

Uzh ne mogut ordy Kryma
Nyne rushit' nash pokoy;
𝄆 Gordost' nizitsya Selima, 𝄇
𝄆 I bledneyet on s lunoy. 𝄇

Pripev

Ston Sinaya razdayotsya,
𝄆 Dnes' v podsolnechnoy vezde, 𝄇
𝄆 Zavist' i vrazhda myatetsya 𝄇
I terzayetsya v sebe.

My likuyem slavy zvuki,
Chtob vragi mogli uzret',
𝄆 Chto svoi gotovy ruki 𝄇
𝄆 V kray vselennoy my prostret'. 𝄇

Pripev

Zri, premudraya tsaritsa!
𝄆 Zri, velikaya zhena! 𝄇
𝄆 Chto Tvoy vzglyad, Tvoya desnitsa 𝄇
Nash zakon, dusha odna.

Zri na bleshchushchi sobory,
Zri na sey prekrasnyy stroy;
𝄆 Vsekh serdtsa Toboy i vzory 𝄇
𝄆 Ozgivlyayutsya odnoy. 𝄇

Pripev

English translation
(by Alexander F. Beck)

Triumph's thunder louder, higher!
Russian pride is running high!
𝄆 Russia's glory sparkles brighter! 𝄇
𝄆 We have humbled Muslim might. 𝄇

Chorus:
𝄆 Hail to you for this, oh Catherine! 𝄇
𝄆 Gentle mother to us all! 𝄇
Hail to you for this, oh Catherine!
Gentle mother to us all!

Danube's swiftly flowing waters
𝄆 Are at last in our firm hands; 𝄇
𝄆 Caucasus respects our prowess, 𝄇
Russia rules Crimean lands.

Turkish-Tatar hordes no longer
May disturb our calm domain.
𝄆 Proud Selim won't be the stronger 𝄇
𝄆 evermore, as Crescent wanes. 𝄇

Chorus

Groans by Ishmael repeated
𝄆 'Round the world are heard perforce. 𝄇
𝄆 Envy, enmity — defeated! — 𝄇
Turn to poison at the source.

Make the most of every triumph —
For our foes it's time to see:
𝄆 Russia reaches farther-higher 𝄇
𝄆 Over mountain peaks and seas. 𝄇

Chorus

Brilliant Empress, gaze at visions,
𝄆 And behold, a woman great: 𝄇
𝄆 In your thoughts and your decisions 𝄇
As one soul we all partake.

Look at grand cathedrals' splendor,
Contemplate our strength and grace;
𝄆 See your subjects' hearts surrender 𝄇
𝄆 To rejoice before your face! 𝄇

Chorus

== See also ==
- Let the Thunder of Victory Rumble!, a novel by Russo-Georgian writer Boris Akunin
