= Henry Chorley =

English literary, art and music critic, writer and editor (1808–1872)

Drawing of Chorley, 1841

Henry Fothergill Chorley (15 December 1808 – 16 February 1872) was an English literary, painting and music critic, writer and editor. He was also an author of novels, drama, poetry and lyrics.

Chorley was a prolific and important music and literary critic and music gossip columnist of the mid-nineteenth century and wrote extensively about music in London and in Europe. His opera libretti and works of fiction were far less successful. He is perhaps best remembered today for his lyrics to "The Long Day Closes", a part song set by Arthur Sullivan in 1868.

== Life and career ==
Chorley was born in Blackley Hurst, near Billinge, Lancashire, England. Chorley was the youngest of four children of Quaker parents, John Chorley (1771–1816), an iron worker and lock maker, and Jane Chorley, née Wilkinson (1779–1851). Chorley's father died, leaving his mother alone with young children. Jane Chorley moved her family to Liverpool to help take care of her half-brother, Dr Rutter, when he became ill. Chorley was educated by private tutors in Liverpool and then the school of the Royal Institution. His youth was shaped partly by spending time in the household of the wealthy and intellectual Mrs Benson Rathbone of Green Bank, and he became a close friend of her son Benson, who died in an accident in 1834.

=== Journalism and non-fiction works ===
He began working in merchants' offices, hoping to become a musician, but his uncle discouraged that as an impractical ambition. However, Chorley soon took to musical and literary criticism. He began to write for the Athenaeum in 1830 and remained its music and literature critic until 1868. While there, he reviewed approximately 2,500 books and wrote reviews and musical gossip columns discussing composers and performers in Britain and on the European continent. In this position, he had much influence. He had strongly conservative views and was a persistent opponent of innovation, but was a lively chronicler of London life. In 1850 and 1851, Chorley edited the Ladies' Companion, which covered fashion and domestic women's issues. In the Athenaeum and elsewhere, Chorley often criticised the music of Schumann and Wagner for what he called "decadence".

In addition to criticism for journals, Chorley wrote voluminously on literature and art. His non-fiction books were widely read and included Music and Manners in France and Germany (1841), which includes a detailed description of contemporary opera in Paris and Felix Mendelssohn's career in Leipzig, Germany. He expanded the German section of this book and published it 1854 as Modern German Music. His masterpiece was Thirty Years' Musical Recollections (1862), which covers, year-by-year, the opera seasons of European operas in London between 1830 and 1859. In the work, he blames the autocratic manager of Her Majesty's Theatre, Benjamin Lumley, for a decline in the quality of performances there. On the other hand, he praises the efforts of Giulia Grisi, Mario and Michael Costa, together with a group of journalists (including himself), for successfully creating the Royal Italian Opera at Covent Garden in 1847. He also wrote the well-received Memorials of Mrs. Hemans (1836), Handel Studies (1859), an annotated edition Mary Russell Mitford's letters (2 vols., 1872) and The National Music of the World (1882).

=== Fiction and playwriting ===
Chorley also wrote, with far less success, novels, stories, drama and verse, and various librettos. His works of fiction included Sketches of a Seaport Town (1834), a collection of stories, essays, and novellas related to Liverpool. The next year, he wrote Conti the Discarded. Neither of these achieved success. His plays, Old Love and New Fortune (1850) and Duchess Eleanour (1854), did not gain a following. He wrote two novels, Roccabella (1859), under the pseudonym Paul Bell and dedicated to Elizabeth Barrett Browning, and A Prodigy: a Tale of Music (1866). His libretti included The Amber Witch for composer William Vincent Wallace, The May Queen – A Pastoral (1858) for William Sterndale Bennett, and two for his friend Arthur Sullivan: The Sapphire Necklace and The Masque at Kenilworth. He published an English version of Meyerbeer's Dinorah, and wrote the words for several well-known songs, including Gounod's "Nazareth", Edward Loder's "The Brave Old Oak" and "The Three Ages", the English form of the Bach-Gounod "Ave Maria", Sullivan's "The Long Day Closes", and the hymn "God, the Omnipotent!".

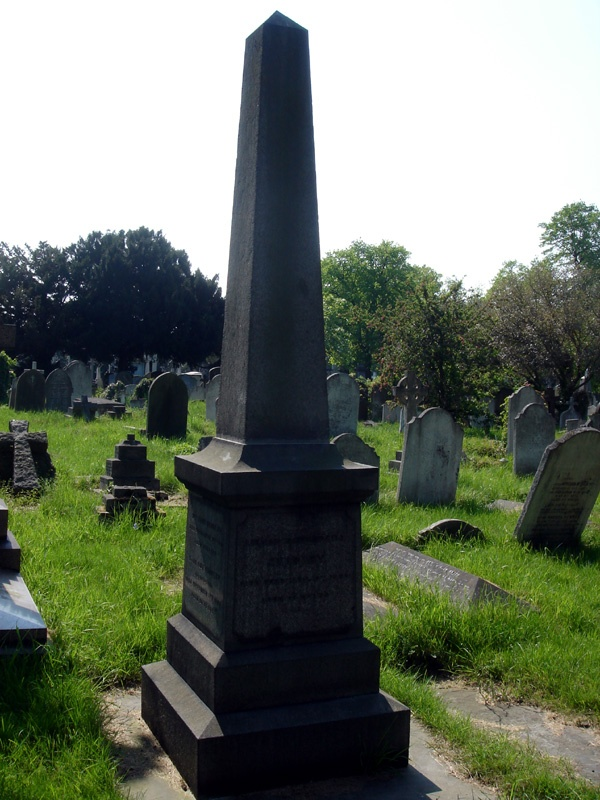
Funerary monument, Brompton Cemetery, London

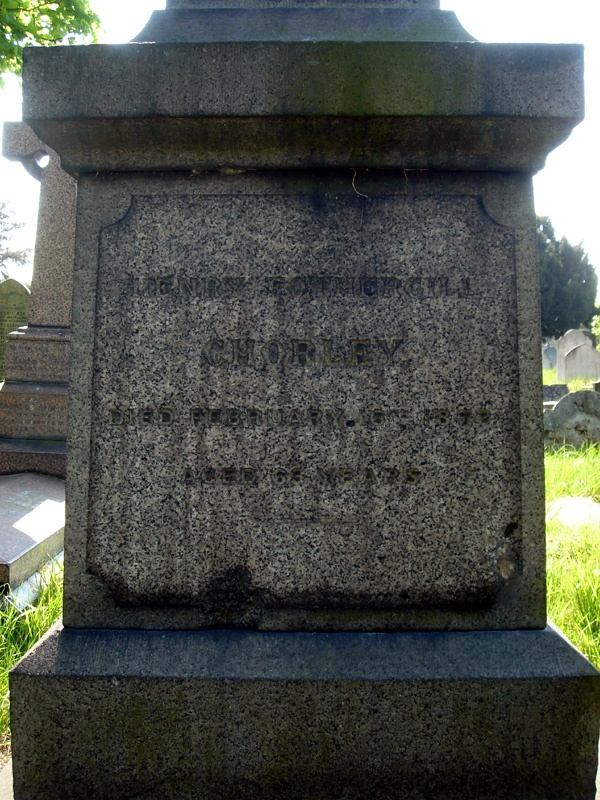
Detail of monument

Chorley wrote the English libretto for Gounod's Faust, for its first presentation in London in 1863 (at Her Majesty's Theatre). During rehearsals, it was found that the lines were unsingable. Both Sims Reeves and Charles Santley made strenuous and persistent complaints to Messrs. Chappell's, and new translations were made secretly, since no-one dared to tell Chorley. The first he knew of it was at the first performance. Chorley, as reviewer, waited to make his comment until the final announced performance, of which he wrote that it was "seriously imperilled by a singular translation". Unfortunately for him, the final performance in question had not taken place, so the Musical World was able to compliment him on his poetic imagination. Nevertheless, Chorley's translations of several songs from Faust were published and widely performed, such as "The Flower Song", "When All Was Young" and "Glory and Love". A similar Chorley effort, albeit of an obscure work, fared better: his translation of Mendelssohn's Die Heimkehr aus der Fremde, which Chorley rendered as "Son and Stranger," for the work's London premiere in 1851 is still heard today in that work's rare revivals.

=== Personality and last years ===
Chorley was considered eccentric and abrasive, but he was respected for his integrity and kindness. Chorley enthusiastically gave and attended dinner parties and was known as a big drinker. He cultivated friendships with Elizabeth Barrett Browning and Mendelssohn, and later Charles Dickens, Arthur Sullivan and Charles Santley, among others. After the death of his brother, John Rutter Chorley (1806–1867), he inherited enough money to retire from the Athenaeum, although he continued to contribute articles for that paper and also for The Orchestra.

In spite of his efforts to promote the music of Charles Gounod in England, the composer disliked Chorley intensely. When Gounod lived in England during the early 1870s, he wrote a satirical character piece for piano that was intended to be a parody of Chorley's personality. It greatly amused Gounod's English patron, Georgina Weldon, who described Chorley as having a "thin, sour, high-pitched sopranish voice" and moving like a "stuffed red-haired monkey." Gounod intended to publish the piece with a dedication to Chorley, but the latter died before this was possible. Weldon then invented a new programme for the piece, which was re-titled Funeral March of a Marionette. It became popular as a concert piece, and in the 1950s, its opening phrases became well known as the theme music for the television program Alfred Hitchcock Presents.

Chorley died at his home in London in 1872, at the age of 63, and is buried there in Brompton Cemetery. He left a very considerable estate of £45,000. One bequest was to the Royal National Lifeboat Institution (RNLI), which in 1872 funded the lifeboat John Rutter Chorley, placed at Drogheda No.2 Lifeboat Station on the River Boyne in Ireland. From 1872 to 1885, the lifeboat was launched 18 times and saved 38 lives.

Fellow critic Charles Lewis Gruneisen wrote in the Athenaeum that Chorley's personality had impeded appreciation of his qualities.

== Bibliography ==
- Chorley, Henry Fothergill. (1862). Thirty Years' Musical Recollections. Hurst and Blackett (reissued by Cambridge University Press, 2009; ISBN 978-1-108-00139-7)
- Chorley, Henry Fothergill. (1841). Music and Manners in France and Germany. Longmans, Orme, Brown, Green and Longmans (reissued by Cambridge University Press, 2009; ISBN 978-1-108-00203-5)
- Chorley, Henry Fothergill. (1854). Modern German Music. Smith, Elder (reissued by Cambridge University Press, 2009; ISBN 978-1-108-00158-8)
- Chorley, Henry Fothergill. (1880, posthumously published). The National Music of the World. Low, Marston (reissued by Cambridge University Press, 2009; ISBN 978-1-108-00138-0)
- Chorley, Henry Fothergill. Autobiography, Memoir and Letters, edited by H. G. Hewlett, 2 vols. (1873).
- Chorley, Henry Fothergill. Thirty Years' Musical Recollections (Hurst and Blackett, 1862). Available online here
