= Russian Latin alphabet =

Unofficial writing system for Russian

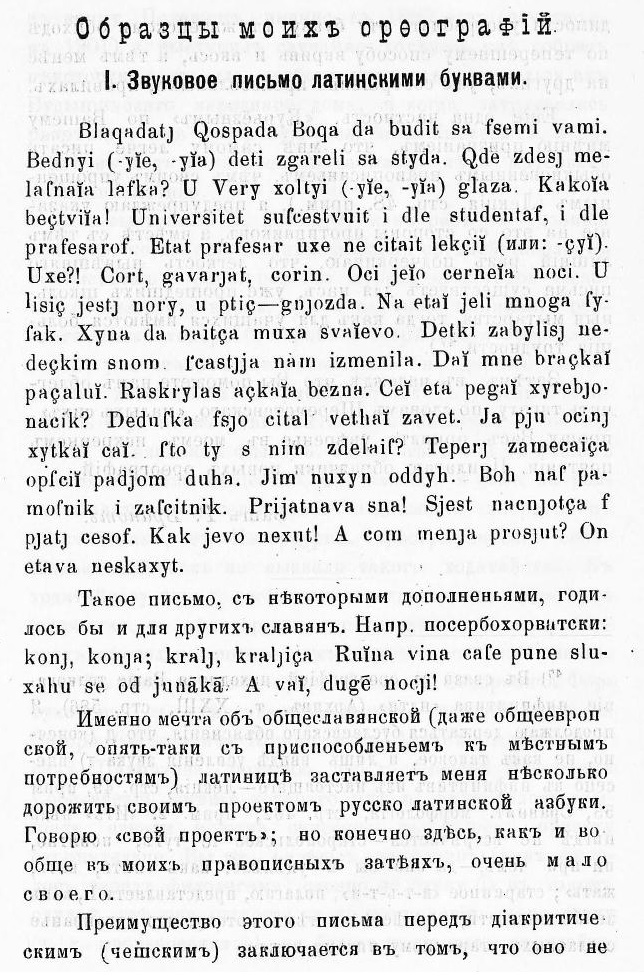
A page from Brandt R.F.’s Mneniya o russkom pravopisanii in the Russian Latin alphabet

The Russian Latin alphabet is the common name for various variants of writing the Russian language by means of the Latin alphabet.

== History ==
=== Latin in East Slavic languages ===
The first cases of using Latin to write East Slavic languages were found in the documents of the Grand Duchy of Lithuania and the Commonwealth in the 16th–18th centuries. These recordings were typically made in Ruthenian, written essentially following the rules of Polish orthography. In the 17th century in the Moscow region it became fashionable to make short notes in Russian in the letters of the Latin alphabet. This practice was especially widespread in the 1680s and 1690s.

Known records of the Russian language by foreign travelers include a French dictionary-phrasebook of the 16th century in the Latin alphabet and a dictionary-diary of Richard James, mostly in Latin graphics (influenced by the orthography of various Western European languages), but interspersed with letters of the Greek and Russian alphabets.

In the 19th century and the first half of the 20th, the Polish Latin alphabet was used to convey the Belarusian language, see Belarusian Latin alphabet. The Belarusian language then moved to the phonetic system of orthography. In 1900, cz, sz and ż began to be replaced by č, š and ž. Because the new letters were used by the newspaper Naša Niwa, Latin was sometimes called "the Naša Niwa version". The previous version Latin was sometimes called "the Great Lithuanian version".

For the Ukrainian language in the nineteenth century, there were two versions of Latin: "Polonized" by Josyp Łozynski in 1834 ("alphabet") and "Czechized" by the Czech Slavist Josef Jireček in 1859.

=== Some projects of the 19th century ===
In 1833, a brochure by an unknown author appeared in Moscow: "New improved letters of the Russian alphabet" or "Орыt wedenія novыh russkih liter" (Essay on introduction of new Russian letters). In it, the author proposed the following alphabet for the Russian language: Aa, Bb, Cc, Dd, Ee, Ff, Gg, Hh, Iiĭ, Jj, Kk, Ll, Mm, Nn, Oo, Pp, Rr, Ss, Tt, Uu, Vv, Zz, Чч, Шш, Ыы, Юю, Яя.

In 1842 Kodinsky proposed in the book “Simplification of Russian grammar” the Latin alphabet for the Russian language. In 1857 he published the book “Transformation and simplification of Russian spelling”, in which he again proposed to introduce Latin. The proposed Kodin alphabet was a mixture of Romanian, Hungarian and French Latin: Aa, Bb, Cc, Dd, Ee, Ff, Gg, Hh, Ii, Jj, Ll, Mm, Nn, Oo, Pp, Qq, Rr, Ss, Tt, Uu, Üü, Vv, Xx, Yy, Zz. There were quite complex rules of orthography:

- é (ё), q (к);
- c (к) at the end of words, before consonants and not palatalized vowels, in the same sense digraph ch (ruchi);
- c (ч) before palatalized vowels (but compare: noch);
- g (г) at the end of words, before consonants and non-palatalized vowels, in the same sense digraph gh (noghi);
- g (ж) before palatalized vowels (giznh);
- x (х) at the end of words, before consonants and non-palatalized vowels, in the same sense digraph xh (croxhi);
- h (ь, ъ). Digraphs: cz (ц), sz (ш), sc (щ), hi (ы) — rhibhi, bhil, szarhi. In words of foreign origin ç (ц) was used, -ция in foreign words was rendered -tia. End of surnames -ов, -ев was rendered -of, -ef. One sound could be rendered in different letters: еа (я) after consonants, in other cases ia;
- ѣ in adverbs and pronouns denoted ee (in other cases ê);
- -е, -ие, -ье → è;
- i in the end was used for й. Letter у rendered the combination ий/ый or sound [i] in words of Greek origin (ubycza, novy, systema). The combination шн was rendered by the trigraph chn. Grapheme diphthongs are also introduced: Eugeny, Aurora.

In 1845, a Russian Latin alphabet that excluded digraphs and diacritics was suggested by V. Belinsky: Aa, Bb, Cc, Dd, Ee, Ff, Gg, Hh, Ii, Jj, Kk, Ll, Mm, Nn, Oo, Pp, Rr, Ss, Ꞩꞩ, Tt, Uu, Vv, Хх, Чч, Цц, Zz, Ƶƶ, Ъъ, Ьь, Уу, Яя, Ŋŋ.

In 1862, Julian Kotkowski suggested in a pamphlet that all Slavs use the Polish alphabet.

In 1871, Zasyadko proposed his Latin project.

=== Soviet project ===
In 1919, the Scientific Department of the People's Commissariat, not without the participation of People's Commissar A. V. Lunacharsky, spoke "... about the desirability of introducing the Latin font for all nationalities inhabiting the territory of the Republic ... which is a logical step on the path to which Russia has already entered, adopting a new calendar style and metric system of weights and measures. This would be the completion of the alphabetic reform, once performed by Peter I, and would be in connection with the last orthographic reform.

In the 1920s and 1930s, a wave of Latinization of the writing of non-Russian peoples swept across the country, and Cyrillic was reduced to the absolute. The territory of the USSR, where the Cyrillic alphabet (Russian) was used, was already a kind of wedge, because Latin was used in the north and east of Siberia (Komi, Yakutia). In the south of the country (Central Asia), Latin was also used. The same in the Volga region (Tatar and Bashkir ASSR) and other regions (Caucasus).

In 1929, the People's Commissariat of Education of the RSFSR formed a commission to develop the question of the Latinization of the Russian alphabet, headed by Professor N. F. Yakovlev and with the participation of linguists, bibliologists, and printing engineers. In total, the commission included 13 people, including:

- A. M. Sukhotin,
- L. I. Zhirkov (had experience in creating alphabets with N. F. Yakovlev),
- A. M. Peshkovsky,
- N. M. Karinsky,
- S. I. Abakumov (famous Russianist),
- V. I. Lytkin (secretary, the first linguist of the Komi people).

The commission completed its work in January 1930. The final document (signed by all but AM Peshkovsky) proposed three versions of n Latin, slightly different from each other (published in № 6 "Culture and Literature of the East" in 1930). From the minutes of the commission meeting of 14 January 1930: "The transition in the near future of Russian to a single international alphabet on a Latin basis — is inevitable."

Variants of the three previous projects were as follows:

1. Eliminates diacritical marks, separate from the letters
2. strives for maximum use of its own Latin characters in printing houses;
3. on the basis of the “New Turkic Alphabet”.

These 3 projects differed only in the display of the letters ё ы ь я ю (the last five positions in the table below excluding щ). In the first version, the alphabet consisted of 30 letters, and in the second and third of 29 (due to the dual use of j):

Cyrillic	Latin	Cyrillic	Latin	Cyrillic	Latin	Cyrillic	Latin		
А а	A a	И и	I i	Р р	R r	Ш ш	Ş ş		
Б б	B b	Й й	J j	С с	S s	Ё ё	Ó ó	Ö ö	Ɵ ɵ
В в	V v	К к	K k	Т т	T t	Ы ы	Y y	Y y	Ь ь
Г г	G g	Л л	L l	У у	U u	Ь ь	Í í	J j	J j
Д д	D d	М м	M m	Ф ф	F f	Ю ю	Ú ú	Ü ü	Y y
Е е, Э э	E e	Н н	N n	Х х	X x	Я я	Á á	Ä ä	Ə ə
Ж ж	Ƶ ƶ	О о	O o	Ц ц	Ç ç	Щщ	SC Sc sc		
З з	Z z	П п	P p	Ч ч	C c				

The letter Щ was represented by the digraph sc: jesco (ещё), vesci (вещи).

After ж, ч, ш, and щ, it was suggested to write o instead of ё — cort (чёрт), scot (счёт). This idea would later be proposed again in the attempted 1964 spelling reform.

The principle of the Russian Cyrillic alphabet remained, according to which the softness of consonants before vowels is reflected by means of special vowels (я, ю, ё, е), and in other cases with an additional letter ь.

In the first version of the softening sign corresponded to a special letter í, and in the second and third for ь and й the same letter was used j.

Where я, ю, ё and е transmit two sounds (at the beginning of syllables), they were asked to write in two letters: яблоко — jabloko, Югославия — Jugoslavija. The hard sign (ъ) was therefore excluded from the alphabet as an unnecessary letter: съезд — sjezd. Thus in all variants of the project the soft sign (ь) before я, е, ё and ю when writing a new alphabet was dropped: Нью-Йорк, вьюга — Nju-Jork, vjuga.

Examples written for three projects:

Cyrillic	Latin			Cyrillic	Latin		
Cyrillic	1	2	3	Cyrillic	1	2	3
этот	etot			лук	luk		
еда	jeda			люк	lúk	lük	lyk
подъезд	podjezd			мол	mol		
ёлка	jolka			мёл	mól	möl	mɵl
подъём	podjom			мель	melí	melj	
яма	jama			кон	kon		
изъян	izjan			конь	koní	konj	
юг	jug			топ	top		
адъюнкт	adjunkt			топь	topí	topj	
рай	raj			дьяк	djak		
зной	znoj			льёт	ljot		
улей	ulej			вьюга	vjuga		
дуй	duj			все	vse		
мел	mel			всё	vsó	vsö	vsɵ
мал	mal			чёрный	cornyj		cornьj
мял	mál	mäl	məl	объём	objom		

On January 25, 1930, the Politburo of the Central Committee of the All-Union Communist Party (Bolsheviks), under the chairmanship of Stalin, instructed Glavnauka to stop working on the question of the Latinization of the Russian alphabet.

The case did not reach the practical implementation of the project. His memory remained mainly in a humorous context: in the popular novel by I. A. Ilf and Ye. P. Petrov "The Little Golden Calf" describes the invented comrade Polykhaev's (head of the company called "Hercules") universal stamp with the following text:

In response to ..........................

we, the Herculeans, as one person, will answer:

<...>

k) a general translation of the records into the Latin alphabet,

as well as everything you need in the future.

It is reported that employees were "particularly confused by the paragraph about the Latin alphabet." Although the action of the novel dates back to 1930 — the apogee of the Soviet campaign for Latinization, it is clear that the decisive promise in the city of the Black Sea (i. e. in Odessa) was premature and absurd.

After 1936, apparently no one thought about transition of the Russian language to the Latin script, because the opposite process began — Cyrillisation. Work on the recording of the Russian language in the Latin script moved into the plane of development of transliteration systems. See Romanization of Russian.

=== Cases of Latin use in the post-Soviet period ===
The original way of transmitting the Russian language in Latin was proposed in 2005 by Lyudmila Petrushevskaya, calling it "Nikolaitsa" in honor of her grandfather, the linguist N.F. Yakovlev.

On August 25, 2017, Vladimir Petrov, a deputy of the Legislative Assembly of the Leningrad Region, addressed the Ministry of Education and Science of the Russian Federation and the Russian Academy of Sciences with a request to create a second Russian alphabet based on the Latin alphabet. The deputy asked officials and academics to study the arguments in favor of creating a single Latin alphabet of the Russian language, as well as its parallel implementation for use and study in Russian educational institutions.

== See also ==
- Latinisation in the Soviet Union
- Belarusian Latin alphabet
- Romanization of Russian
- Ukrainian Latin alphabet

== Bibliography ==
- Алпатов В. М. Про латинізації російської мови // мікроязик. Мови. Інтер'язикі: збірник на пошану ординарного професора А. Д. Дуліченко / під ред. А. Кюннапа, В. Лефельдта, С. Н. Кузнєцова; Тартуський університет, кафедра слов'янської філології. — Tartu : Tartu Ülikool, 2006. — 576 с. — С. 271-279. — ( ISBN 9949-11-444-6 ).
- Грот, Я. К. (1873). Спорные вопросы русскаго правописанія отъ Петра Великаго донынѣ [Controversial issues of Russian spelling from Peter the Great to the present day].
