= God Save the Tsar! =

Former national anthem of the Russian Empire

Bózhe, Tsaryá khraní!
English: God Save the Tsar!
- Боже, Царя храни!
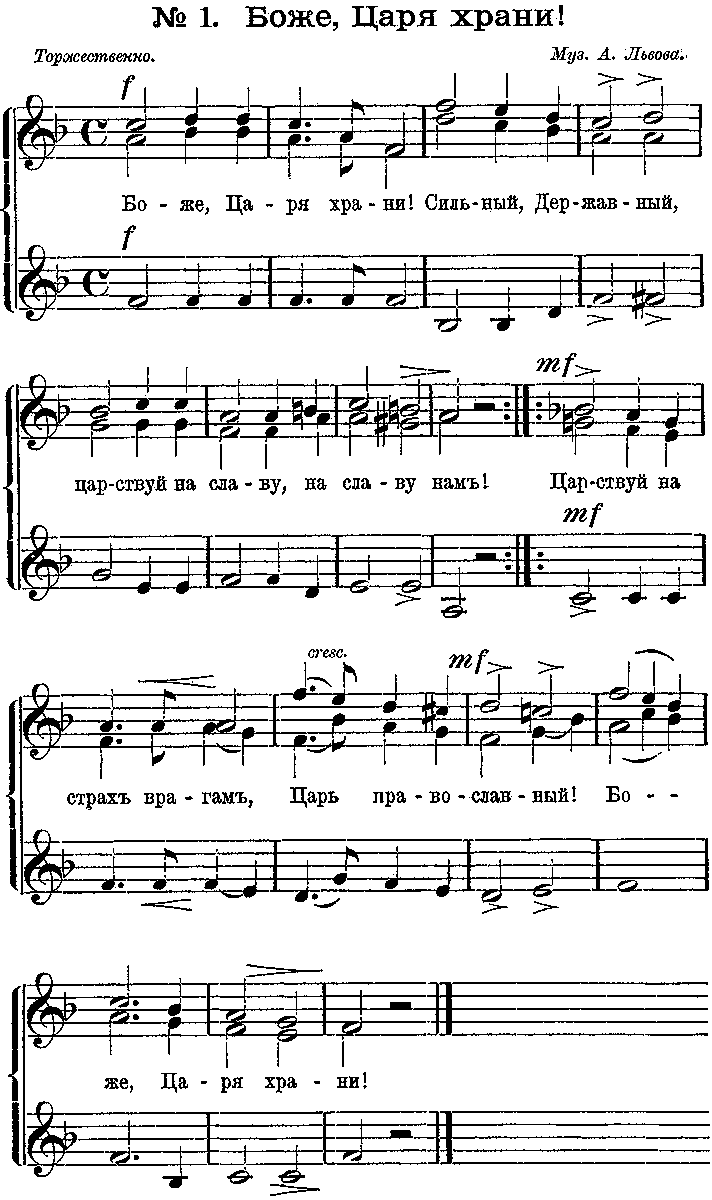
- Former national anthem of Russia Former royal anthem of Bulgaria (1878–1908)
- Lyrics: Vasily Zhukovsky
- Music: Alexei Lvov
- Adopted: 31 December 1833
- Relinquished: 18 October 1867 (Alaska) 5 October 1908 (Bulgaria) 15 March 1917 (Russia)
- Preceded by: "The Prayer of Russians"
- Succeeded by: "Worker's Marseillaise" (Russia) "Anthem of His Majesty the Tsar" (Bulgaria) "Hail, Columbia" (Alaska)

Audio sample
- Choral version (recorded in 1915): file; help

"God Save the Tsar!" (Russian: Боже, Царя храни!, IPA: [ˈboʐɨ tsɐˈrʲa xrɐˈnʲi]) was the national anthem of the Russian Empire. The song was chosen from a competition held in 1833 and was first performed on 18 December 1833. It was composed by violinist Alexei Lvov, with lyrics written by the court poet Vasily Zhukovsky. It was the anthem until the February Revolution of 1917, after which "Worker's Marseillaise" was adopted as the new national anthem until the overthrow of the Russian Provisional Government by the Bolsheviks in the October Revolution of the same year.

== Lyrics ==
Circa 1897 recording, Columbia Phonograph Company (wax cylinder)

1904 or 1905 version

Russian original	𝄆 Боже, Царя храни! Сильный, державный, Царствуй на славу, на славу намъ! 𝄇 𝄆 Царствуй на страхъ врагамъ, Царь православный! Боже, Царя храни! 𝄇
Transliteration	𝄆 Bózhe, Tsaryá khraní! Sílnyy, derzhávnyy, Tsárstvuy na slávu, na slávu nam! 𝄇 𝄆 Tsárstvuy na strakh vragam, Tsar pravoslávnyy! Bózhe, Tsaryá khraní! 𝄇
IPA transcription	𝄆 [ˈbo.ʐɨ tsɐ.ˈrʲæ xrɐ.ˈnʲi ‖] [ˈsʲilʲ.nɨj | dʲɪr.ˈʐav.nɨj |] [ˈtsar.stvʊj nɐ ˈsɫa.vʊ | nɐ ˈsɫa.vʊ nam ‖] 𝄇 𝄆 [ˈtsar.stvʊj nɐ ˈstrax vrɐ.ˈgam |] [ˈtsarʲ prə.vɐ.ˈsɫav.nɨj ‖] [ˈbo.ʐɨ tsɐ.ˈrʲæ xrɐ.ˈnʲi ‖] 𝄇
English translation	𝄆 God, save the Tsar! Strong and sovereign, Reign for glory, for our glory! 𝄇 𝄆 Reign to the terror of our enemies, Orthodox Tsar! God, save the Tsar! 𝄇

== Influence ==
Many composers made use of the theme in their compositions, most notably Tchaikovsky, who quoted it in the 1812 Overture, the Marche Slave, his overture on the Danish national anthem, and the Festival Coronation March. During the Soviet era, authorities altered Tchaikovsky's music (such as the 1812 Overture and Marche Slave), substituting other patriotic melodies, such as the "Glory" chorus from Mikhail Glinka's opera A Life for the Tsar, for "God Save the Tsar". Charles Gounod uses the theme in his Fantaisie sur l'Hymne National Russe (Fantasy on the Russian National Hymn). William Walton's score for the 1970 film Three Sisters, based on Chekhov's play, is dominated by the theme.

In 1842, English author Henry Chorley wrote "God, the Omnipotent!", set to Lvov's tune and published in 19th- and 20th-century hymnals as the Russian Hymn. The Russian Hymn tune continues to appear in various modern English language hymnals, such as those of the United Methodist Church, the Presbyterian Church, the Lutheran Book of Worship of the Evangelical Lutheran Church in America, or as Russia in The Hymnal 1982 of the U.S. Episcopal Church.

The same melody is also used with different lyrics for various institutional songs: Doxology of Phi Gamma Delta, "Noble Fraternity" of Phi Kappa Psi, West Chester University Alma Mater, "Hail, Pennsylvania!" (alma mater of the University of Pennsylvania), "Hail, Hail to Carleton!" (alma mater of Carleton College), "Dear Old Macalester" (alma mater of Macalester College), "Hail, Delta Upsilon" (Delta Upsilon fraternity), "Firm Bound in Brotherhood" (official song of the Order of the Arrow), the UST High School Hymn of the University of Santo Tomas High School in Manila, and the alma mater of Texas Woman's University, Jesuit College Preparatory School of Dallas in Dallas, Texas, Westover School in Middlebury, Connecticut titled "Raise Now to Westover", Tabor Academy in Marion, Massachusetts, Dimmitt High School in Dimmitt, Texas, Grant High School in Portland, Oregon, Jesuit High School in Tampa, Florida, Windber Area High School in Windber, Pennsylvania and the former St Peter's High School in McKeesport, Pennsylvania.

Maurice Jarre's score for the 1965 film Doctor Zhivago uses this melody in several tracks, most notably in the Overture. The anthem, played by the Band of the Welsh Guards, was used as the theme music for the epic BBC television adaptation of War and Peace in 1972. The Royal Scots Dragoon Guards continue to play "God Save the Tsar!" at formal events as a tribute to Nicholas II as the former colonel-in-chief of their predecessor, the Scots Greys.

In 1998, singer-songwriter Alexander Gradsky, one of the best-known rock artists during the Soviet period, proposed using the theme again as the Russian national anthem, but with substantially different lyrics from those originally written by Zhukovsky.

=== Usage in Bulgaria ===
The composition was used as the royal anthem of the Principality of Bulgaria, having been imposed by the temporary Russian government and the Russian army commanders. The usage of it in Bulgaria was relinquished after the Bulgarian Declaration of Independence in 1908.

== See also ==
- "The Prayer of the Russians", another anthem with a near-identical incipit
- "God Save the King", another anthem with a similar title
- "God Save the South", another anthem with a similar title
- "O Sanctissima", a Catholic Marian hymn with a similar melody
