= Alexei Lvov =

Russian composer (1798–1870)

Alexei Fyodorovich Lvov
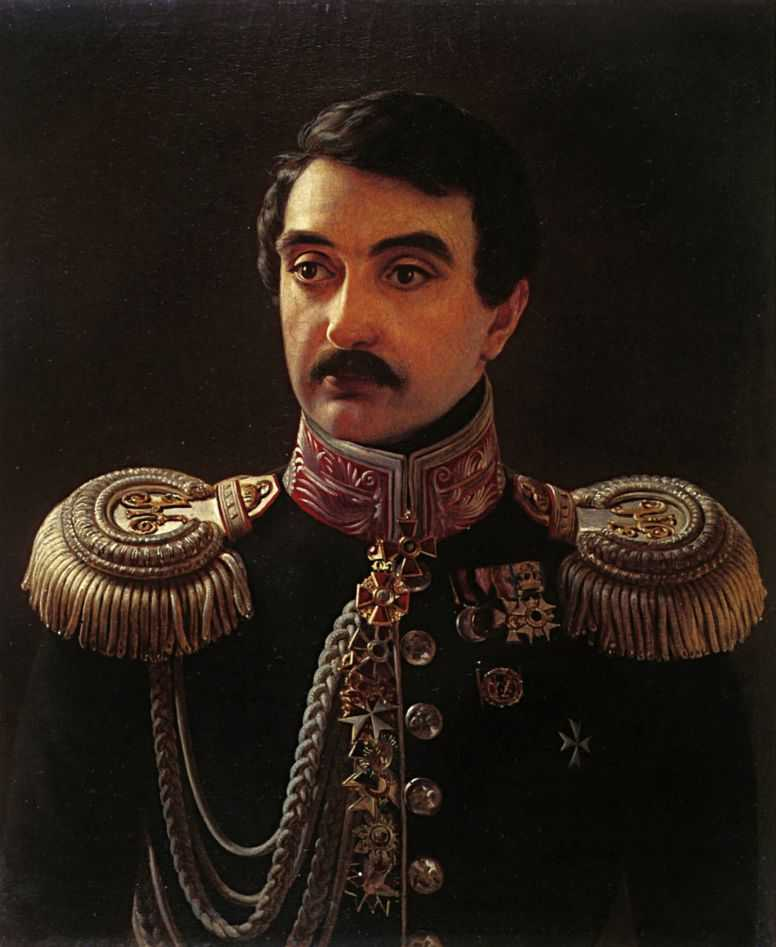
- Portrait by Alexei Tyranov
- Born: 5 June 1798; Reval, Russian Empire
- Died: 28 December 1870 (aged 72); Romainiai, Kovno Governorate, Russian Empire
- Resting place: Pažaislis Monastery, Kaunas
- Occupations: Army officer; violinist; composer; conductor

Alexei Fyodorovich Lvov (Russian: Алексей Фёдорович Львов; 5 June [O.S. 25 May] 1798 – 28 December [O.S. 16 December] 1870) was a Russian composer, best known for the composition of the imperial-era Russian national anthem, God Save the Tsar.

== Biography ==
Lvov was born into a family which was very interested in music. He was the son of Feodor Petrovich Lvov, who was Maestro of the Imperial Chapel in St Petersburg from 1826 to 1836 (having succeeded Bortniansky). Lvov codified the traditional Russian liturgical musical style called "Obikhod," which is the standard repertory of most Russian Orthodox churches in the world. It is a simple style. These melodies were later edited and improved by Bakhmetev.

Alexei Fyodorovich began violin lessons at a very young age and performed regularly in concerts given at his home: for instance, at 9 he was the soloist in a performance of a violin concerto by Viotti. Although he had a number of teachers in his youth, from the age of 19 onwards he began to study independently, seeking to develop his own personal style through careful attention to the works of such celebrated violinists as Corelli, Tartini, Viotti, Kreutzer, Rode and Paganini. He nevertheless continued to study composition formally under the supervision of I. G. Miller (who was also one of the teachers of Glinka).

Outside the world of music, his general education had a technical emphasis. In 1818, he completed his studies at the Institute of Communications, and embarked on a career as a civil engineer in the Imperial Army, eventually attaining the rank of general. In 1828, he was appointed Aide-de-camp to Tsar Nicholas I.

Lvov formed a string quartet in St Petersburg, and organised weekly concerts at his private residence, which were attended by members of high society. At these concerts it was quite usual for there to be guest performances by distinguished musicians who were visiting the Russian capital; among these were Liszt, Robert and Clara Schumann, and Berlioz. His quartet undertook a number of tours in Europe, where Lvov was able to perform to public audiences (in his home country he was able to play only to private audiences owing to his elevated social rank). He also counted Mendelssohn, Meyerbeer and Spontini amongst his personal friends.

In 1837, Lvov succeeded his father as Maestro of the Imperial Chapel, remaining in the position until 1861. In 1850, he founded the Russian Concert Society (Русское концертное общество), which was among the pioneers of symphonic concerts in Russia. In 1867, with the onset of deafness, he was obliged to withdraw from musical activity.

As a composer, Lvov's style was eclectic. He combined the traditions of Russian musical culture with strong Italian and (especially) German influences.

Lvov was married, and had a son and two daughters.

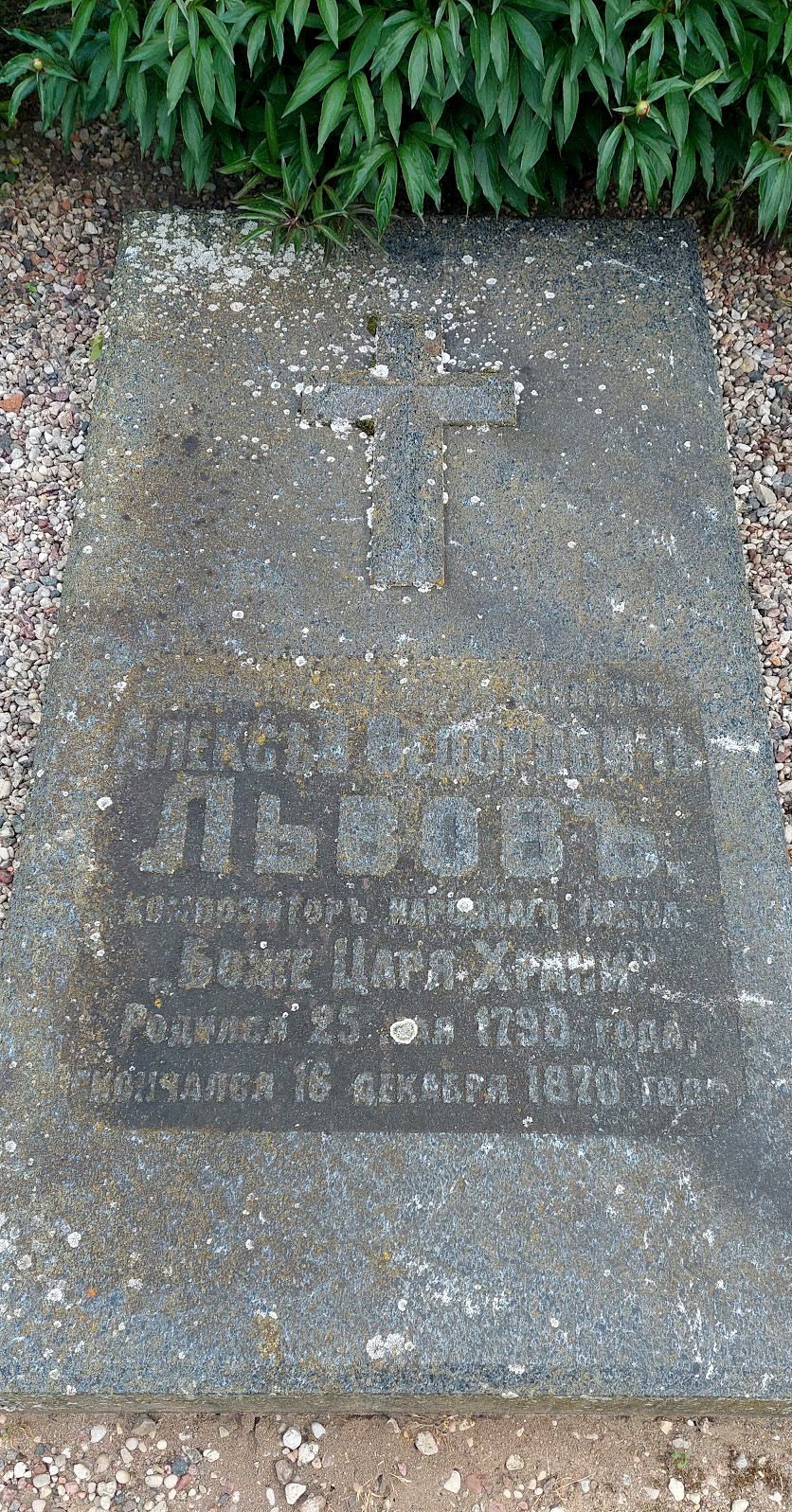
Alexei Lvov's grave at Pažaislis Monastery in Kaunas, Lithuania.

He was entombed in the Pažaislis Monastery, Kaunas (Lithuania).

== Musical compositions ==
- the Former Regional Anthem of Pennsylvania «Hail, Pennsylvania!»
- the Russian Imperial Anthem «Боже, Царя храни»
- Religious works, «Иже херувимы» (Note: "Иже херувимы" is a common Russian title of "Cherubikon") and «Вечери Твоея тайныя» ("Of Thy Mystical Supper"), etc.
- Bianca and Gualtiero («Бианка и Гвальтьеро»), (opera), 1844
- Undina («Ундина») (opera), 1847. The libretto, by Vladimir Alexandrovich Sollogub, was based on Vasily Zhukovsky's translation of Friedrich de la Motte Fouqué's Ondine. (The same libretto was later used by Tchaikovsky.) Lvov's Undina was performed in St Petersburg in 1848.
- Operettas "Russian Peasant" («Русский мужичок») and Varvara («Варвара»).
- Concerto for Violin and Orchestra
- revised version of Pergolesi's Stabat Mater, for soloists, chorus and orchestra
- 24 Caprices for violin (24 каприса)
- Dramatic Fantasy for violin and cello (an idea which was given to him by Meyerbeer). (Драматическая фантазия для скрипки и виолончели)

== Other publications ==
These include:

- A Free and Asymmetric Rhythm («О свободном и несимметричном ритме») (this is a work which examines and discusses Old Slavonic religious chants) (1858)
- A Beginner's Guide to the Violin, with 24 musical examples («Советы начинающему играть на скрипке с 24 музыкальными примерами») (in collaboration with V. Odoevskij) (circa 1859/1860).

== Discography ==
- Russian national anthem - Arthur Pryor's Band (Victor - 62481, 1904)
- Hail, Pennsylvania! - Peerless Quartet (Victor - 17384, 1913)
- Russian Imperial Anthem - Bass and orchestra - Marcel Journet, bass; Walter B. Rogers, conductor (Victor - 74464, 1916)
- Repentance, op. 34 - Siberian Singers; Nicholas Vasilieff, choir conductor (Victor - 4574, New York 1939)
- Boge czaria chrani (Russian song) - A. V. Aleksandrov, baritone (Columbia 1402, New York 1905)
- Boje Tsaria khrani (National anthem of Russia) - Columbia Military Band (Columbia - A1733, New York 1914)
- Russian national hymn - New York Military Band (Edison - 50186, New York 1914)
- Violin Concerto in A minor - Sergei Stadler, violin; Vladislav Chernushenko, conductor; Leningrad Philharmonic Symphony Orchestra (Melodija, 1986)

== Sources ==
- "Львов, Алексей Федорович" . Brockhaus and Efron Encyclopedic Dictionary (in Russian). 1906.
