= Elisheva Bikhovski =

Russian and Israeli writer (1888–1949)

- אלישבע ז'ירקובה-ביחוֹבסקי
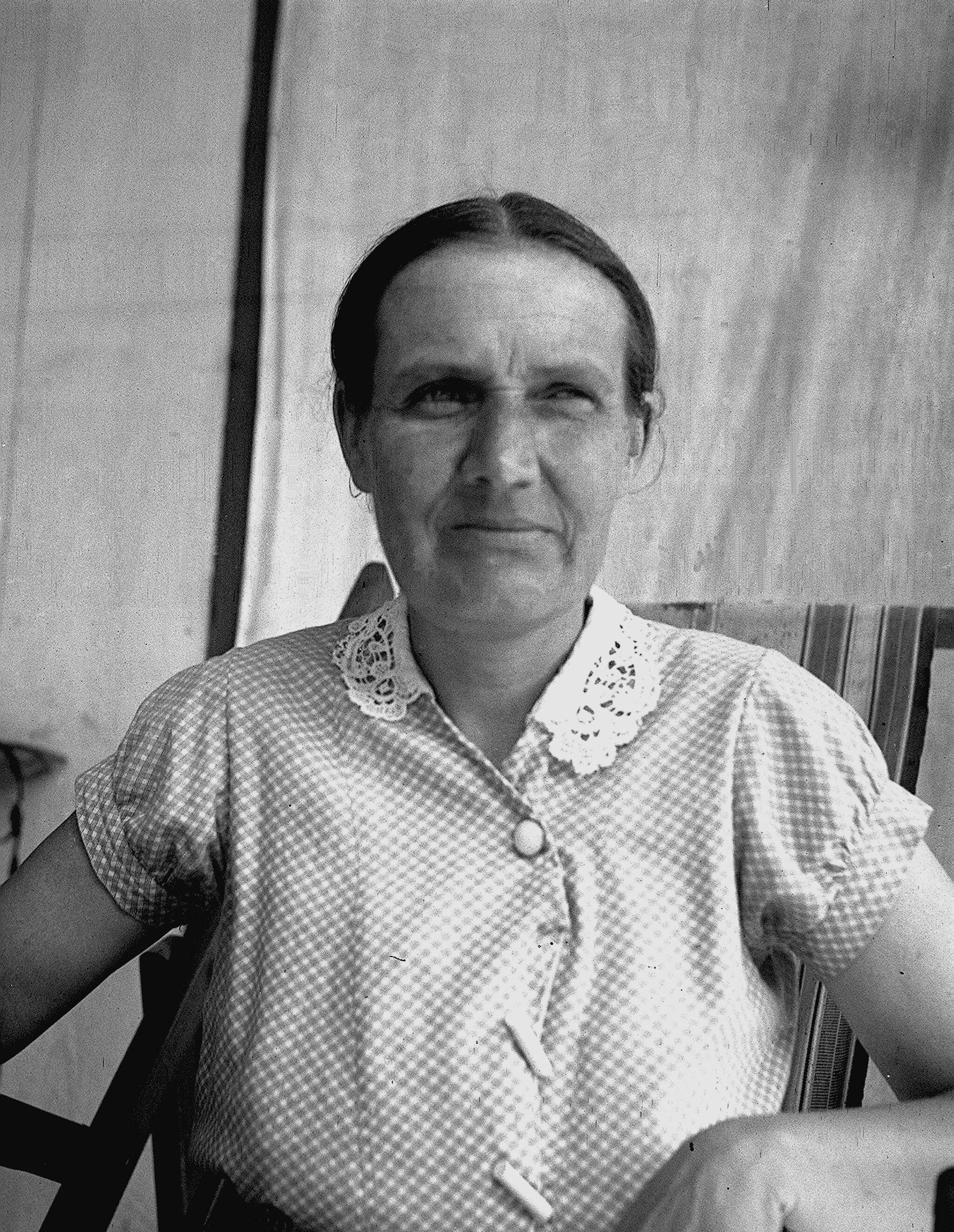
- Bikhovski in 1936
- Born: Elizaveta Ivanovna Zhirkova; 20 September 1888; Spassk, Ryazan Governorate, Russian Empire
- Died: 27 March 1949 (aged 60); Tiberias, Israel
- Resting place: Kvutzat Kinneret cemetery
- Citizenship: Russian Empire, Israel
- Occupations: Writer; translator
- Spouse: Simeon (Shimon) Bikhovski
- Children: Miriam Littel
- Writing career
- Pen name: E. Lisheva
- Language: Hebrew, Russian, English, Yiddish
- Years active: 1907–1949

Elisheva Bikhovski (Russian: Элишева Быховская, romanized: Elisheva Bykhovskaya; born Elizaveta Ivanovna Zhirkova, Russian: Елизавета Ивановна Жиркова; 20 September 1888 – 27 March 1949) was a Russian and Israeli poet, writer, literary critic and translator, often known simply by her adopted Biblical Hebrew name "Elishéva" (Hebrew: אֱלִישֶׁבַע). Her Russian Orthodox father, Ivan Zhirkov, was a village teacher who later became a bookseller and textbook publisher; her mother was descended from Irish Catholics who had settled in Russia after the Napoleonic Wars (1803–1815). Elisheva wrote most of her works in Hebrew, and also translated English and Hebrew poetry into Russian.

On the death of her mother in 1891, she moved to Moscow with her aunt, an older sister of her mother, where she lived surrounded by the English language and culture. Though not culturally Jewish, she became the classmate of Jewish girls who introduced her to their culture and traditions, and she began to write poetry in 1907. Not at first differentiating between Hebrew and Yiddish as the “language of the Jews,” she began studying Yiddish — which, she wrote, because of its kinship to other European languages, especially German, she found easy to understand. She learned the Hebrew alphabet from a Hebrew grammar book owned by her brother, the philologist and Esperantist Lev Zhirkov (1885–1963), a specialist in Persian and Caucasian languages. She studied both Russian and English literature, graduating from a grammar school for girls and in 1910 becoming certified as a teacher at a progressive school of Stanislaus Shatsky's and Alexander Zelenko's Children's Work and Play Society through courses that trained preschool and elementary teachers according to the system of the innovative German educator Friedrich Fröbel (1782–1852).

== Hebrew education ==
=== Pre-revolutionary times ===
Elisheva recalls in her memoir that already in elementary school she had become familiar with names of places that featured in adventure books for young people, including several Latin American cities and Galveston, Texas. Her interest in Hebrew was kindled after she chanced upon a Hebrew-language newspaper and saw an advertisement for a steamship company recommended as an easy, convenient way to cross the Atlantic Ocean. At that time Galveston was a major port of entry to the United States for European emigrants, and with the aid of a German-language textbook for scholars of Biblical Hebrew, she was able to puzzle out first the name of Galveston and later the names of other geographical locations from which telegrams were sent for newspaper publication, such as London, Saint Petersburg and Berlin. But except for the datelines at the tops of news stories, she was unable to comprehend anything from that newspaper. Eventually, she writes, someone explained that there were two separate “Jewish” languages, both written in the same letters but very, very different in vocabulary and grammar.

Thus it was that in 1913 she began studying Hebrew through evening classes at the “Общество распространения правильных сведений о евреях и еврействе”, Obshchestvo rasprostraneniya pravil'nykh svedeniy o yevreyakh i yevreystve (“Society for the dissemination of correct information about Jews and Judaism”), founded in 1906 by a group of Jewish public figures in Moscow that included Uri Nissan Gnessin (1879–1913), Yosef Haim Brenner (1881–1921), Echiel Tschlenow (1864–1918) and her future husband, Simeon Bikhovski (1880–1932), who also began the publishing house Nisyonot (“Experiments”) in that year. For the first three months she had a young teacher whom she characterized as “both incredibly gifted and infinitely devoted to his cause.” The lessons were conducted by the direct method of "Hebrew through Hebrew", mainly through oral instruction and without a textbook.

"From the first lesson, I left with a precise knowledge of only two Hebrew words, but of the truth of this knowledge I did not have the slightest doubt. I knew what it means when the teacher turns to his pupils and asks, אתם מבינים, Atem mevinim? ('Do you understand?'). I had not seen the Hebrew letters yet, and only learned the sounds by ear. But this knowledge — as well as what was added over time in these lessons — was solid and thorough. It was systematic and correct knowledge that was impossible for me to lose."

Although that teacher was popular with his pupils, he aroused suspicion for going about in Moscow with a light summer coat and without galoshes. He had invited some of his students, who did not know enough Hebrew to be able to study on their own, to take Russian-language lessons in the Tanakh, or Jewish scriptures. The lessons, sporadic and conducted at the homes of various students, led to the group's being perceived as a new and possibly dangerous revolutionary group, and arrests and an inquiry followed. Lacking the required “право жительства”, pravo zhitel'stva (right of residence) in the capital, the teacher was regarded as living there illegally and was forced to leave Moscow, but Elisheva continued to learn Hebrew off and on during the next two years.

=== Soviet era ===
On the death of her father in 1917, Elisheva returned to Ryazan, the city of her birth. With that year's fall of the Russian monarchy, she witnessed street demonstrations “in celebration of freedom”, which had been forbidden under the former regime. In one of these demonstrations, she participated with a group of Jewish youths, marching in an orderly way under the new national flag singing Hatikvah, a modified version of which eventually became Israel’s national anthem.

In Ryazan, with some sleuthing and the help of a local rabbi, she was led to a scholar in an attic room who used to tutor boys in reciting the Jewish prayer book, the Siddur. This teacher — very young but with a thick, curly black beard — she wrote, combined “a taste for biblical grandeur with childlike naïveté.” After she demonstrated her ability to read the prayer book's morning blessing (Modah ani lefanecha... (“I thank You...”), he consented to help her continue her Hebrew study. Unfortunately, she wrote, he tended to direct conversation towards social and political problems, and her language lessons with him did not long continue.

She tried from time to time to study with Kantorovich's “Теория иврита”, Teoriya ivrita, a book she disparaged as “clearly outdated” with Russian explanations, translation exercises from Hebrew into Russian and back, and many “completely meaningless”, context-free sentences like: “Reuben lay on the bed with a bandage on his forehead.” Later she found another teacher, but, Elisheva writes, neither he nor she had suitable textbooks. Though that teacher had taught for many years, he had never taught the direct method, so they had to make use of Kantorovich's book.

From 1918 to 1919 she studied with another Hebrew teacher, a graduate of Herzliya Hebrew Gymnasium in Jaffa, a city that the British forces had just captured from the Ottoman Empire and which soon became part of the British Mandate for Palestine. The young man had come to Russia to visit relatives but had been drafted into the army. Wearing his regulation bulky grey uniform and so-called beetle-crusher boots, he met Elisheva in the street and the two were able to converse in Hebrew with the Sephardic pronunciation that Eliezer Ben Yehuda, the reviver of modern spoken Hebrew, was said to have preferred to the Ashkenazic one. “Before then,” she said, “it had not occurred to any of my teachers that it was possible to have a conversation in Hebrew.”

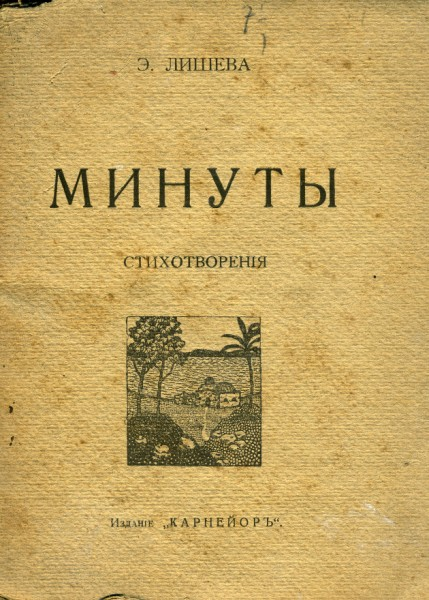
Elisheva's first published poems in Russian, with the illustrations of Ben-Zion Zuckerman (1904–1992).

== Writing career ==
Beginning in 1915, Elisheva's first translations from Yiddish into Russian were published in the Russian-language Jewish journal “Еврейская Жизнь” Evreskaya Zhizn (“Jewish Life”). These are mainly short stories by Hersh Dovid Nomberg (1876–1927), poems by Shmuel-Yankev Imber (1889–1942?) and indirect translations, via Hayim Nahman Bialik's Yiddish version, of the Hebrew poems of the 12th-century Judah Halevi. Later she began to translate into Russian the works of contemporary Hebrew writers such as Gershon Shofman (1880–1972) and Yosef Haim Brenner (1881–1921).

During her time in Ryazan between 1917 and 1919, as her Hebrew skills were deepening, she composed over 200 Russian poems, published by her fiancé Simeon Bikhovski in two 1919 collections, “Минуты” Minuty (“Minutes”) and “Тайные песни” Tainye Pesni (“Secret songs”). Both were published under her pseudonym “E. Lisheva” and showed a strong attachment to and longing for Jewish culture. From 1920, when she married Bikhovski, she published her first poems in Hebrew and definitively adopted the name Elisheva instead of her original Russian given name Elizaveta. Apparently influenced by both her original Hebrew teacher and by her husband, she now adopted Hebrew as her sole working language and ceased writing in Russian; Simeon himself adopted the Hebrew form of his name as Shimon. They married in a civil registry office because their difference of religions prohibited a religious wedding.

Elisheva's poetry also appeared in the almanac Ha-Tkufa (“Epoch”, Warsaw, 1921), the magazine Ha-Toren (“The Mast”, New York, 1922), Hapoel Hatzair (“The Young Worker”, Tel Aviv, 1923) and "Ha-Olam" ("The World", London, 1925). In 1925 the Bikhovskis moved to Palestine, with their young daughter Miriam (b. 1924), settling near the Herzliya Hebrew Gymnasium in Jaffa. There she published two poetry collections, Kos ktana (“Small Bowl,” Tel Aviv, 1926) and Haruzim (“Rhymes,” Tel Aviv, 1928), and her employment of Sephardic pronunciation in her poetry became the accepted norm. As one of Palestine's first Hebrew poets, Elisheva helped give form to the literary life of the emerging country, explaining: “I can point to but one goal in my work — to aid as much as possible in the development of Hebrew poetry in the Hebrew language that we speak among ourselves every day with the Sephardic pronunciation. Therefore I have refrained from all experimentation and pursuit of new forms or innovations in my poetry, because first and foremost I want to see Hebrew poetry that is vital, natural and inextricably linked with our language and our lives.”

The Jewish public were quite moved by Elisheva's having left her people and language behind to join the Jewish newcomers in their emergent homeland in Palestine. The literary community initially greeted her with enthusiasm, arranging readings of her works, which were widely published, even to the point that her popularity aroused resentment of some young poets (the Ketuvim “Writings” group, headed by Avraham Shlonsky, 1900–1973) and made her a target in their struggle against the older poets (the Moznayim “Scales” group, led by Hayyim Nahman Bialik, of which Elisheva herself was a member). This period lasted only seven years (1925–1932), during which Elisheva produced the bulk of her Hebrew poetry, prose, essays and literary criticism, with works published in the Hebrew press in Palestine (Moznayim, Do’ar ha-Yom) and abroad (Ha-Tkufa, Ha-Toren and Ha-Olam), or in books published by her husband's publishing house, Tomer. Elisheva: Kovez Ma’amarim odot ha-Meshoreret Elisheva (“Elisheva: Collected articles about the poet Elisheva” appeared in several editions in Tel Aviv and Warsaw, beginning in 1927, and Meshorer ve-Adam (“Poet and man”), an essay on the poetry of Alexander Blok, appeared in 1929). Kos Ketanah was the first book of poems by a woman poet, and Simta’ot the first novel by a woman, to be published in Palestine. Some of her small and melodious poems have been set to music, translations of individual Hebrew poems into Yiddish, Russian, Dutch, English, French, German, Hungarian, Italian, Polish and Welsh have been published by various periodicals, and new translations into Russian were included in a collection entitled Я себя до конца рассказала (“I told myself before the end,” Biblioteka Alia, 1981, 1990.)

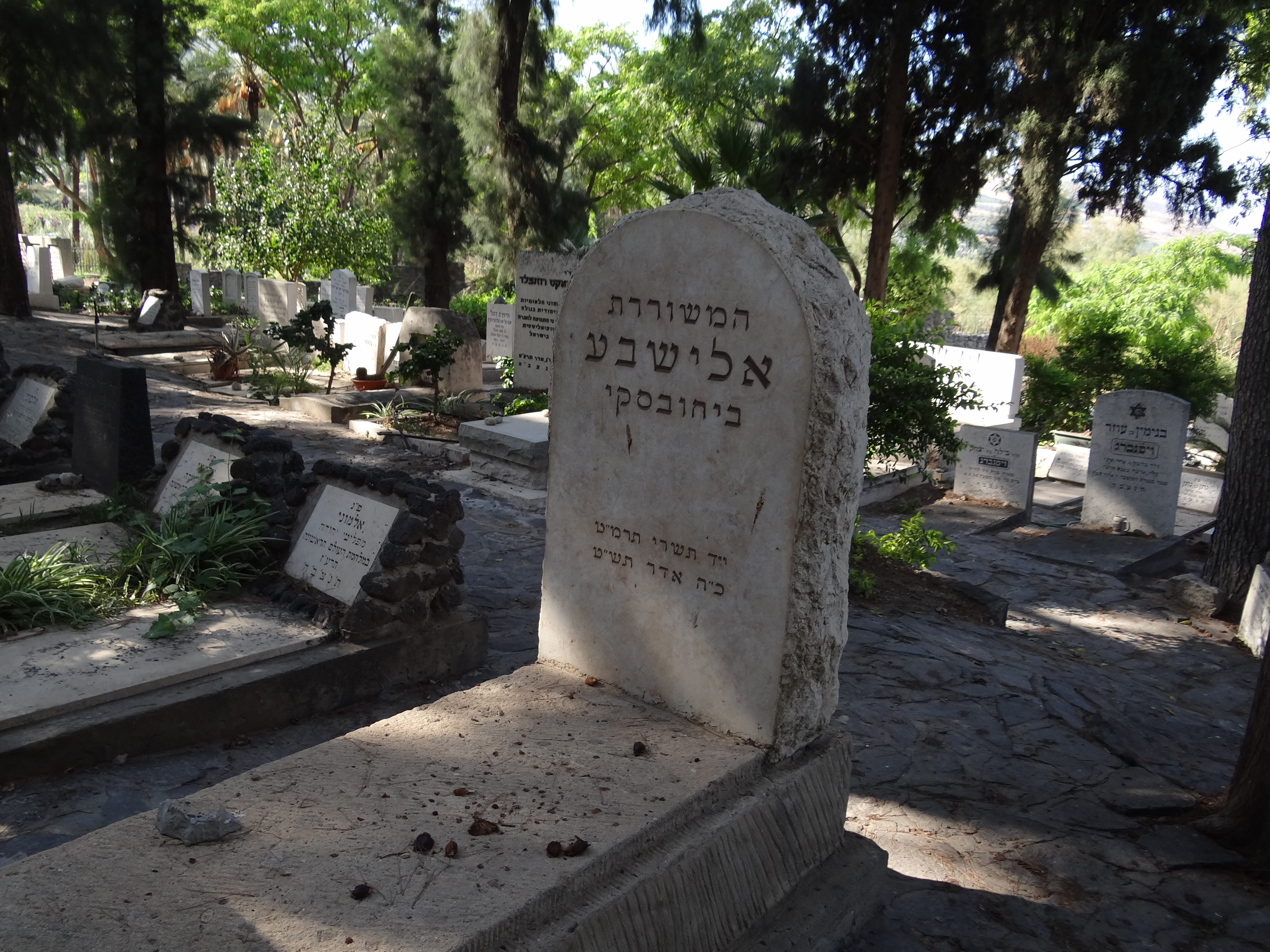
Elisheva's grave at Kvutzat Kinneret cemetery.

== In later years ==
Despite her writing career and his publishing business, the couple often found themselves in dire financial straits, and Elisheva was several times forced to leave her husband and daughter behind for literary tours of Jewish communities in Europe where she did poetry readings and told stories to large audiences at specially arranged events; during the school vacation in summer, her husband and daughter would accompany her. In the summer of 1932, in the midst of such a tour in Chișinău — then in Romania and now in Moldova — her husband, Shimon, suddenly died. Elisheva returned to Tel Aviv, sorrowing at her husband's death, and her attempts at earning a livelihood (among other things, as a librarian at Tel Aviv's Sha’ar Zion public library) were unsuccessful. Although she had earned a living from her literary tours of Europe, she and her daughter now fell into absolute poverty. She moved into a rundown shack on the edge of Tel Aviv, where she was saved from starvation when the poet Hayim Nahman Bialik secured for her a modest stipend of $15 monthly from the non-profit Israel Matz Foundation, a New York nonprofit organization established to aid indigent Hebrew writers.

Bitter and hurt over no longer being in literary favour among the Jews of her adopted Palestinian homeland, she cut herself off from society and ceased publishing new work. She did some translations, which she considered insignificant, but was forced to make ends meet by working as a laundress. Her daughter Miriam Littel served in the British Auxiliary Territorial Service (ATS) in Egypt during World War II and in 1946 married a British soldier, with whom she had three daughters, and in 1949 Elisheva had planned to visit them in England. Because she was not feeling well, however, some friends from the Davar HaPoelet women's magazine paid for her to have a visit to the hot springs in Tiberias, where she died of cancer on 27 March 1949. Despite the deep affection Elisheva maintained for Jewish culture and its involvement in the eventual establishment of the state of Israel, she had never converted to Judaism — a fact that she never hid; she always remained an Orthodox Christian — so difficulties arose as to the place of burial. Only upon the intervention of the chairman of the Hebrew Writers Association in Israel was it agreed that she could be buried in the cemetery of Kvutzat Kinneret, near the grave of the poet Rachel Bluwstein.

== Books published in Hebrew ==
- 1926: Kos Ketanah (“A little cup”), poetry
- 1926: Im Or Boker Be-Kol Rinah (“With morning light and a joyful song”), poetry
- 1928: Haruzim (“Rhymes”), poetry
- 1928: Sipurim (“Stories”), short stories
- 1929: Simta’ot (“Alleys”), novel
- 1929: Mikreh Tafel (“A minor incident”), story
- 1946: Shirim, (“Poems”)
- 1970: Yalkut shirim (“Collected poems”)

== Sources ==
- Arnon, Yochanan. “Our Sister Elisheva.” Et Mol (July 1978): 41–42.
- Barzel, Hillel. Elisheva and Her Novel Simta’ot. Tel Aviv: 1977, 280–298.
- Berlovitz, Yaffah. “Ruth from the Banks of the Volga.” Maariv Literary Supplement, 8 June 2000, 27. Berlovitz, Yaffah. “Round and Round the Garden: Mikreh Tafel and Five Other Stories.” Davar, 22 April 1977, 16.
- Elisheva, From My Memoirs. Elisheva Archives, Genazim (7863/5), Saul Tchernichowsky House, Tel Aviv
- Elisheva: The Collected Poems, with an introduction by Haim Toren. Tel Aviv: 1970, 9–16.
- Elisheva: Collected Articles about the Poet Elisheva. Warsaw and Tel Aviv: 1927.
- Kornhendler, Shulamit. “The Principle of Expansion of the Genre in the Work of Elisheva” Hebrew-language Master's thesis, Bar-Ilan University, 1999.
- Meron, Dan. Founding Mothers, Stepsisters. Tel Aviv: 1991, 25–33, 103–104, 154–155.
- Rattok, Lily, ed. “Every Woman Knows It: An Afterword,” in The Other Voice: Hebrew Women’s Literature. Tel Aviv: 1994, 268–269, 336–337.
- Rav-Hon, Orna. “The Confessional Model in the Work of Elisheva.” Master's thesis, Tel Aviv University, 1989.
- Shaked, Gershon. “Elisheva Bikhovsky (Zhirkova).” Hebrew Literature, 1880–1980, vol. 3, 87–93. Tel Aviv/Jerusalem: 1988.
