= The Prayer of Russians =

Former national anthem of Russia (1816–1833)

Molitva russkikh
English: "The Prayer of Russians"
- Молитва русских
- Former national anthem of Russia
- Lyrics: Vasily Zhukovsky
- Music: Based on that of "God Save the King"
- Adopted: 1816
- Relinquished: 1833
- Preceded by: "Let the Thunder of Victory Rumble!"
- Succeeded by: "God Save the Tsar!"

Audio sample
- The Prayer of Russians: file; help

"The Prayer of Russians" (Note: Russian: Молитва русских, romanized: Molitva russkikh, IPA: [mɐˈlʲitvə ˈruskʲɪx]) is a patriotic hymn that was used as the national anthem of Imperial Russia from 1816 to 1833.

After defeating the First French Empire, Tsar Alexander I of Russia recommended a national anthem for Russia. The lyrics were written by Vasily Zhukovsky, and the music of the British anthem "God Save the King" was used.

In 1833, "The Prayer of Russians" was replaced with "God Save the Tsar". The two songs both have identical incipits: «Боже, царя храни».

Some consider "God Save the Tsar" Russia's first true national anthem, as both its words and music were Russian. Others say that the title belongs to "Let the Thunder of Victory Rumble!", another popular song at the time, although it never had official status.

== Lyrics ==
The last four stanzas were seldomly used.

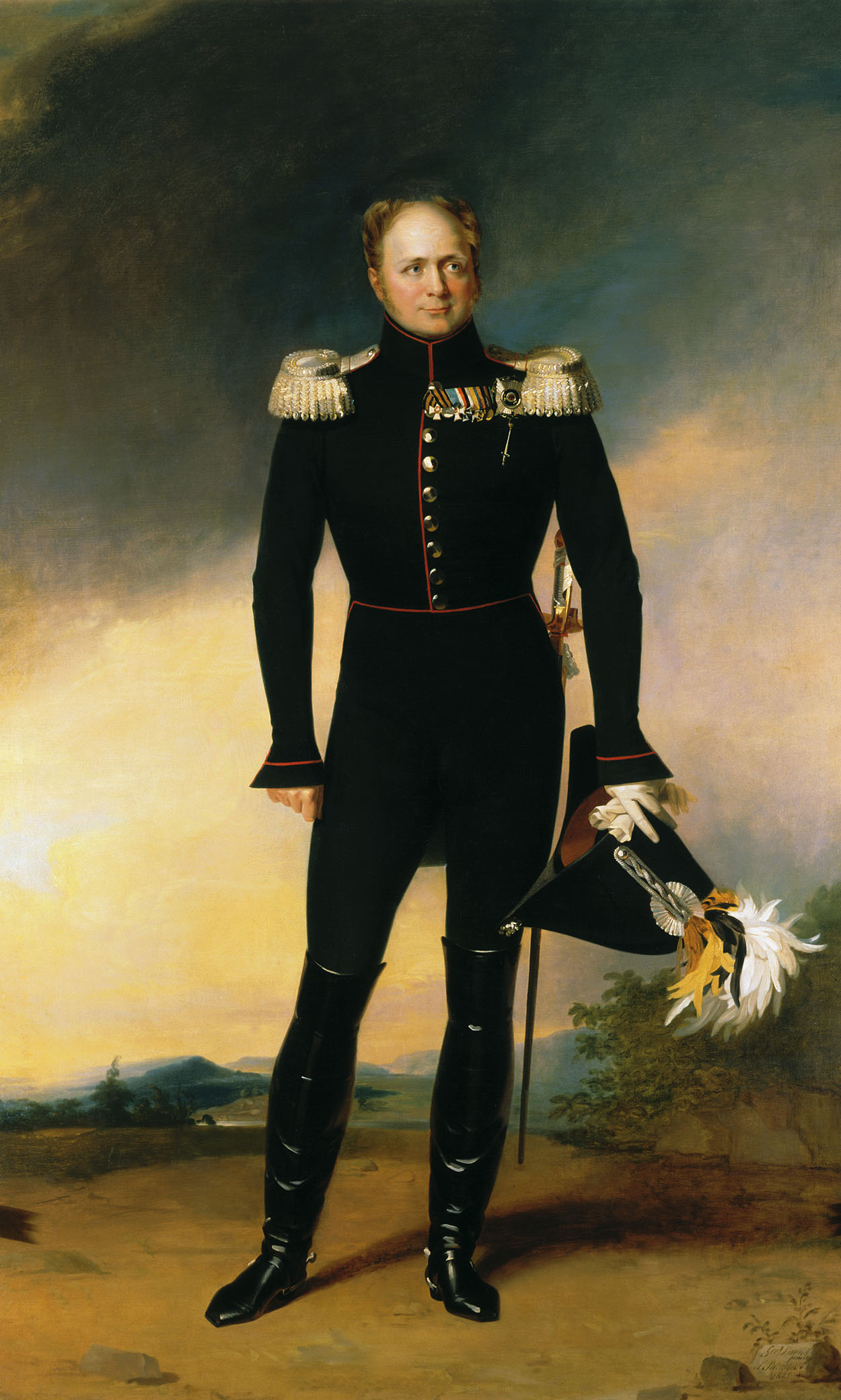
Portrait of Alexander I in the Military Gallery of the Winter Palace.

Russian original

Боже, Царя храни!
Славному долги дни
Дай на земли!
𝄆 Гордыхъ смирителю,
Слабыхъ хранителю,
Всѣхъ утѣшителю —
Всё ниспошли! 𝄇

Перводержавную
Русь Православную
Боже, храни!
𝄆 Царство ей стройное,
Въ силѣ спокойное!
Всё-жъ недостойное
Прочь отжени! 𝄇

Воинство бранное,
Славой избранное,
Боже, храни!
𝄆 Воинамъ мстителямъ,
Чести спасителямъ,
Миротворителямъ
Долгіе дни! 𝄇

Мирныхъ воителей
Правды блюстителей
Боже, храни!
𝄆 Жизнь ихъ примѣрную
Нелицемѣрную,
Доблестямъ вѣрную
Ты помяни! 𝄇

О, Провидѣніе!
Благословеніе
Намъ ниспошли!
𝄆 Къ благу стремленіе,
Въ счастьѣ смиреніе,
Въ скорби терпѣніе
Дай на земли! 𝄇

Будь намъ заступникомъ,
Вѣрнымъ сопутникомъ
Насъ провожай!
𝄆 Свѣтло-прелестная,
Жизнь поднебесная,
Сердцу извѣстная,
сердцу сіяй! 𝄇

Post-1917 spelling

Боже, Царя храни!
Славному долги дни
Дай на земли!
𝄆 Гордых смирителю,
Слабых хранителю,
Всех утешителю —
всё ниспошли! 𝄇

Перводержавную
Русь православную,
Боже, храни!
𝄆 Царство ей стройное,
В силе спокойное!
Всё ж недостойное
Прочь отжени! 𝄇

Воинство бранное,
Славой избранное,
Боже, храни!
𝄆 Воинам-мстителям,
Чести спасителям,
Миротворителям
Долгие дни! 𝄇

Мирных воителей,
Правды блюстителей
Боже, храни!
𝄆 Жизнь их примерную
Нелицемерную,
Доблестям верную
Ты помяни! 𝄇

О, Провидение!
Благословение
Нам ниспошли!
𝄆 К благу стремление,
В счастье смирение,
В скорби терпение
Дай на земли! 𝄇

Будь нам заступником,
Верным сопутником
Нас провожай!
𝄆 Светло-прелестная,
Жизнь поднебесная,
Сердцу известная,
Сердцу сияй! 𝄇

Latin transliteration

Bozhe, tsarya khrani!
Slavnomu dolgi dni
Day na zemli!
𝄆 Gordykh smiritelyu
Slabykh khranitelyu
Vsekh uteshitelyu —
Vso nisposhli! 𝄇

Pervoderzhavnuyu
Rus' pravoslavnuyu
Bozhe, khrani!
𝄆 Tsarstvo yey stroynoye,
V sile spokoynoye!
Vsyo-zh nedostoynoye
Proch' otzheni! 𝄇

Voinstvo brannoye,
Slavoy izbrannoye,
Bozhe, khrani!
𝄆 Voinam mstitelyam,
Chesti spasitelyam,
Mirotvoritelyam
Dolgiye dni! 𝄇

Mirnykh voiteley,
Pravdy blyustiteley,
Bozhe, khrani!
𝄆 Zhizn' ikh primernuyu,
Nelitsemernuyu,
Doblestyam vernuyu,
Ty pomyani! 𝄇

O, Provideniye!
Blagosloveniye
Nam nisposhli!
𝄆 K blagu stremleniye,
V shchastye smireniye,
V skorbi terpeniye
Day na zemli! 𝄇

Bud' nam zastupnikom,
Vernym soputnikom,
Nas provozhay!
𝄆 Svetlo-prelestnaya,
Zhizn' podnebesnaya,
Serdtsu izvestnaya,
Serdtsu siyay! 𝄇

English translation

God save the Tsar!
Long are the days of the great,
Conjure upon the earth!
𝄆 To the subduer of the proud,
To the guardian of the weak
To the consoler of everyone,
Grant him everything! 𝄇

The land of the first throne,
Orthodox Russia,
God save him!
𝄆 A harmonious reign for her,
Calm in strength;
And everything unworthy,
Drive away! 𝄇

The host of warriors,
Chosen by glory,
God save them!
𝄆 Avengers of war,
Saviours of honour,
Guardians of peace
Grant them long days! 𝄇

For our warriors of peace,
The guardians of truth,
God save them!
𝄆 Their exemplary lives,
Unfeigned lives,
Live true to valour,
Remember ye! 𝄇

O, Providence!
The blessing,
Grant it to us!
𝄆 Aspiration to good,
Humility in joy,
Patience in sorrow
Conjure upon the earth! 𝄇

Be our protector,
Our faithful companion,
Accompany us!
𝄆 Bright and charming,
Life under the skies,
Known to our hearts,
Shine in our hearts! 𝄇
