= Lev Zhirkov =

Lev Ivanovich Zhirkov
- Лев Иванович Жирков
- Born: 19 March 1885; Moscow
- Died: 4 December 1963 (aged 78); Moscow
- Citizenship: Russian Empire → USSR
- Education: Moscow State University, Saint Petersburg State University
- Awards: Order of the Red Banner of Labour

Lev Ivanovich Zhirkov (Russian: Лев Иванович Жирков; 19 March 1885, Moscow – 4 December 1963, Moscow) was a Soviet and Russian philologist, specializing in Persian and Caucasian languages, and Esperantist. Brother of Elisheva Bikhovski.
