= Bible translations into Catalan =

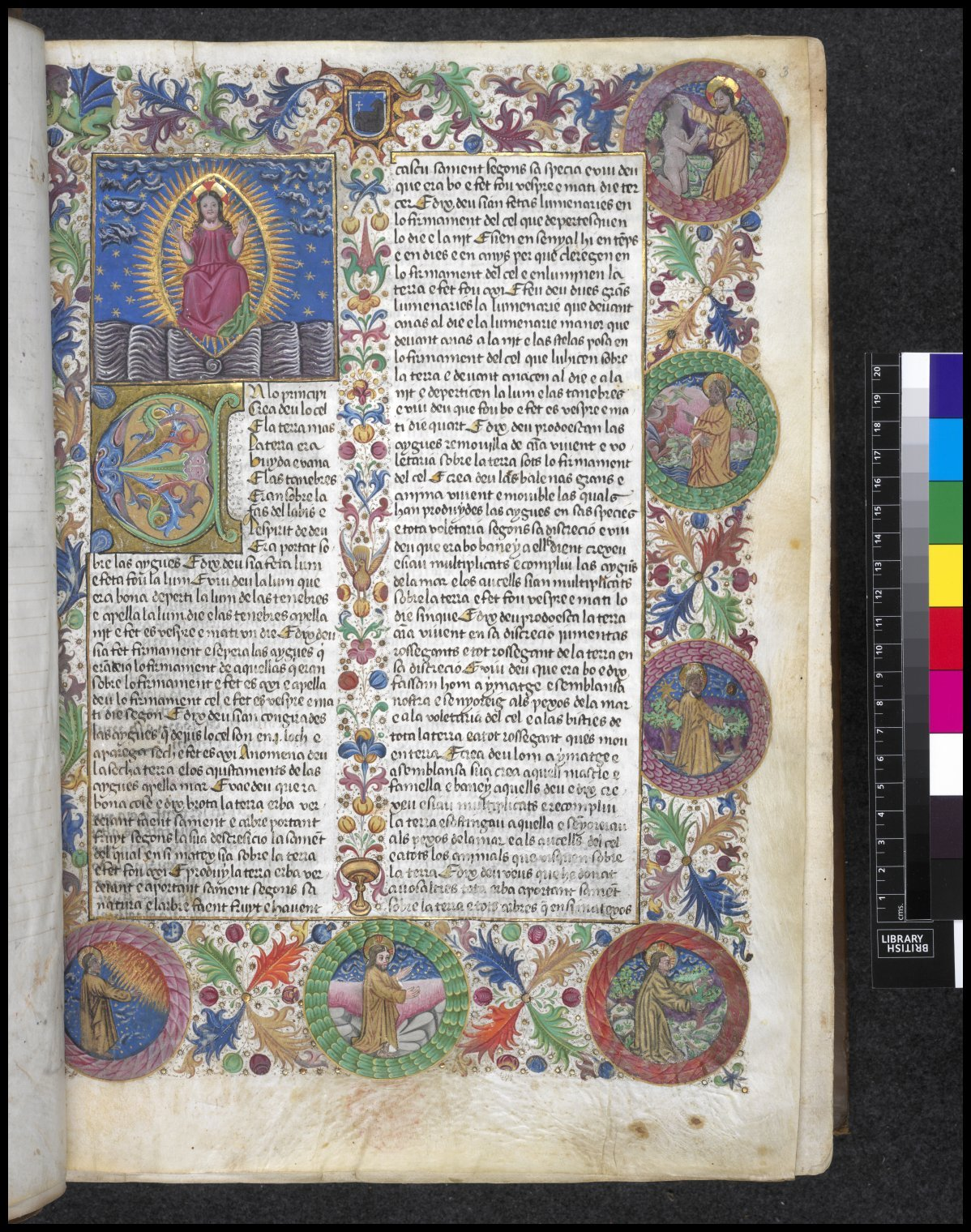
A medieval copy of the Old Testament in Catalan.

The first complete Catalan Bible translation was produced by the Catholic Church, between 1287 and 1290. It was entrusted to Jaume de Montjuich by Alfonso II of Aragon. Remains of this version can be found in Paris (Bibliothèque Nationale).

In the early fifteenth century, the Bible was translated into Catalan again by Bonifaci Ferrer. Ferrer's translation, known as the Valencian Bible, was printed in 1478 before any Bible was printed in English or Spanish. The prohibition, in Spain and other Catholic countries, of vernacular translations, along with the decline of the Catalan language until its renaissance in the nineteenth century, explains why there were no translations into Catalan from the sixteenth to the nineteenth century.

In 1832 a Catalan exile in London, Josep Melcior Prat i Colom, sponsored by the British and Foreign Bible Society, translated the New Testament, which was published afterwards in 1836 in Barcelona and again in 1888 in Madrid as the (Lo Nou Testament de nostre Senyor Jesu-Christ).

== List of Bible translators ==
- Jaume de Montjuich, 13th century
- Bonifaci Ferrer (Valencia 1350-1417), 1478
- Joan Roís de Corella, 15th century psalter
- Josep Melcior Prat i Colom (1779-1855)
- Pau and Samuel Sais, 2000

== 20th century to present ==
In the twentieth century many new translations emerged, both Catholic and Protestant.

=== Catholic translations ===
- 1915-1925 Unfinished translation by Frederic Clascar (Barcelona: Institut d'Estudis Catalans): only Genesis (1915), Song of Songs (1918) and Exodus (1925)
- 1928-1929 El Nou Testament (Barcelona: Foment de Pietat Catalana)
- 1928-1948 La Sagrada Bíblia, by Fundació Bíblica Catalana (Barcelona: Alpha); started in 1927 (published in 15 individual volumes, also known as "Bíblia de Cambó", as it was funded by Francesc Cambó). There are several translators, among them: Carles Riba, Carles Cardó or Josep Maria Millàs i Vallicrosa.
- 1926-1987 La Bíblia: versió dels textos originals i notes pels Monjos de Montserrat: by the Monks of Montserrat, in 28 volumes. Other editions based on it have been published, in one volume and with some textual variations
- 1968 La Sagrada Bíblia, 2nd Edition: a new translation in one volume, reprinted some times by Fundació Bíblica Catalana. It is a different translation from the 1928-1948 version from the same publisher.
- 1980 Nou Testament (Barcelona: Claret), by Jaume Sidera i Plana

=== Protestant translations ===
- 1988 Nou Testament: the New Testament, by the Institució Bíblica Evangèlica de Catalunya, with the help of the International Bible Society
- 2000 La Bíblia: la Sagrada Escriptura en llengua catalana; also La Bíblia del 2000or Bíblia Evangèlica Catalana (BEC), translated by Pau Sais and Samuel Sais ([Barcelona]: Institució Bíblica Evangèlica de Catalunya), with some editions
- 2009 La Santa bíblia o les Santes Escriptures (London: Trinitarian Bible Society), from the Massoretic text

=== Ecumenical translation ===
For the Ecumenical translation, Catholic and Protestant translators worked together. However, two separate translations of the Bible still emerged- the Catholic edition included deuterocanonical texts, while the Protestant edition did not.

- 1993 Bíblia Catalana Interconfessional (BCI), by Associació Bíblica de Catalunya, Editorial Claret, and Societats Bíbliques Unides, with some reprints.
- 2004 Evangelis: de Marc, Mateu, Lluc i Joan, amb els fets dels Apòstols, la Carta de Pau als romans i el LLibre de L'Apocalipsi (Barcelona: Proa), translated by Joan F. Mira in a literary and philological way, religiously neutral.

=== Jehovah's Witnesses ===
- 2016 Traducció del Nou Món de les Escriptures Gregues Cristianes (Selters, Germany).

== Comparison ==
Translation	Genesis 1:1–3	John 3:16
Bíblia Catalana Interconfessional (BCI)	Al principi, Déu va crear el cel i la terra. La terra era caòtica i desolada, les tenebres cobrien la superfície de l'oceà, i l'Esperit de Déu planava sobre les aigües. Déu digué: -Que existeixi la llum. I la llum va existir.	Déu ha estimat tant el món que ha donat el seu Fill únic perquè no es perdi cap dels qui creuen en ell, sinó que tinguin vida eterna.
Bíblia Evangèlica Catalana (BEC)	En el principi, Déu va crear el cel i la terra. La terra era caòtica i desolada, les tenebres cobrien la superfície de l'abisme i l'esperit de Déu planava per damunt les aigües. I Déu digué: "Que hi hagi llum"; i hi hagué llum.	Ja que Déu ha estimat tant el món, que ha donat el seu Fill únic perquè tot el qui creu en ell no es perdi, sinó que tingui vida eterna.
Bíblia dels monjos de Montserrat (1926-1982)	Al principi, Déu creà el cel i la terra. La terra era caòtica i desolada, les tenebres cobrien l'oceà i l'esperit de Déu batia les ales sobre l'aigua. Déu digué: «Que hi hagi llum». I hi hagué llum.	Perquè tant va estimar Déu el món, que va donar el seu Fill unigènit perquè tot el qui creu en ell no es perdi, sinó que tingui la vida eterna.
Bíblia de la Fundació Bíblica Catalana, 1st ed. (1928-1948)	En el principi creà Déu el cel i la terra. I la terra era vastitud i buidor, i la tenebra era damunt la faç de l'abisme, i l'esperit de Déu planava damunt la faç de les aigües. I digué Déu: «Sia llum». I llum fou.	Car tant estimà Déu el món, que donà el Fill unigènit, a fi que tot el qui creu en ell no es perdi, ans tingui vida eterna.
Evangelis by Joan F. Mira (2004)		Déu, en efecte, estimà el món de tal manera que li va donar el seu fill únic, a fi que tots els qui confien en ell no desapareguen sinó que tinguen una vida sense fi.
El Gènesi by Frederic Clascar (1915)	Al començament creà Déu el cel i la terra. I la terra era deserta i buida. I la tenebra era damunt la faç de l'abís. I l'esperit de Déu s'estenia damunt la faç de les aigües. I digué Déu: «Sia la llum». I la llum fou.	
