= Targum Pseudo-Jonathan =

Western targum of the Torah

Targum Pseudo-Jonathan (also known as the Jerusalem Targum, Targum Yerushalmi, or Targum Jonathan) is an Aramaic translation and interpretation (targum) of the Torah (Pentateuch) traditionally thought to have originated from the land of Israel, although more recently a provenance in 12th-century Italy has been proposed.

As a targum, it is not just a translation but incorporates aggadic material collected from various sources as late as the Midrash Rabbah as well as earlier material from the Talmud. So it is a combination of a commentary and a translation. It is also a composite text, involving the Old Judean Targum, Targum Onkelos, and a diverse array of other material.

It is not to be confused with "Targum Jonathan".

== Name ==
The original name of Targum Pseudo-Jonathan was Targum Yerushalmi (Jerusalem Targum). However, due to an error in the fourteenth century, it came to be known as the Targum "Jonathan" instead of "Jerusalem" in reference to Jonathan ben Uzziel. Due to the pseudonymous nature of this attribution, it is now also referred to as the Targum Pseudo-Jonathan, although this is variously abbreviated as TPsJ or TgPsJ. There are editions of the Pentateuch that continue to call it Targum Jonathan to this day.

== Authorship ==
The Babylonian Talmud, Megillah 3a, relates that Jonathan ben Uzziel, a student of Hillel the Elder, fashioned an Aramaic translation of the Nevi'im. It makes no mention of any translation by him of the Torah. Scholars agree that this Targum was not authored by him; Azariah dei Rossi (d. 1578) reported he saw two very similar complete Targumim to the Torah, one called Targum Yonatan Ben Uziel and the other called Targum Yerushalmi "Jerusalmite Targum". A standard explanation is that the original title of this work was Targum Yerushalmi, which was abbreviated to ת"י "TY", and these initials were then incorrectly expanded as Targum Yonatan, which was then further incorrectly expanded to Targum Yonatan ben Uziel. For these reasons, scholars call it "Targum Pseudo-Jonathan".

== Manuscripts ==
TPsJ is known from two extant sources. One is a 16th-century Italian manuscript called British Museum Add. 27031, stored at the British Museum in London. This manuscript was first published by Moshe Ginsburger in 1903. Due to the many errors in Ginsburger's edition, Rieder published a new edition of this manuscript in 1973. This manuscript bears the date 1598, though was written earlier, and was transcribed in an Italian hand. The second is the Venice edition first printed in 1591. They were previously known to dei Rossi, who discussed them in his work Meʾor ʿEynayim ("The Light of the Eyes", 1573–1575).

== Date ==
=== Range of possible dates ===
Earlier scholarship once posited that the TPsJ dated to the first century or earlier, although this approach has been widely abandoned. The Aramaic dialect used is late and TPsJ is likely the latest of the Pentateuchal Targums. Today, a wide variety of dates have been proposed for Targum Pseudo-Jonathan, ranging from the 4th to 12th centuries, although most date it to after the Islamic conquests and the upper boundary for the date of the text is the 13th century due to its citation in material from that time, specifically its repeated reference by Menahem Recanati (1250–1310, Papal State of Marche) in his Perush ʿAl ha-Torah.

Earlier citations to the TPsJ are not known, and none exist in the works of Nathan ben Jehiel of Rome, who otherwise frequently cited the Palestinian Targums. A small number of academics in recent times have continued to date the TPsJ prior to the early Muslim conquests, including Robert Hayward, Paul V M Flesher, and Beverly Mortensen, who place the text between the late fourth century to the early fifth century.

=== Terminus post quem ===
A lower boundary for the date of TPsJ is given by references to certain external events, activities, and people. For example, TPsJ describes the six orders of the Mishnah, and the Mishnah dates to around 200. References can also be found to the city of Constantinople which was constructed in 324–330. Later still, the rendering of Genesis 21:21 in the TPsJ contains a polemic reducing the status of Ishmael and against Khadija (called Adisha in the text), the first wife of Muhammad, and a daughter of theirs named Fatima. As such, the current form of the targum must date to the mid-7th century at the earliest, although some argue that this material was inserted into an earlier core of the TPsJ at a later date with respect to its original composition.

=== Recent views ===
Paul Flesher and Bruce Chilton have argued that all three major Targums, including Pseudo-Jonathan, should date to the fifth century or earlier because of a lack of Arabic loanwords, for one, and that the Jerusalem Talmud describes a variant containing an expansion of Leviticus 22:28 in y. Ber. 5.3 (9c) whose only similar witness is in the TPsJ. More specifically, this expansion includes the phrase 'My people, children of Israel' (Biblical Hebrew: עמי בני ישראל), which is known from the Targum Neofiti and documents in the Cairo Geniza, as well as the phrase 'As I am merciful in heaven, so shall you be merciful on earth', only found in TPsJ. Flesher and Chilton take this to imply that the Jerusalem Talmud, which reached its form by the first half of the fifth century, has cited the TPsJ. However, Leeor Gottlieb has retorted that this only provides evidence for the presence of a tradition acting as the common source for the Jerusalem Talmud and TPsJ Lev. 22:28. Instead, Gottlieb dates the TPsJ to the end of the 12th century in Italy on the basis of a textual relationship with a 12th-century Hebrew lexicon which Gottlieb argues has priority over it.

Independently, Gavin McDowell reached the same conclusion as Gottlieb, both for a provenance in the 12th century and for Italian origins, on the basis of his renewed argument for dependence of the TPsJ on the Pirkei De-Rabbi Eliezer composed in the 9th century, as well as the Chronicle of Moses dating to the 11th century. According to McDowell, a 12th-century Italian provenance also explains the absence of Arabic loanwords, which is sometimes used to argue for an early date.

==== Enochian traditions ====
McDowell also notes that both the Pirkei De-Rabbi Eliezer and TPsJ contain ancient traditions regarding Enoch and the fallen angels. Yet certain aspects of these traditions, such as the identification of Enoch with Metatron, are only found in TPsJ, while absent in Pirkei De-Rabbi Eliezer. The Enoch as Metatron reference is not found in the earliest Enochian texts, the Book of Enoch and the Book of Jubilees, for example, but rather in the later Enochian texts such as 2 Enoch, where it starts with titles such as "the Youth," "the Prince of the Presence," and "the Measurer"; 'Metatron' is named so explicitly in 3 Enoch.

Another ancient tradition regarding Enoch is the naming of the angels Shemhazai and Azael as the leaders of the Watchers. McDowell notes that these names are again found in TPsJ, whereas they are absent in the Pirkei De-Rabbi Eliezer. Yet here McDowell's argument is somewhat weakened by the fact that these names probably go back all the way to the earliest parts of the Book of Enoch, dating as early as the 3rd century BCE, and are also attested in two Dead Sea Scrolls texts. So this again seems to indicate that Targum Pseudo-Jonathan is a composite text, and it contains some materials that are very early, along with some later additions.
