= José Faur =

Argentine talmud researcher

José Faur (Hebrew: חכם יוסף פאור הלוי Ḥāḵām Yōsēf Fawr Hallēwī; 1934 – June 9, 2020) was a Sephardic Hakham (rabbi), teacher and scholar. He was a Rabbi in the Syrian-Jewish community in Brooklyn for many years. He was also a professor at the Jewish Theological Seminary of America, the Spertus Institute for Jewish Learning and Leadership, and Bar Ilan University, and was Professor of Law at Netanya Academic College.

== Biography ==
José Faur was born and raised in Buenos Aires, Argentina and belonged to the Damascene Syrian Jewish community of that city. He was tutored in Jewish subjects by several Sephardic Rabbis specially hired by his parents to this end. Eliahu Freue, cited by Faur as his principal teacher, was the spiritual head of the Damascus community in Argentina and taught Faur the fundamentals of Talmud, Jewish law and rabbinics. Other teachers included hakhamim Eliahu Suli, Jamil Harari and Aharon Cohen.

Faur credits these rabbis for providing him with an outstanding Jewish education.

"They never assumed an arrogant attitude toward their students or anyone else. They were accessible to all and encouraged contrary views and free discussion. The truth was the result of a collective effort in which everyone had equal access and share, rather than being imposed by an individual of a superior mind. Following Sephardic educational tradition, the teaching was methodical and comprehensive. Before one began to study the Talmud, it was expected of him to have a solid knowledge of the scripture, Mishnayot, the famous anthology Eyn Yaaqov, the Shulhan Arukh and other basic Jewish texts."

José Faur married Esther Cohen in February 1963. They had three children: Aura, Abe and Miriam. His son Abe continued in his father’s footsteps and also earned his Rabbinic degree.

He died in Netanya, Israel on the 9th of June 2020 at the age of 86.

== Education ==
In 1955, in his late teens, Hakham Faur was accepted to the Beth Medrash Govoha in Lakewood, New Jersey. The institution was founded and run by the Lithuanian Talmudist, Rabbi Aharon Kotler.

Faur reminisces about his time at the Yeshiva:

"The first lesson I heard by Rabbi Kotler sounded like a revelation. He spoke rapidly, in Yiddish, a language I didn't know but was able to understand because I knew German. He quoted a large number of sources from all over the Talmud, linking them in different arrangements and showing the various interpretations and interconnection of later Rabbinic authorities. I was dazzled. Never before had I been exposed to such an array of sources and interconnections. Nevertheless there were some points that didn't jibe. I approached R' Kotler to discuss the lesson. He was surprised that I had been able to follow. When I presented my objections to him, he reflected for a moment and then replied that he would give a follow-up lesson where these difficulties would be examined. This gave me an instant reputation as some sort of genius (iluy), and after a short while, I was accepted into the inner elite group.

My years in Lakewood were pleasurable and profitable.... At the same time the lessons of Rabbi Kotler and my contacts with fellow students were making me aware of some basic methodological flaws in their approach. The desire to shortcut their way into the Talmud without a systematic and methodological knowledge of basic Jewish texts made their analysis skimpy and haphazard...The dialectics that were being applied to the study of Talmud were not only making shambles out of the text, but, what was more disturbing to me, they were also depriving the very concept of Jewish law, Halacha, of all meaning. Since everything could be "proven" and "disproven", there were no absolute categories of right and wrong. Accordingly, the only possibility of morality is for the faithful to surrender himself to an assigned superior authority; it is the faithful's duty to obey this authority simply because it is the authority and because he is faithful. More precisely, devotion is not to be measured by an objective halakha (it has been destroyed by dialectics) but by obedience. Within this system of morality there was no uniform duty. It was the privilege of the authority to make special dispensations and allowances (hetarim) to some of the faithful; conversely, the authority could impose some new obligation and duties on all or a part of the faithful."

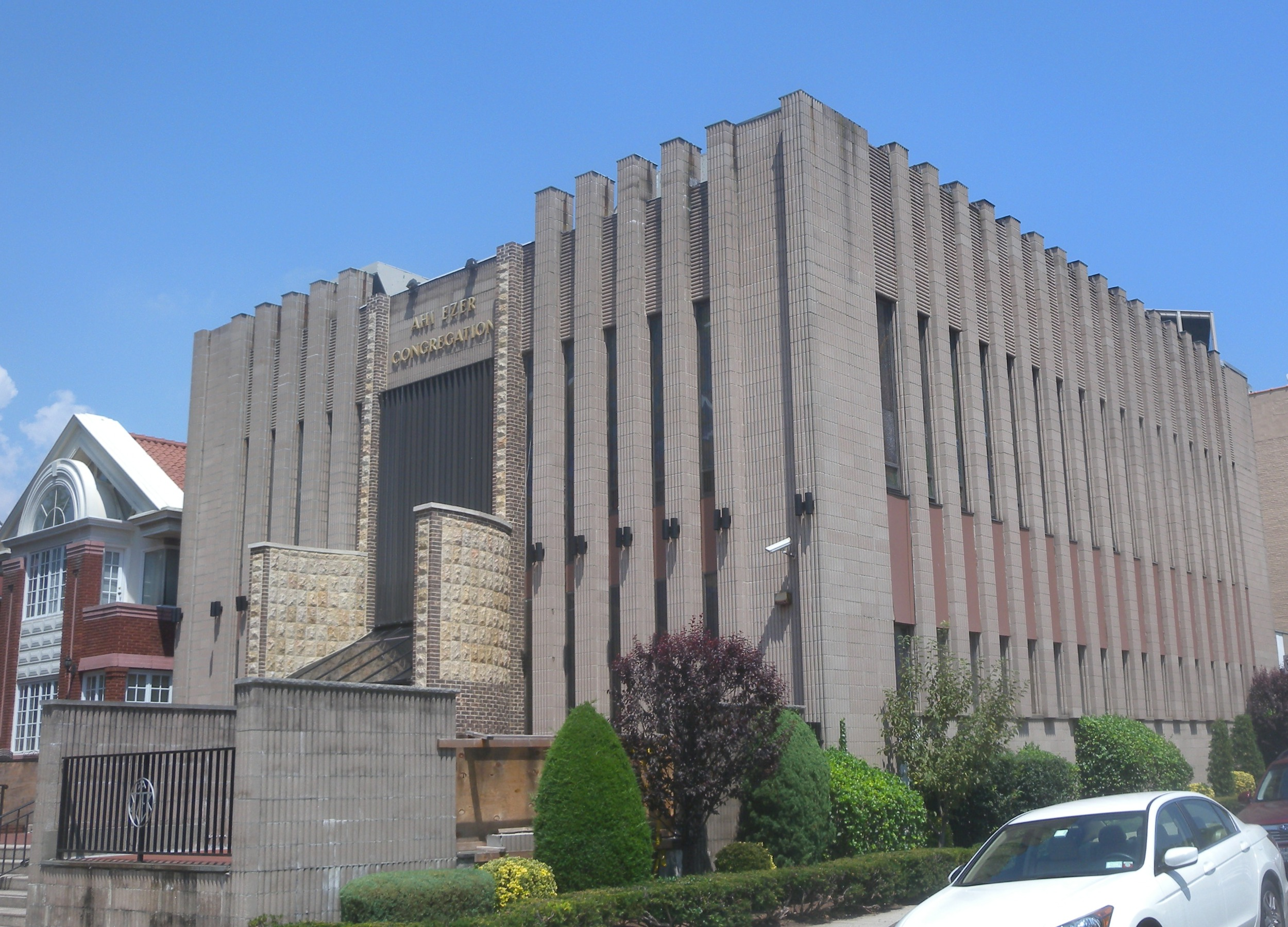
Ahi Ezer, Brooklyn

This approach seemed to Faur to be at odds with the approach upon which he was reared in Argentina. It was here that Hakham Faur first met and befriended Shlomo Carlebach.

Rabbi Faur left the yeshiva with a view to fortifying his knowledge of Tora with an academic background. With this in mind, he chose to study Semitic Philology accompanied by George Lasry. They were the first Jews to be accepted at the University of Barcelona since the Jews were expelled from Spain in 1492 during the Spanish Inquisition. It was during Faur's time at Harvard University that Harry Austryn Wolfson persuaded Faur to inquire about the department of Semitic Philology at the University of Barcelona, where Faur studied under Josep Maria Millàs Vallicrosa and Alexandro Díez Macho. Faur and Lasry graduated in 1961, Faur with a degree in Semitic Philology and an M.A. in Semitic Languages; the title of his master's thesis was "La Espiritualidad Judia," a basic explanation of Jewish spirituality. In 1963, Faur received his Semicha (contemporary rabbinic ordination) from hakham Suleiman Haggai Abadi, head of the Beth Din (Jewish court) of Jerusalem. Meanwhile, Faur completed his doctorate in Semitic Languages (which he received in 1964), writing a thesis on "The Masorah to the Targum Onqelos." Later that year he left Spain to participate in a three-year fellowship at the Jewish Theological Seminary in New York, under the supervision of the eminent professor of Talmud, Saul Lieberman. In 1966, Faur was ordained as a dayyan (judge) in Family Law (Even Ha'ezer) by hakham Matloub Abadi, and was further ordained as a dayyan by hakham Suleiman Haggai Abadi in 1968, this time in Civil Law (Choshen Mishpat).

== Rabbinic career ==
Hakham Faur began teaching at the Sephardic Ahi Ezer Congregation and opened a Yeshiva in Brooklyn NY. During this time, he brought many people back to halakhic observance and created a renaissance in the learning of Tora in accordance with the Sephardic traditions. Ralph Betesh, later one of the leaders of the Jewish community, recounts how for the first time, people heard of great Sephardic luminaries such as Don Isaac Abarbanel, R. Bachya ibn Pakuda and R. Moshe Hefez. Rabbi Faur's influence in bringing the younger generation back to the traditions of Halakha and Tora was very substantial and many of the community's lay and religious leaders were his students (or students of students), among them Dennis Dweck, Rabbi Moshe Shamah and Mickey Kairey. In the biography of Nouri Dayyan entitled, 'Nouri: The Story of Isidore Dayan', by Devorah Glicksman (2016), a character by the name of Kohelet Ovadia, may have been intended to represent Rabbi Faur during this period.

In 1967, on the advice of hakhamim David de Sola Pool and Matloub Abadi, a leader of the Syrian Jewish community of Brooklyn, originally from Aleppo (Halab), Faur accepted a faculty position at the Jewish Theological Seminary of America in New York City, where he developed a close relationship with Abraham Joshua Heschel, professor of Jewish Ethics and Mysticism. Faur left the school in 1985, when the Graduate Rabbinical School began admitting women. Rabbi Faur later sued for breach of contract, arguing that by admitting women in such a manner, the seminary was in effect forcing him to resign.

Rabbi Faur received the support of the chief rabbi of the Syrian Jewish community in Brooklyn, Jacob Kassin, who signed an open letter attesting to Rabbi Faur's religious standing.

In the summer of 1987, the Sephardic chief rabbi of Jerusalem, hakham Shalom Messas, convened a Beth Din which examined various allegations against Rabbi Faur. These allegations were later formulated in a letter, and in an ad in the Haredi weekly, Yated Neeman on February 8, 1988, in protest of his appointment as rabbi to the Syrian Congregation Shaare Zion in New York City. The letter criticised Rabbi Faur for teaching at a Conservative seminary, charged that “his books emit an odor of Heresy,” argued that he was controversial, accusing him of "speaking improperly about great medieval Ashkenazic sages" and asserted that he was “a threat to the purity of faith and religion in the congregation.” The declaration was signed by seventeen Rabbis. The Beth Din came to the conclusion that he was innocent of all charges. Chief Sephardic Rabbi Mordechai Eliyahu later affirmed the decision as well. After the controversy ended Rabbi Mordechai Eliyahu stated about the incident: ‘the greatest Sephardic Hakham living in the US today is Rabbi Faur.’

In 1987, Faur took a position as the Ezra Sensibar Visiting Professor at the Spertus Institute for Jewish Learning and Leadership in Chicago, where he taught until 1993. Faur went on to teach Talmud part-time at Bar Ilan University in Ramat Gan, Israel, until 2003. From 1996 until 2007, Faur also taught law at Netanya Academic College, which was founded in 1994 by a team from Bar Ilan University in Netanya, Israel.

In Israel he dedicated himself to teaching and writing and occasionally taught in Sephardic communities; he was invited as a guest speaker by rabbis such as R. David Sheloush, the then chief rabbi of Netanya, and R. Ezra Bar-Shalom, who then resided in Ramat Aviv.

== Published works ==
Faur wrote nine books and over 100 essays and articles on a wide variety of subjects, ranging from linguistics to historiography to rabbinic law.

=== Books ===
- The Gospel According to The Jews, Moreshet Sepharad Publishing (November 16, 2012)
- The Naked Crowd: The Jewish Alternative to Cunning Humanity, Fort Lee: Derusha Publishing (September 2009)
- The Horizontal Society: Understanding the Covenant and Alphabetic Judaism (2 vol.), Boston: Academic Studies Press (June 15, 2008)
- Homo Mysticus: A Guide to Maimonides's Guide for the Perplexed, Syracuse: Syracuse University Press (April 1998)
- In the Shadow of History: Iberian Jews and Conversos at the Dawn of Modernity, Albany: State University of New York Press (February 1992)
- Golden Doves With Silver Dots: Semiotics and Textuality in Rabbinic Tradition, Bloomington: Indiana University Press (June 1986).
  - Translation into Serbian by Ermoza Bahar, Zlatne Golubice sa Srebrnim Tackama, Zemun: Knjizevno Drustvo Pismo (2002)
- Studies in the Mishne Tora (in Hebrew), Jerusalem: Mossad Harav Kook (June 1978)
- R. Israel Moshe Hazzan: The Man and His Works (in Hebrew), Haifa: Academic Publications (1977)
- La Espiritualidad Judía (in Spanish), Universidad Pontificia de Salamanca (1960)

=== Articles ===
- "Alepo, Códice de," Enciclopedia de la Biblia vol. 1 (Barcelona, 1961), 321-332.
- "Hilkhot Shehita le-Rab Yehudai Gaon," Talpioth 9 (1965), 194-217.
- "Tosafot Ha-Rosh le Pereq Ha-Maddir," Sinai 57 (1965), 18-42.
- "Tosafot Ha-Rosh le-Massekhet Berakhot," Proceedings of the American Academy for Jewish Research 33 (1965), 1-25.
- "Samkhut Maran esel ha-Posqim ha-Sefaradim," Sinai 59 (1966) 159-166.
- "Hilufe Otiyot Alef be-Yod ba-masora le-Targum Onqelos," Peraqim 4 (1966), 93-97.
- "Ha-Messora le-Targum Onqelos," Sinai 60 (1967), 17-28.
- "Reshima meha-Otiyot ha-Gedolot veha-Qetanot sheba-Miqra meha-Geniza ha-Qahirit," Proceedings of the American Academy for Jewish Research 35, (1967), 1-10.
- "Hiddushim le-Seder Zera'im me-Ketibat Yad ha-Rab Mordekhai Romano," Sinai 60, (1967), 218-224.
- "La doctrina de la ley natural en el pensamiento Judío del medioevo," Sefarad 27 (1967), 218-224.
- "Understanding the Covenant," Tradition 9 (1968), 33-55.
- "'Iyyunim be-Hilkhot Teshuba le-Harambam," Sinai 61 (1969), 259-266.
- "Meqor Hiyyuban shel ha-Misvot le-Da'at ha-Rambam," Tarbiẕ 38 (1969), 43-53.
- "The Origin of the Distinction between Rational and Divine Commandments in Medieval Jewish Philosophy," Augustinaum 9 (1969), 298-304.
- "Yahas Hakhme ha-Sefaradim le-Samkhut Maran ke-Poseq," Rabbi Yosef Caro (Jerusalem: Mossad Harav Kook, 1970), pp. 189–197.
- "Reflections on Job and Situation Morality," Judaism (1970), 219-225.
- "Ha-'Aboda Zara ba-Miqra le-Or ha-meqorot ha-Eliliyim," Hagut 'Ibrit be-America vol. 1 (Tel Aviv: Berit 'Ibrit 'Olamit, 1972), pp. 87–100.
- "De-Oraita, de-Rabbanan ve-Dinim Muflaim be-Mishnato shel ha-Rambam, Sinai 67 (1972), 20-35.
- "The Sephardim: Yesterday, Today, and Tomorrow," The Sephardic World (Summer 1972), 5-9.
- "Law and Justice in Rabbinic Jurisprudence," Samuel K. Mirsky Memorial Volume (New York: Yeshiva University, 1972), pp. 13–20.
- "A Sense of Language," The Sephardic World (Winter 1973), 25-31.
- "Intuitive Knowledge of God: A Study in Intercultural Ideas between Islam, Karaism, and Rabbanaite Judaism," Ben Zvi Institute (Jerusalem, 1974).
- "Introducing the Materials of Sephardic Culture to Contemporary Jewish Studies," American Jewish Historical Quarterly 63 (1974), 340-349.
- "Hora'at Ha-Miqra ba-Qehilot Ha-Sefardiyot," Sheviley Hahinuch 35 (1974), 42-46.
- "R. Yisrael Moshe Hazzan," Ha-Doar 54 (1975), 189-192.
- "Abraham de Boton," Ha-Doar 54 (1975), 266.
- "Ma Ben Hamor Ze Le-Hamor Ha-Hu," Sinai 76 (1975), 189-192.
- "Hora'at Ha-Talmud Ba-Massoret Ha-Hinukhit Ha-Sefardit," Sheviley Hahinuch 35 (1975) 177-188.
- "Idolatry," Encyclopaedia Judaica 8 (1973), 1227-1232. Reprinted in Jewish Values (Israel Pocket Library, 1974), 52-60.
- "The Legal Thinking of the Tosafot: A Historical Approach," Dine Israel 6 (1975), 43-72.
- "Sefer Ha-Yobel Li-khbod Professor Baron: Heleq Ha-'Ibri," Ha-Doar 54 (1975), 511-512.
- "Sefer Ha-Yobel Li-khbod Professor Baron: Heleq Ha-Lo'azi," Ha-Doar 54 (1975), 567-568.
- "Early Zionist Ideals Among Sepharadim in the Nineteenth Century," Judaism 25 (1976), 54-64.
- "The Targumim and Halakha," Jewish Quarterly Review 66 (1976), 19-26.
- "Tehiyat Ha-Lashon Ha-'Ibrit esel Ha-Yehudim Ha-Sefaradim," Ha-Doar 55 (1976), 56-57.
- "The Character of the Sephardic Culture," Jewish Spectator (Spring 1976), 33-35.
- "Some General Observations on the Character of Classical Jewish Literature," Journal of Jewish Studies 28 (1977), 30-45.
- "Sephardim in the Nineteenth Century: New Directions and Old Values," Proceedings of the American Academy for Jewish Research 44 (1977), 29-52.
- "Intuitive Knowledge of God in Medieval Jewish Theology," Jewish Quarterly Review 67 (1976–1977), 90-110.
- "Sekhar Ha-Rofe Ba-Halakha," Dine Israel 7 (1977), 1-25. Reprinted in French: "Le droit du medecin de percevoir un salaire dans la tradition juive, " Pardes, 8 (1988), 73-92.
- "Vico, Religious Humanism and the Sephardic Tradition," Judaism 27 (1978), 63-71. Spanish translation in: "Vico el Humanismo Religioso y la Tradición Sefardita," Cuadernos sobre Vico 7 (1997), 255-264.
- "Lessons for our day from Sephardic Halakhic Sources," Proceedings of the Rabbinical Assembly 1978, 57-73. Translated in Italian: "Lezioni per il Nostro Tempo dalle Fonti Halachiche Sefardite," Rassegna Mensile di Israel, 1983 (August), 581-600.
- "The Biblical Idea of Idolatry," Jewish Quarterly Review 69 (1978), 1-26.
- "The Hebrew Personal Pronoun," Perspectives on Jews and Judaism (New York: Rabbinical Assembly, (1979), pp. 45–59.
- "The Inclusion of a Sefardi Dimension in American Jewish Education," Annual Workshop on New Directions in Jewish Education (Proceedings: March 13, 1971). Enlarged Version in ed. Jane S. Gerber, Sephardic Studies in the University (Madison, N. J.: Fairleigh Dickinson University Press, 1996), pp. 19–28.
- "On Studying Torah: An Apology," Ikka D'Amre 7 (May 1979), 12-18.
- "The Third Person in Semitic Grammatical Theory and General Linguistics," Linguistica Biblica, Bonn, 46 (1979), 106-113.
- "The Fundamental Principles of Jewish Jurisprudence," The Journal of International Law and Politics, New York University, 12 (1979).
- "Beyond Ordination: The Procedural Aspects," Sh'ma (Feb. 1980).
- "Yahas Megurashe Sefarad vese'esa'ehem le-mosdot Hinnukh,'" Shebet Va 'am (1980), 319-339.
- "Le Penseé Sepharade Moderne: Humanisme Religieux et Sionisme," Les Temps Modernes Paris (1980), 131-145.
- "Monotheism and Magic," Midstream Aug./Sept., 1980, 54-57.
- "Modern Sephardic Thought: Religious Humanism and Zionism,"The Sephardi and Oriental Jewish Heritage (1982), pp. 325-349.
- "Maimonides on Freedom and Language," Helios 9 (1982), 73-94.
- "David Nassy: on Prejudice and Related Matters," Neveh Ya'akov, Jubilee Volume Presented to Dr. Jaap Meijer (The Netherlands: Van Gorcum, 1982), pp. 87–116.
- "Freedom and Linguistic Expression in Maimonides," Semiotica 46 (1983), 61-77.
- "El Antisemitismo en la Mente Sefaradí," Rassegna Mensile di Israel 1983 (August), 394-418.
- "The Splitting of the Logos: Some Remarks on Vico and Rabbinic Tradition," New Vico Studies 3 (1985), 85-103. Reprinted in: Salvación en la Palabra: Homenaje al Profesor Alejandro Díez Macho (Madrid: Ediciones Cristiandad, 1985), 717-733. Spanish translation: "La Ruptura del Logos: Algunas Observaciones sobre Vico y la Tradición Rabínica," Cuadernos sobre Vico 7 (1997), pp. 265–278.
- "Delocutive Expressions in the Hebrew Liturgy," Ancient Studies in Memory of Elias Bickerman (The Journal of the Ancient Near Eastern Society) 16-17 (1984–1985), pp. 41–54.
- 'Aliyyat Qatan li-Qro ba-Tora," Studies in Memory of the Rishon le-Zion R. Y. Nissim, vol. 1 (Jerusalem: Yad ha-Rab Nissim, 5745/1985).
- "La guida degli smarriti: che cosa significa?" La Rassegna Mensile di Israel 52 (1986), 230-232.
- "Safeq Berakhot le-Haqel: Kelal she-Teba'a Ha-Rambam," Asufot 1 (1987), pp. 343–359.
- "Reading Jewish Texts with Greek Eyes," Sh'ma 18/342 (November 27, 1987), 10-12.
- "Francisco Sánchez's Theory of Cognition and Vico's verum/factum," New Vico Studies 5 (1987), 131-146. Spanish translation: "La Teoría del Conocimiento de Francisco Sánchez y el verum/factum de Vico," Cuadernos Sobre Vico 4 (1994), pp. 83–99.
- "Tefillot Keneged Temidim Tiqqenum le-Da'at Ha-Rambam," Asufot 2 (1988), 157-176.
- "Concerning the Term 'Qore be-Iiggeret'" (Heb), Alei Sefer 15 (1988–89), 21-30.
- "God as a Writer: Omnipresence and the Art of Dissimulation," Religion and Intellectual Life 6 (1989), 31-43. Translated to Slavic: in Mezuza, Vol. 55 (Piograd: June 1998), 111-124.
- "Ha-Sugya ha-Kefula: le-Bi'ur ha-Sugya ha-Rishona be-Massekhet Shabbat," Asufot 3 (1989), 467-473.
- "De-authorization of the Law: Paul and the Oedipal Model," Journal of Psychiatry and the Humanities 11 (1989), 222-243. Translated into French: "Délégitimation de la Loi: Paul et le modèle oedipien," Pardès 27 (1999), 159-181.
- "Four Classes of Conversos: A Typological Study," Revue des Etudes Juives 149 (1990), 26-34.
- "Person and Subjectivity: A Linguistic Category," Mentalities 6 (1990), 15-18.
- "Signon ha-Mishna ve-ha-Shinnun be-'al-pe," Asufot 4 (1990), 12-31.
- "Newton, Maimonides, and Esoteric Knowledge," Cross Currents: Religious & Intellectual Life 8 (1990), 526-538.
- "Jewish and Western Historiographies: A Post-Modern Interpretation," Modern Judaism 12 (1992), 23-27.
- "The Jewish Mentality of Francisco Sánchez," Mentalities 7, (1992), 26-38.
- "Correlations: The Iberian and German Experiences," Midstream June–July, 1992, 20-22.
- "Two Models of Jewish Spirituality," Shofar 10 (1992), 5-46.
- "Leishev ba-Sukkah: Between Ashkenaz and Sepharad," Rabbinics Today 1 (October 1992), 5, 8.
- "Texte et société: histoire sociale du texte revele, " ed. Shmuel Trigano, La Société Juive a Travers les Ages vol. 1 (Paris: Librairie Fayard, 1992), pp. 43–113; notes pp. 691–705.
- "Imagination and Religious Pluralism: Maimonides, ibn Verga, and Vico," New Vico Studies 10 (1992), 36-51.
- "The Limits of Readerly Collusion in Rabbinic Tradition," Soundings 56 (1993), 153-161.
- "Law and Hermeneutics in Rabbinic Jurisprudence: A Maimonidean Perspective," Cardozo Law Review 14 (1993), 1657-1679.
- "Judaism and Monolingualism," Cardozo Law Review 14 (1993), 1713-1744.
- "Maimonides on Imagination: Towards a Theory of Jewish Aesthetics," The Solomon Goldman Lectures (The Spertus College of Judaica Press) 6 (1993), 89-104.
- "Sánchez' Critique of Authoritas: Converso Skepticism and the Emergence of Radical Hermeneutics," in ed. Peter Ochs, The Return to Scripture in Judaism and Christianity (New York: Paulist Press, 1993), pp. 256–276.
- "Maimonides' Water-Clock and its Epistemological Implications: Sánchez's modus sciendi and Vico's verum-factum," Jewish Responses to Early Modern Science (The Van Leer Institute, Jerusalem, May 15–18, 1995), pp. 176–185.
- " 'Al Girsa Ahat le-Masekhet Nidda Mi-Tqufat ha-Sbora'im," Tarbiz 65 (1996), 721 – 728.
- "The Character of Apophatic Knowledge in Maimonides' Guide," in ed. Dan Cohn-Sherbok Theodicy (Lewiston, New York: The Edwin Mellen Press, 1997), pp. 65–74.
- "A Crisis of Categories: Kabalah and the rise of Apostasy in Spain," in eds. Moshe Lazar and Stephen Haliczer, The Jews Of Spain and The Expulsion of 1492 (California: Labyrinthos, 1997), pp. 41–63.
- "Basic concepts in Rabbinic Hermeneutics," Shofar 16, (1997), 1-12.
- "The Hebrew Species Concept and the Origin of Evolution: R. Benamozegh's Response to Darwin," Rassegna Mensile di Israel 63 (1997), 43-66.
- "Le Juif unidimensional et le degré zéro du judaism," Pardès 25 (1998), pp. 113–127. Longer English version: "One-Dimensional Jew, Zero-Dimensional Judaism," Annual of Rabbinic Judaism, II (1999), pp. 31–50.
- "Ve-Nishu Hakhme Ummot ha-'Olam et Hakhme Yisrael," ) in eds. Chief Justice of Israel Supreme Court Aharon Barak and Professor Menashe Shawa, Minha Le-Yishaq (Jerusalem: Lishkat 'Orkhe-Din, 1999), pp. 113–133.
- "Jews, Conversos, and Native Americans: The Iberian Experience," Annual of Rabbinic Judaism III (2000), pp. 95–121.
- "Don Quichotte: un talmudiste au passé souillé," Pardes 29 (2000), 159-168. Enlarged English version: "Don Quixote: Talmudist and mucho más," The Review of Rabbinic Judaism 4 (2001), 139-157.
- "Performative and Descriptive Utterances in Jewish Law" (Heb.). In ed. Arye Edrei, Studies in Jewish Law in Honor of Professor Aaron Kirschenbaum (Dine Israel 20-21, 5760-5761), pp. 101–121.
- "Retórica y hemenéutica: Vico y la tradición rabínica," in ed. E. Hidalgo-Serna, et al., Pensar Para el Nuevo Siglo, vol. 3 (Napoli: La Cittá del Sole, 2001), pp. 917–938. English translation: "Rhethoric and Hermeneutics: Vico and Rabbinic Tradition," Moreshet Sepharad.
- "El pensamiento Sefardí frente a la ilustración Europea," in ed. Judit Targarona Borrás et al., Pensamiento y Mística Hispanojudía y Sefardí (Cuenca: Ediciones de la Universidad de Castilla-La Mancha), pp. 323–338.
- "Of Cultural Intimidation and Other Miscellanea: Bar-Sheshakh vs. Raba," Review of Rabbinic Judaism 5 (2002), 34-50.
- "Esoteric Knowledge and the Vulgar: Parallels between Newton and Maimonides," Trumah 12 (2002), 183-191.
- "Anti-Maimonidean Demons," Review of Rabbinic Judaism 6 (2003), pp. 3–52.
- "Newton, Maimonidean," Review of Rabbinic Judaism 6 (2003), 215-249.
- "Sir Isaac Newton—'a Judaic monotheist of the school of Maimonides,'" in ed. Gorge K. Hasselhoff and Otfried Fraisse, Moises Maimonides (Germany: Ergon Verlag, 2004), pp. 289–309.
- "The Status of Jewish Real Estate outside Israel's Territory," (Heb.), Law Review Netanya Academic College, vol. 4, 2005 (in Honour of Prof. Avner H. Shaki ), pp. 743–791.
- "Alphabetic Memory," Mentalities 19 (2005), pp. 21–25.
- "On Martyrdom in Jewish Law: Maimonides and Nahmanides," (Heb.), Annual of Bar-Ilan University, 30-13, 2006 (In Memory of Prof. Meyer Simcha Feldblum), pp. 373–408.
