= Targum =

Hebrew Bible translation into Aramaic by Jews

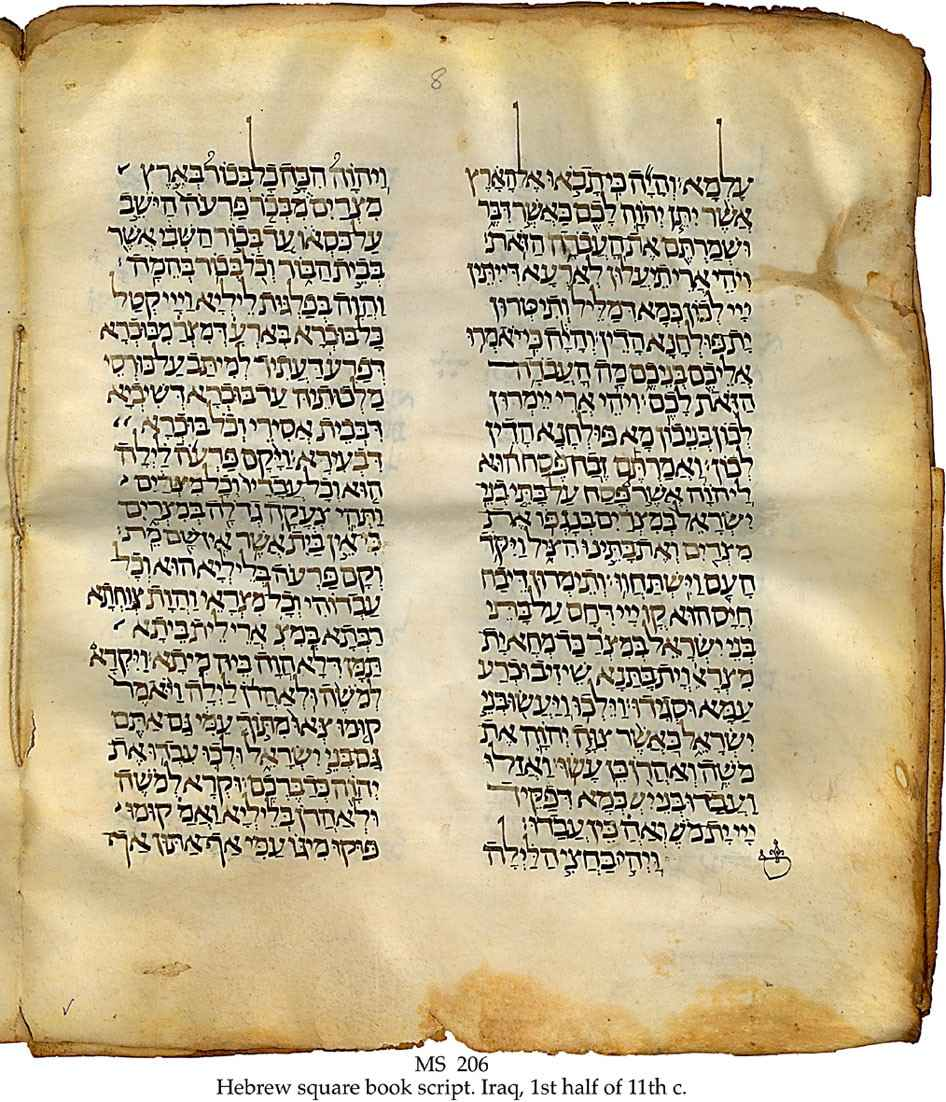
11th century Hebrew Bible with targum, perhaps from Tunisia, found in Iraq: part of the Schøyen Collection

A targum (Imperial Aramaic: תרגום, interpretation, translation, version; plural: targumim) was an originally spoken translation of the Hebrew Bible (Hebrew: תַּנַ״ךְ, Tanakh) that a professional Jewish translator (מְתוּרגְמָן mǝṯurgǝmān) would give in the common language of the listeners when that was not Biblical Hebrew. This had become necessary near the end of the first century BCE, in cases where the common language was Aramaic, while Hebrew was used chiefly for schooling and worship. The translator frequently expanded his translation with paraphrases, explanations and examples, so it became a kind of sermon.

Writing down the targum was initially prohibited; nevertheless, some targumitic writings appeared as early as the middle of the first century. They were not recognized as authoritative by the religious leaders. Some subsequent Jewish traditions, beginning with the Jews of Lower Mesopotamia, accepted the written targumim, what are now called Targum Onkelos and Targum Jonathan, as authoritative translations of the Hebrew scriptures into Aramaic. Today, the common meaning of targum is a written Aramaic translation of the Hebrew Bible. Only Yemenite Jews continue to use the targumim liturgically.

As translations, the targumim largely reflect midrashic interpretation of the Tanakh from the time they were written and are notable for favoring allegorical readings over anthropomorphisms. Maimonides, for one, notes this often in The Guide for the Perplexed. That is true both for those targums that are fairly literal as well as for those that contain many midrashic expansions. In 1541, Elia Levita wrote and published the Sefer Meturgeman, explaining all the Aramaic words found in the Targums Onqelos, Jonathan, and pseudo-Jonathan.

Targumim are used today as sources in text-critical editions of the Hebrew Bible (Biblia Hebraica Stuttgartensia refers to them with the abbreviation 𝔗).

== Etymology ==
The noun Targum is derived from the early semitic root תרגם (trgm) found in Hebrew, and the Akkadian term targummanu refers to "translator, interpreter". It occurs in Ezra 4:7 "a letter written in Aramaic and translated." Besides denoting the translations of the Hebrew Bible (Tanakh) into Aramaic by Jews, targum also denoted the oral rendering of Hebrew Bible lections in synagogue, while the Jewish translator was simply called hammeturgem (he who translates). Other than the meaning "translate", the verb tirgem also means "to explain". Targum refers to "translation" and argumentation or "explanation".

== Two major targumim ==
The two most important targumim for liturgical purposes are:

- Targum Onkelos on the Torah
- Targum Jonathan on the Nevi'im

These two targumim are mentioned in the Babylonian Talmud as targum dilan ("our Targum"), giving them official status. In the synagogues of Talmudic times, Targum Onkelos was read alternately with the Torah, verse by verse, and Targum Jonathan was read alternately with the selection from Nevi'im (i.e., the haftara), though in the case of Nevi'im it was permitted to translate in units of up to three verses. This custom continues today in Yemenite Jewish synagogues.

Besides its public function in the synagogue, the Babylonian Talmud also mentions targum in the context of a personal study requirement: "A person should always review his portions of scripture along with the community, reading the scripture twice and the targum once" (Berakhot 8a–b). This, too, refers to Targum Onkelos on the public Torah reading and to Targum Jonathan on the haftarot from Nevi'im.

Medieval manuscripts of the Tanakh’s Masoretic Text sometimes contain the Hebrew text interpolated, verse-by-verse, with the targumim. This scribal practice is rooted in the public reading of the Targum and the requirement for private study. In these manuscripts, and in rabbinic Hebrew Bibles up to and including the second printed Venice edition, Targumim were written or printed with cantillation marks.

The two "official" targumim are considered eastern (Mesopotamian, called "Babylonian"). Nevertheless, scholars believe they, too, originated in Syria Palestina because of a strong linguistic substratum of Jewish Palestinian Aramaic. Though these targumim were later "orientalised", the substratum belying their origins remains.

When most Jewish communities ceased speaking Aramaic in the 10th century, the public reading of Targum, along with the Torah and Haftarah, was abandoned in most communities, Yemen being a well-known exception.

The private study requirement to review the Targum was never entirely relaxed, even when Jewish communities had largely ceased speaking Aramaic, and the Targum never ceased to be a major source for Jewish exegesis. For instance, it serves as a major source in Shlomo Yitzhaki's Torah commentary, "Rashi," and has always been the standard fare for Ashkenazi Jews onward.

For these reasons, Jewish editions of the Tanakh which include commentaries still almost always print the Targum alongside the text, in all Jewish communities. Nevertheless, later halakhic authorities argued that the requirement to privately review the targum might also be met by reading a translation in the current vernacular in place of the official Targum, or else by studying an important commentary containing midrashic interpretation (especially that of Rashi).

== Targum Ketuvim ==
The Talmud explicitly states that no official targumim were composed besides these two on Torah and Nevi'im alone, and that there is no official targum to Ketuvim ("The Writings"). The Talmud stories state:

The Targum of the Pentateuch was composed by Onkelos the proselyte from the mouths of R. Eleazar and R. Joshua. The Targum of the Prophets was composed by Jonathan ben Uzziel under the guidance of Haggai, Zechariah and Malachi, and the land of Israel [thereupon] quaked over an area of four hundred parasangs by four hundred parasangs, and a Bath Kol (heavenly voice) came forth and exclaimed, "Who is this that has revealed My secrets to mankind?" Jonathan b. Uzziel arose and said, "It is I who have revealed Thy secrets to mankind. It is fully known to Thee that I have not done this for my own honour or for the honour of my father's house, but for Thy honour I have done it, that dissension may not increase in Israel." He further sought to reveal [by] a targum [the inner meaning] of Ketuvim, but a Bath Kol went forth and said, "Enough!" What was the reason? Because the date of the Messiah is foretold in it.

Nevertheless, most books of Ketuvim (with the exceptions of Daniel and Ezra-Nehemiah, which both contain Aramaic portions) have targumim, whose origin is mostly Palestinian rather than Mesopotamian. But they were poorly preserved and less well known for lack of a fixed place in the liturgy. From Palestine, the tradition of targum to Ketuvim made its way to Italy, and from there to medieval Ashkenaz and Sepharad. The targumim of Psalms, Proverbs, and Job are generally treated as a unit, as are the targumim of the five scrolls (Esther has a longer "Second Targum" as well.) The targum of Chronicles is quite late, possibly medieval. It is traditionally attributed to "Rav Yosef" (meaning either Rav Yosef or Rav Yosef bar Hama). (The targum to Neviim is also sometimes referred to as the targum of Rav Yosef.)

== Other Targumim on the Torah ==
There are also a variety of western targumim on the Torah, each of which was traditionally called Targum Yerushalmi ("Jerusalem Targum"), and written in Western Aramaic. An important one of these was mistakenly labeled "Targum Jonathan" in later printed versions (though all medieval authorities refer to it by its correct name). The error crept in because of an abbreviation: the printer interpreted the abbreviation TY (ת"י) to stand for Targum Yonathan (תרגום יונתן) instead of the correct Targum Yerushalmi (תרגום ירושלמי). Scholars refer to this targum as Targum Pseudo-Jonathan. To attribute this targum to Jonathan ben Uzziel flatly contradicts the Talmudic tradition (Megillah 3a), which quite clearly attributes the targum to Nevi'im alone to him, while stating that there is no official targum to the Ketuvim. In the same printed versions, a similar fragment targum is correctly labeled as Targum Yerushalmi.

The Western Targumim on the Torah, or Palestinian Targumim as they are also called, consist of three manuscript groups: Targum Neofiti I, Fragment Targums, and Cairo Geniza Fragment Targums.

Of these Targum Neofiti I is the largest. It consist of 450 folios covering all books of the Pentateuch, with only a few damaged verses. The history of the manuscript begins 1587 when the censor Andrea de Monte (d. 1587) bequeathed it to Ugo Boncompagni—which presents an oddity, since Boncompagni, better known as Pope Gregory XIII, died in 1585. The transmission route may instead be by a certain "Giovan Paolo Eustachio romano neophito." Before this de Monte had censored it by deleting most references to idolatry. In 1602 Boncompagni's estate gave it to the College of the Neophytes, a college for converts from Judaism and Islam, until 1886, when the Holy See bought it along with other manuscripts when the Collegium closed (which is the reason for the manuscripts name and its designation). It was then mistitled as a manuscript of Targum Onkelos until 1949, when Alejandro Díez Macho noticed that it differed significantly from Targum Onkelos. It was translated and published during 1968–79, and has since been considered the most important of the Palestinian Targumim, as it is by far the most complete and, apparently, the earliest as well.

The Fragment Targums (formerly known as Targum Yerushalmi II) consist of fragments divided into ten manuscripts. Of these P, V and L were first published in 1899 by M Ginsburger, A, B, C, D, F and G in 1930 by P Kahle and E in 1955 by A Díez Macho. These manuscripts are all too fragmented to confirm what their purpose was, but they seem to be either the remains of a single complete targum or short variant readings of another targum. As a group, they often share theological views with Targum Neofiti, which has led to the belief that they could be variant readings of that targum.

The Cairo Geniza Fragment Targums originate from the Ben Ezra Synagogue's genizah in Cairo. They share similarities with the Fragment Targums in that they consist of many fragmented manuscripts that have been collected in one targum-group. The manuscripts A and E are the oldest among the Palestinian Targum and have been dated to around the seventh century. Manuscripts C, E, H and Z contain only passages from Genesis, A from Exodus while MS B contain verses from both as well as from Deuteronomium.

The Samaritan community has their own Targum to their text of the Torah. Other Targumim were also discovered among the Dead Sea Scrolls.

== Peshitta ==
The Peshitta is the traditional Bible of Syriac Christians, who speak several different dialects of Aramaic. The translation of the Peshitta is thought to be before the year 300.
