= Ketuvim =

Third and final section of the Tanakh

The Ketuvim (/kətuːˈviːm, kəˈtuːvɪm/; Biblical Hebrew: כְּתוּבִים, romanized: Kǝṯuḇim, lit. 'Writings') is the third and final section of the Hebrew Bible, after the Torah ("instruction") and the Nevi'im ("prophets"). In English translations of the Hebrew Bible, this section is usually titled "Writings" or "Hagiographa".

In the Ketuvim, 1–2 Chronicles form one book, as do Ezra and Nehemiah, which form a single unit entitled Ezra–Nehemiah. In citations by chapter and verse, however, the Hebrew equivalents of "Nehemiah", "I Chronicles" and "II Chronicles" are used, as the system of chapter division was imported from Christian usage. Collectively, eleven books are included in the Ketuvim.

== Groups of books ==
=== Sifrei Emet ===
In Masoretic manuscripts (and some printed editions), Psalms, the Book of Proverbs and the Book of Job are presented in a special two-column form emphasizing the parallel stichs in the verses, which are a function of their poetry. Collectively, these three books are known as Sifrei Emet (סִפְרֵי אֶמֶת, sip̄rē ʾemeṯ, 'documents of truth')—an acronym of the titles of the three books in Hebrew: איוב, משלי, תהלים yields אמ״ת emet, 'truth').

These three books are also the only ones in the Hebrew Bible with a special system of cantillation that is designed to emphasize parallel stichs within verses. However, the beginning and end of the Book of Job are in the normal prose system.

=== Five Megillot ===
The five relatively short books of Song of Songs, the Book of Ruth, the Book of Lamentations, Ecclesiastes and the Book of Esther are collectively known as the Five Megillot (Hamesh Megillot) or Five Scrolls. These are the latest books collected and designated as "authoritative" in the Jewish canon. These scrolls are traditionally read over the course of the year in many Jewish communities. The list below presents them in the order they are read in the synagogue on holidays, beginning with the Song of Songs on Passover.

=== Other books ===
The remaining books in the Ketuvim are the Book of Daniel, Ezra–Nehemiah and the Books of Chronicles. These books share a number of distinguishing characteristics:

- The Talmudic tradition ascribes late authorship to all of them.
- Daniel and Ezra are the only books in the Hebrew Bible with significant portions in Biblical Aramaic.
- These two also describe relatively late events (i.e., the Babylonian captivity and the subsequent restoration of Zion).

== Order of the books ==
The following list presents the books of the Ketuvim in the order they appear in most printed editions. It also divides them into three subgroups based on the distinctiveness of Sifrei Emet and Hamesh Megillot.

The Sifrei Emet:

- Tehillim (Psalms) תְהִלִּים
- Mishlei (Proverbs) מִשְלֵי
- Iyyôbh (Job) אִיּוֹב

The Five Megillot

- Shīr Hashīrīm (Song of Songs) שִׁיר הַשִׁירִים (Passover)
- Rūth (Ruth) רוּת (Shavuot)
- Eikhah (Lamentations) איכה (Tisha B'Av; also called Kinnot in Hebrew)
- Qōheleth (Ecclesiastes) קהלת (Sukkot)
- Estēr (Esther) אֶסְתֵר (Purim)

Other books

- Dānî'ēl (Daniel) דָּנִיֵּאל
- 'Ezrā (Ezra–Nehemiah) עזרא
- Divrei ha-Yamim (Chronicles) דברי הימים

The Jewish textual tradition never finalized the order of the books in the Ketuvim. The Babylonian Talmud (Bava Batra 14b–15a) gives their order as Ruth, Psalms, Job, Proverbs, Ecclesiastes, Song of Songs, Lamentations, Daniel, Esther, Ezra, and Chronicles.

In Tiberian Masoretic codices, including the Aleppo Codex and the Leningrad Codex, and often in old Spanish manuscripts as well, the order is Chronicles, Psalms, Job, Proverbs, Ruth, Song of Songs, Ecclesiastes, Lamentations, Esther, Daniel, and Ezra.

== Canonization ==
The Ketuvim is the last of the three portions of the Tanakh to have been accepted as Biblical canon. There is no scholarly consensus as to when the Hebrew Bible canon was fixed: some scholars argue that it was fixed by the Hasmonean dynasty, while others argue it was not fixed until the second century CE or even later.

While the Torah may have been considered canon by Israel as early as the 5th century BCE and the Former and Latter Prophets were canonized by the 2nd century BCE, Michael Coogan says that the Ketuvim was not a fixed canon until the 2nd century CE. According to T. Henshaw, as early as 132 BCE, some references suggest that the Ketuvim were starting to take shape, though they lacked a formal title. Jacob Neusner argues that the notion of a biblical canon was not prominent in 2nd-century Rabbinic Judaism or even later.

Against Apion, the writing of Josephus in 95 CE, treated the text of the Hebrew Bible as a closed canon to which "no one has ventured either to add, or to remove, or to alter a syllable"; Michael Barber, however, avers that Josephus' canon is "not identical to that of the modern Hebrew Bible". For a long time, following this date, the divine inspiration of Esther, the Song of Songs, and Kohelet (Ecclesiastes) was often under scrutiny.

In the 20th century, many scholars seemed to believe that the limits of the Ketuvim as canonized scripture were determined by the Council of Jamnia (c. 90 CE); the Council of Jamnia hypothesis is largely discredited today.

== Liturgical use ==
The Aleppo Codex from a facsimile edition. This file contains Ketuvim from the manuscript, including Chronicles, Psalms, Job, Proverbs, Ruth, and the beginning of the Song of Songs. The manuscript is missing the end of Ketuvim, including the rest of the Song of Songs, Ecclesiastes, Lamentations and Esther.

There is no formal system of synagogal reading of Ketuvim equivalent to the Torah portion and haftarah. It is thought that there was once a cycle for reading the Psalms, parallel to the triennial cycle for Torah reading, as the number of psalms (150) is similar to the number of Torah portions in that cycle, and remnants of this tradition exist in Italy. All Jewish liturgies contain copious extracts from the Psalms, but these are normally sung to a regular recitative or rhythmic tune rather than read or chanted. Some communities also have a custom of reading Proverbs in the weeks following Pesach, and Job on the Ninth of Ab.

The five megillot are read on the festivals, as mentioned above, though Sephardim have no custom of public reading of Song of Songs on Passover or Ecclesiastes on Sukkot. There are traces of an early custom of reading a haftarah from Ketuvim on Shabbat afternoons, but this does not survive in any community. Some Reform communities that operate a triennial cycle choose haftarot on Shabbat morning from Ketuvim as well as Neviim.

=== Extraliturgical public reading ===
In some Near and Middle Eastern Jewish traditions, the whole of Ketuvim (as well as the rest of the Tanakh and the Mishnah) is read each year on a weekly rota, usually on Shabbat afternoons. These reading sessions are not considered to be synagogue services, and often took place in the synagogue courtyard.

=== Cantillation ===
Medieval sources speak of three cantillation melodies, for Torah, Nevi'im and Ketuvim respectively. Today the position is more complicated. Oriental Sephardic and Yemenite communities preserve cantillation systems for the three poetic books, namely Psalms, Proverbs and the main part of Job (usually a different melody for each of the three books). No such systems exist in the Ashkenazi or Spanish and Portuguese traditions. However, the Ashkenazic yeshiva known as Aderet Eliyahu, in the Old City of Jerusalem, uses an adaptation of the Syrian cantillation-melody for these books, and this is becoming more popular among other Ashkenazim as well.

In all communities there are special cantillation melodies for Lamentations and Esther, and in some communities for the Song of Songs. Otherwise, the melody for the book of Ruth is considered the "default" melody for books of the Ketuvim not otherwise provided for. The "prose" passages at the beginning and end of the book of Job, as read on Tisha B'Av, may be read either to the tune of Ruth or to one resembling that for the Song of Songs.

== Targum to Ketuvim ==
Western targumim exist on Sifrei Emet, on the Five Megillot and on Chronicles, i.e. on all the books of Ketuvim besides Daniel and Ezra (which contain large portions in Aramaic anyway). There are several complementary targumim to Esther.

There is, however, no "official" eastern (Babylonian) targum to Ketuvim, equivalent to Targum Onkelos on the Torah and Targum Jonathan on Nevi'im. In fact, the Babylonian Talmud explicitly notes the lack of a Targum to Ketuvim, explaining that Jonathan ben Uzziel was divinely prevented from completing his translation of the Bible. A more prosaic explanation may consist in the lack of regular formal readings of Ketuvim in the synagogue (except the five Megillot), making it unnecessary to have an official system for line-by-line translation.

== See also ==
- Books of the Bible
