= Targum Jonathan =

2nd-cent. Aramaic Nevi'im translation

The Targum Jonathan (Hebrew: תרגום יונתן בן עוזיאל) is the Aramaic translation of the Nevi'im section of the Hebrew Bible employed in Lower Mesopotamia ("Babylonia").

It is not to be confused with "Targum Pseudo-Jonathan" - an Aramaic translation of the Torah - that itself is often known as "Targum Jonathan" due to a printer's error or perhaps because it is so stylistically similar to the Targum Jerusalem, which is named "Jonathan" to differentiate the two later translations.

== Origin ==
Like Targum Onkelos, it originated in the synagogue reading of a translation from the Nevi'im, which was part of the weekly lesson.

The Talmud attributes its authorship to Jonathan ben Uzziel, a pupil of Hillel the Elder, in Megillah 3a:4. According to this source, it was composed by Jonathan ben Uzziel "from the mouths of Haggai, Zechariah, and Malachi," implying that it was based on traditions derived from the last prophets. The additional statements that, on this account, the entire land of Israel was shaken and that a voice from heaven cried: "Who has revealed my secrets to the children of men?" are legendary reflections of the novelty of Jonathan's undertaking and the disapprobation it evoked. The story adds that Jonathan wished to translate the Ketuvim, but a heavenly voice instructed him to stop. The Targum to the Book of Job, which was withdrawn from circulation by Gamaliel, nasi of the Sanhedrin, may have represented the result of his attempts to translate the Ketuvim.

Jonathan ben Uzziel is named as Hillel's most prominent pupil, and the reference to his Targum is at least of historical value, so there is nothing to controvert the assumption that it served as the foundation for the present Targum to the Prophets.

It was thoroughly revised, however, before it was redacted in Babylonia. In the Babylonian Talmud it is quoted with especial frequency by Joseph, head of the Academy of Pumbedita, who writes concerning the two biblical passages Isaiah 8:6 and Zechariah 12:11, "If there were no Targum to it we should not know the meaning of these verses". This shows that as early as the beginning of the fourth century the Targum to the Prophets was recognized as of ancient authority.

The targum is sometimes cited with the introduction "Rav Yosef has translated", suggesting a tradition of authorship by Joseph bar Hama.

== Linguistic analysis ==
The language of Targum Jonathan is Aramaic. Its overall style is very similar to that of Targum Onkelos, though it sometimes seems to be a looser paraphrase of the Biblical text.

It is the result of a single redaction.

Like Targum Onkelos, it gained general recognition in Lower Mesopotamia in the third century, and from the Talmudic academies in Babylonia it was carried throughout the Diaspora. It originated, however, in Syria Palaestina but was adapted to Jewish Babylonian Aramaic, so it contains the same linguistic peculiarities as the Targum Onḳelos, including sporadic instances of Persian loanwords. In cases where the Palestinian and Babylonian texts differ, the Onqelos follows the latter.

Although Targum Jonathan was composed in classical antiquity, probably in the 2nd century, it is now known from medieval manuscripts, which contain many textual variants. The earliest attestation appears as citations of Jeremiah 2:1–2 and Ezekiel 21:23 on an incantation bowl found in Nippur.

== Liturgical use ==
In Talmudic times, and still by Yemenite Jews, Targum Jonathan was read as a verse-by-verse translation alternately with the Hebrew verses of the haftara in the synagogue. Thus, when the Talmud states that "a person should complete his portions of scripture along with the community, reading the scripture twice and the targum once", the passage may be taken to refer to the Targuma Jonathan and Onqelos.
