= Nevi'im =

Second major division of the Hebrew Bible

The Nevi'im (/nəviˈiːm, nəˈviːɪm/; Biblical Hebrew: נְבִיאִים, romanized: Nəḇiʾim, lit. 'spokespersons, prophets') is the second major division of the Tanakh (the Hebrew Bible), lying between the first division, the Torah (lit. 'instruction') and the third division, Ketuvim (lit. 'writings'). The Nevi'im are divided into two groups. The Former Prophets (Hebrew: נביאים ראשונים Nəviʾim Rishonim) consists of the narrative books of Joshua, Judges, Samuel and Kings; while the Latter Prophets (נביאים אחרונים Nəḇiʾim Aḥaronim) include the books of Isaiah, Jeremiah, Ezekiel, and the Twelve Minor Prophets.

== Synopsis ==
The Jewish tradition counts eight books in Nevi'im out of twenty-four books in the Hebrew Bible. There are four books of the Former Prophets, including Joshua and Judges, and the collected Books of Samuel and Books of Kings are each counted as one book. Among the four books of the Latter Prophets, Isaiah, Jeremiah, and Ezekiel account for three books, followed by the "Twelve" (Jewish Babylonian Aramaic: תְּרֵי־עֲשַׂר, romanized: təreˁsar: Hosea, Joel, Amos, Obadiah, Jonah, Micah, Nahum, Habakkuk, Zephaniah, Haggai, Zechariah, and Malachi), which is counted as a single book.

The development of the Hebrew Bible canon placed the Book of Daniel as part of the "Writings," or Ketuvim, rather than Nevi'im, (Note: In the various Christian Bibles for Protestants, Roman Catholics and Eastern Orthodox, there are deviations and exceptions to this order: The prophets are placed in the final section (following the writings) of the Hebrew Bible text. The major prophets (Book of Isaiah, Book of Jeremiah and Book of Ezekiel) are followed by Book of Daniel due to its prophetic nature according to common Christian theology.) in distinction to the later approach of the various Christian Bibles for Protestants, Roman Catholics, and Eastern Orthodox, in which Daniel is found among the Prophets, due to its prophetic nature according to common Christian theology. (Note: Roman Catholic Bibles also place additions to Daniel here, and the Eastern Orthodox Church includes additions to Daniel, plus 4 Maccabees following Malachi in its Bible canon. The ordering of the twelve minor prophets, however, which is roughly chronological, is the same for all three Christian traditions.)

In the Jewish liturgy, a series of selections from the Nevi'im is publicly read or sung aloud inside the synagogue as part of Jewish religious practice. The haftara follows the Torah reading on Shabbat and on Jewish holidays and fast days. The haftara readings do not contain the whole text of the Nevi‘im; they are selections.

=== Former Prophets ===
The Former Prophets are the books Joshua, Judges, 1st & 2nd Samuel, and 1st & 2nd Kings. They contain historical narratives that begin immediately after the death of Moses with the divine appointment of Joshua as his successor, who then leads the people of Israel into the Promised Land, and end with the release from imprisonment of the last king of Judah. Treating Samuel and Kings as single books, they cover:

1. Joshua's conquest of the land of Canaan (in the Book of Joshua),
2. the struggle of the people to possess the land (in the Book of Judges),
3. the people's request to God to give them a king so that they can occupy the land in the face of their enemies (in the books of 1st and 2nd Samuel)
4. the possession of the land under the divinely-appointed kings of the House of David, ending in conquest and foreign exile (1st and 2nd Kings)

The reference to the "former prophets" or "earlier prophets" in Zechariah 1:4 probably includes "the whole body of prophets" prior to the post-exilic period when Haggai and Zechariah were active.

==== Joshua ====
The Book of Joshua contains a history of the Israelites from the death of Moses to that of Joshua. After Moses' death, Joshua, as appointed by God to succeed him, receives the command to cross the Jordan River. In execution of this order, Joshua issues the requisite instructions to the stewards of the people for the crossing of the Jordan; and he reminds the Reubenites, Gadites, and the half of Manasseh of their pledge given to Moses to help their brethren. He also performs miracles, or magic, such as stopping the sun and moon, and stopping the Jordan.

The book essentially consists of three parts:

1. The history of the conquest of the land (1–12).
2. The allotment of the land to the different tribes, with the appointment of cities of refuge, the provision for the Levites (13–22), and the dismissal of the eastern tribes to their homes.
3. The farewell addresses of Joshua, with an account of his death (23, 24).

==== Judges ====
The Book of Judges (shophetim) consists of three distinct parts:

1. The Introduction (1:1–3:10 and 3:12) summarises the book of Joshua.
2. The Main Text (3:11–16:31), discussing the five Judges, Abimelech, and providing glosses for a few minor Judges.
3. The Appendices (17:1–21:25), giving two stories set in the time of the Judges, but not discussing the Judges themselves.

==== Samuel ====
The Books of Samuel (Shămuʾel שמואל) consists of five parts:

- The period of God's rejection of Eli, Samuel's birth, and subsequent judgment (1 Samuel 1:1–7:17).
- The period of the life of Saul prior to meeting David (1 Samuel 8:1–15:35).
- The period of Saul's interaction with David (1 Samuel 16:1 – 2 Samuel 1:27).
- The period of David's reign and the rebellions he suffers (2 Samuel 2:1–20:22).
- An appendix of material concerning David in no particular order, and out of sequence with the rest of the text (2 Samuel 22:1–24:25).

A conclusion of sorts appears at 1 Kings 1–2, concerning Solomon enacting a final revenge on those who did what David perceived as wrongdoing, and having a similar narrative style. While the subject matter in the Book(s) of Samuel is also covered by the narrative in Chronicles, it is noticeable that the section (2 Sam. 11:2–12:29) containing an account of the matter of Bathsheba is omitted in the corresponding passage in 1 Chr. 20.

==== Kings ====
The Books of Kings (Melakhim מלכים) contain accounts of the kings of the ancient Kingdom of Israel and the Kingdom of Judah, and the annals of the Jewish commonwealth from the accession of Solomon until the subjugation of the kingdom by Nebuchadnezzar II and the Neo-Babylonian Empire.

=== Latter Prophets ===
The Latter Prophets are divided into two groups: the major prophets (Isaiah, Jeremiah and Ezekiel) and the Twelve Minor Prophets (Hosea, Joel, Amos, Obadiah, Jonah, Micah, Nahum, Habakkuk, Zephaniah, Haggai, Zechariah and Malachi) collected into a single book. Again, although Daniel is considered a major prophet, his book is not in the category of the Nevi'im.

==== Isaiah ====
The 66 chapters of the Book of Isaiah consist primarily of prophecies of the judgments awaiting nations that are persecuting Judah. These nations include Babylon, Neo-Assyrian Empire, Philistia, Moab, Syria, The Northern Kingdom of Israel, Ethiopia, Egypt, Arabia, and Phoenicia. The prophecies concerning them can be summarized as saying that God is the God of the whole earth and that nations which think of themselves as secure in their power might well be conquered by other nations, at God's command.

Chapter 6 describes Isaiah's call to be a prophet of God. Chapters 36–39 provide historical material about King Hezekiah and his triumph of faith in God. Chapters 24–35, while too complex to characterize in brief, are primarily concerned with prophecies of a Messiah, a person anointed or given power by God, and of the Messiah's kingdom, where justice and righteousness will reign. Jews see this section as describing an actual king, a descendant of their great king, David, who will make Judah a great kingdom and Jerusalem a genuinely holy city.

The prophecy continues with what some scholars have called "The Book of Comfort", which begins in chapter 40 and completes the writing. In the first eight chapters of this book of comfort, Isaiah prophesies the deliverance of the Jews from the hands of the Babylonians and the restoration of Israel as a unified nation in the land God promised them. Isaiah reaffirms that the Jews are indeed the chosen people of God in chapter 44 and that Yahweh is the only God for the Jews, as he will show his power over the gods of Babylon in due time in chapter 46. In chapter 45:1, the Persian ruler Cyrus the Great is named as the Messiah who will overthrow the Neo-Babylonian Empire and allow the return of Israel to their original land. The remaining chapters of the book contain prophecies of the future glory of Zion under the rule of a righteous servant (52 and 54). Chapter 53 includes a very poetic prophecy about this servant, which is generally considered by Christians to refer to the crucifixion of Jesus. However, Jews typically interpret it as a reference to God's people. Although there is still the mention of judgment of false worshippers and idolaters (65 and 66), the book ends with a message of hope of a righteous ruler who extends salvation to his righteous subjects living in the Lord's kingdom on earth.

==== Jeremiah ====
The Book of Jeremiah can be divided into twenty-three chapters, which are organized into five sub-sections or books:

1. The introduction, ch. 1.
2. Scorn for the sins of Israel, consisting of seven sections, (1.) ch. 2; (2.) ch. 3–6; (3.) ch. 7–10; (4.) ch. 11–13; (5.) ch. 14–17:18; (6.) ch. 17:19–ch. 20; (7.) ch. 21–24.
3. A general review of all nations, foreseeing their destruction, in two sections, (1.) ch. 46–49; (2.) ch. 25; with a historical appendix of three sections, (1.) ch. 26; (2.) ch. 27; (3.) ch. 28, 29.
4. Two sections picturing the hopes of better times, (1.) ch. 30, 31; (2.) ch. 32,33; a historical appendix in three sections is added, (1.) ch. 34:1–7; (2.) ch. 34:8-22; (3.) ch. 35.
5. The conclusion, in two sections, (1.) ch. 36; (2.) ch. 45.

In Egypt, after an interval, Jeremiah is supposed to have added three sections, viz., ch. 37–39; 40–43; and 44. The main Messianic prophecies are in 23:1–8; 31:31–40; and 33:14–26.

Jeremiah's prophecies are noted for the frequent repetitions of the exact words, phrases, and imagery found in them. They cover about 30 years. They are not in chronological order. Modern scholars do not believe they have reliable theories about when, where, and how the text was edited into its present form.

==== Ezekiel ====
The Book of Ezekiel contains three distinct sections:

1. Judgment on Israel – Ezekiel makes a series of denunciations against his fellow Judeans (3:22–24), warning them of the certain destruction of Jerusalem, in opposition to the words of the false prophets (4:1–3). The symbolic acts, by which the extremities to which Jerusalem would be reduced are described in Chapters 4 and 5, show his intimate acquaintance with the Levitical legislation. (See, for example, Exodus 22:30; Deuteronomy 14:21; Leviticus 5:2; 7:18,24; 17:15; 19:7; 22:8)
2. Prophecies against various neighboring nations: against the Ammonites ( Ezek. 25:1–7), the Moabites ( 25:8–11), the Edomites (25:12–14), the Philistines (25:15–17), Tyre and Sidon (26–28), and against Egypt (29-32).
3. Prophecies delivered after the destruction of Jerusalem by Nebuchadnezzar II: the triumphs of Israel and of the kingdom of God on earth (Ezek. 33–39); Messianic times, and the establishment and prosperity of the kingdom of God (40–48).

==== The Twelve ====
The Twelve are:

1. Hosea or Hōsheaʿ [הושע]
2. Joel or Yōʿel [יואל]
3. Amos [עמוס]
4. Obadiah or Oḇadyā [עובדיה]
5. Jonah or Yonā [יונה]
6. Micah or Mīḵā [מיכה]
7. Nahum or Naḥūm [נחום]
8. Habakkuk or Ḥaḇaqqūq [חבקוק]
9. Zephaniah or Tsephania [צפניה]
10. Haggai or Haggai [חגי]
11. Zechariah Zeḵaryā [זכריה]
12. Malachi or Malāḵi [מלאכי]

== Liturgical use ==
A Haftara is an excerpt from the books of Nevi'im that is read publicly in the synagogue after the reading of the Torah on each Shabbat, as well as on Jewish festivals and fast days. Each Shabbat of the year, and each holiday, has its own excerpt designated as that day's haftarah.

=== Cantillation ===
There is a special cantillation melody for the haftarah, distinct from that of the Torah portion. In some earlier authorities there are references to a tune for the "prophets" generally, distinct from that for the haftarah: this may have been a simplified melody for learning purposes. (Note: The article on "Cantillation" in the Jewish Encyclopedia shows tunes for "Prophets (other readings)" for both the Western Sephardi and the Baghdadi traditions.)

Certain cantillation marks and combinations appear in Nevi'im but not within any of the Haftarah selections, and most communities therefore do not have a musical tradition for those marks. J.L. Neeman suggested that "those who recite Nevi'im privately with the cantillation melody may read the words accented by those rare notes by using a "metaphor" based on the melody of those notes in the five books of the Torah, while adhering to the musical scale of the melody for Nevi'im." Neeman includes a reconstruction of the musical scale for the lost melodies of the rare cantillation notes. In the Ashkenazi tradition, the resemblance between the Torah and Haftarah melodies is obvious and it is easy to transpose motifs between the two as suggested by Neeman. In the Sephardi traditions the haftarah melody is considerably more florid than the Torah melody, and usually in a different musical mode, and there are only isolated points of contact between the two.

=== Extraliturgical public reading ===
In some Near and Middle Eastern traditions, the whole of Nevi'im (as well as the rest of the Hebrew Bible and the Mishnah) is read each year on a weekly rota, usually on Shabbat afternoons. These reading sessions often take place in the synagogue courtyard but are not considered to be synagogue services.

== Aramaic translation ==
A targum is an Aramaic translation of the scriptures that was compiled or written in the Palestinian (Western) or in Babylonian (Eastern, Iraqi) Talmudic academies between the Second Temple period and the early Middle Ages (late first millennium). According to the Talmud, the targum on Nevi'im was composed by Jonathan ben Uzziel. Like Targum Onkelos on the Torah, Targum Jonathan is an eastern targum with early origins in the west.

Like the targum to the Torah, Targum Jonathan to Nevi'im served a formal liturgical purpose: it was read alternately, verse by verse, or in blocks of up to three verses, in the public reading of the Haftara and in the study of Nevi'im. Yemenite Jews continue the above tradition to this day and have thus preserved a living tradition of the vocalisation of the Jewish Babylonian Aramaic for the Targum to Nevi'im.

== See also ==
- Prophets in Judaism
- Codex Cairensis
