= Josep Maria Millàs i Vallicrosa =

Spanish translator and scholar

Josep Maria Millàs i Vallicrosa (Santa Coloma de Farnés, November 29, 1897 – Barcelona, September 26, 1970) was a hebraist, arabist, historian of science, epigrapher and Spanish translator.

== Biography ==
Born in the Girona town of Santa Coloma de Farnés on November 29, 1897, he pursued studies in Philosophy and Letters at the University of Barcelona, where he met Francesc Barjau, who guided his first steps in the field of Arabic and Hebrew research. He then transferred to Madrid and received his doctorate with a thesis on the influence of Andalusian poetry on Italian poetry, which he presented on April 19, 1920, under the supervision of professor Julián Ribera. Subsequently he was appointed assistant professor of Semitic languages at the University of Barcelona and prepared to apply for the Arabic-Hebrew professorship; meanwhile, he began compiling Arabic references on the history of Catalonia at the National Library in Madrid, funded by the Diputación de Barcelona. He also visited the Protectorate of Morocco with a grant from the Junta de Ampliación de Estudios (Board of Extended Studies) and the Ethnographic Archive of Catalonia.

He passed the professorship exam on November 17, 1925, but for political reasons—specifically, due to the anti-Catalan persecution under the Dictatorship of Miguel Primo de Rivera, prompted by his having presented in Catalan, his required reading, translation, and commentary of Hebrew documents—his results were not released (he was competing against a chaplain, Jaume Bages y Tarrida). As a result, he had to sit for a new professorship exam the following year. He passed again, but this time he was forced to choose the University of Madrid as his assignment, where he taught Hebrew language and literature from 1926 to 1932 and took the opportunity to catalogue Oriental translations in the Toledo Cathedral Library.

In 1932 he resolved the status of his initial professorship application and joined as Hebrew-Arabic professor at the University of Barcelona. He began then his work educating and researching, only to be interrupted by his numerous journeys to conferences and libraries, among those which stand out are his visit to the Vatican Library to catalogue the hebrew manuscripts of catalan origin (1935), and his lectures at the Hebrew University of Mount Scopus (1937–1938). Of his alumni emerged figures of such importance, including: Juan Vernet, David Romano, Leonor Martínez and Jose Faur.

He died in Barcelona on September 26, 1970.

== Tables of Peter the Ceremonious ==
The tables of Peter the Ceremonious were discovered in the late 19th century in a Latin manuscript at the National Library of France and in a Hebrew manuscript at the Vatican Apostolic Library. Moritz Steinschneider compared the two texts and contradicted Manuel Rico Sinobas—who regarded them as an epitaph of the Alfonsine Tables—adding that both manuscripts indicated they were drawn up in Barcelona by order of King Peter. Other Hebrew manuscripts were found in Switzerland and at the Vatican, in addition to a Hebrew document from Barcelona loaned by a local Rabbi before the Spanish Civil War. Josep Maria Millàs Vallicrosa ended the debate by locating the Catalan manuscript in the library of Ripoll, and, drawing on all these sources, the original tables were successfully reconstructed.

== Works ==
He wrote 36 books and over 180 articles, and was involved in the creation of the Biblioteca Hebraico-Catalana in collaboration with the Fundación Cambó (1929), in the magazine of the Escuela de Estudios Hebraicos Sefarad (School of Sefardic Jewish Studies, 1941), at the Instituto Arias Montano of the CSIC (Spanish National Research Council, 1945), the cited "Biblioteca Hebraico-Española" (1945), the Institut d'Estudis Gironins (The Institute of Geronian Studies, 1946), the Asociación para la Historia de la Ciencia Española (Association of the History of Science of Spain, 1949), and so on.

His research work began with the study of inscriptions of tombstones and hebrew catalan manuscripts with the directors of the Archive of the City of Barcelona and the Crown of Aragon, published together with Francisco Cantera in 1954

In the field of literature, he collaborated in creating a group of Targumic translators and the translation of various books of the Bible. He became interested in hebrew sacred poetry, including translations of the contemporary poet Haim Nahman Bialik, and investigated the influences of andalusian poetry on medieval literature. Moreover, he was one of the first historians to document the translations of Arabic and Hebrew works to Latin from the Late Middle Ages and established new criterion for rewriting the History of Science in al-Andalus, especially in Catalan, for which he dedicated his Ensayo sobre historia de las ideas fisicas y matematicas en la Cataluna medieval (1931). His paper on the evolution on the studies of the History of Science in Spain is reflected in abundant correspondence with other international historians like George Sarton and B. Goldstein.

He translated and commented on the texts of Abraham ben Ezra, Abu al-Salt de Denia, Azarquiel, Abraham bar Hiyya, the medical works of the Castro family, Enrique de Villena, Hasday Cresques, Ibn Bassal, Ibn Hayyay, Ibn Wafid, Jaume Ferrer, Profeit Tibbon, Ramon Llull, Ibn Gabirol etc. He also documented the influence of andalusian mathematics and astronomy on the panorama europeans science, as well as the scientific instrument (the astrolabe, the quadrant with a cursore, the cuadrante sennero, azafea, abacus, clepsydra, celestial globes, etc.), astronomy tables and agricultural practices (cultivation of cotton, relations with pharmacology, botanical gardens, tree sicknesses, etc.).

=== Other positions and contributions ===
He was named the favorite son (hijo predilecto) of Santa Coloma de Farnés, served as a corresponding member of the Royal Academy of History, was a member of the Hispanic Society of America, a counselor to the CSIC (Spanish National Research Council), a member and president (1956–1959) of the International Academy of the History of Science in Paris, and a member of the Astronomiska seminariet och Samfundet for Astronomisk Histoire Forsking in Lund. He also served as president of the Spanish Association for the History of Science, was a member of the International Commission to standardize Semitic transcription systems and of the commission for the Corpus Medicorum Arabicorum, a magíster of the Schola Lullistica Maioricensis, and president of the Association of Friends of the University of Jerusalem. He was awarded the Grand Cross of the Order of Alfonso X the Wise, the Pontifical Medal of Saint Gregory the Great, the Medalla de la Mehdauía, among other distinctions. Together with Alejandro Díez Macho he noticed that Targum Neofiti was mistitled and differed significantly from Targum Onkelos. One final mention: a crater on the moon is named after him.

== Publications ==
- Textos màgics del Nord d´Àfrica, Barcelona: Associació Catalana d´Antropologia, 1923.
- Documents hebraics de jueus catalans, Barcelona: Institut d´Estudis Catalans, 1927.
- Llibre de geometria de R. Abraham bar Hiia, Barcelona: Editorial Alpha, 1929.
- Llibre revelador de R. Abraham bar Hiia, Barcelona: Editorial Alpha, 1929.
- Assaig d´història de les idees físiques i matemàtiques a la Catalunya medieval, Barcelona: Estudis Universitaris Catalans, 1931.
- Don Profeit Tibbon. Tractat de l´assafea d´Azarquiel, Barcelona: Editorial Alpha, 1933.
- Las traducciones orientales en los manuscritos de la Biblioteca Catedral de Toledo, Madrid: CSIC, 1941.
- La poesía sagrada hebraicoespañola, Madrid: Escuela de Estudios Hebraicos, 1942.
- Salomó ibn Gabirol, como poeta y filósofo, Madrid: Instituto Arias Montano, 1945.
- El libro de los fundamentos de las Tablas Astronómicas de R. Abraham ben Ezra, Madrid: Instituto Arias Montano, 1947.
- Estudios sobre Historia de la Ciencia Española, Madrid: CSIC, 1949.
- Estudios sobre Azarquiel, Madrid: Publicaciones de las Escuelas de Árabe de Madrid y Granada, 1950.
- El libro de la Nova geometria de Ramon Llull, Barcelona: Asociación para la Historia de la Ciencia Española, 1953.
- Poesía hebraica postbíblica, Barcelona: José Janés, 1953.
- La obra Forma de la Tierra de R. Abraham bar Hiyya, Madrid: Instituto Arias Montano, 1956.
- El Liber Predicationis contra iudeos de Ramon Llull, Barcelona: Asociación para la Historia de la Ciencia Española, 1957.
- La obra de Séfer Hesbot mahlekot ha-Kokabim de R. Abraham bar Hiyya ha-Bargeloní, Barcelona: CSIC, 1959.
- Nuevos Estudios sobre Historia de la Ciencia Española, Madrid: CSIC, 1960.
- Las Tablas astronómicas del Rey Don Pedro el Ceremonioso, Madrid: CSIC, 1962.

== Legacy ==
The Josep M. Millàs Collection (a collection bearing his name) comprises 1,894 monographs and offprints on Arabic science, scientific instruments, medieval Hebrew poetry, the history of astronomy and mathematics, and the historiography of science, along with several runs of periodicals (including 40 volumes of the journals Isis and Archives Internationales d'Histoire des Sciences, which supplement the collections at the Universitat Autònoma). It also features an almost complete set of Josep Maria Millàs's works. Beyond the symbolic value of his personal archive (1901–1987)—which includes 70 pieces of original correspondence, 49 works, and 415 assorted documents—these materials substantially expand the possibilities for research in history, philology, and the history of science at the Universitat Autònoma de Barcelona.

Part of the archival material from this collection, held at the UAB Science and Technology Library, has been digitized and is available in the UAB digital document repository.

The Library Reserve of the University of Barcelona conserves some works that formed part of the personal library of Millas, and some examples of the proprietary ownership marks that identified his books among the many throughout his life.

== See also ==
- Tablas de Pedro el Ceremonioso
- Moritz Steinschneider
- Manuel Rico Sinobas

== Bibliography ==
- Cantera, F., "José Mª Millás Vallicrosa in memoriam", en Sefarad, No. 30, 1970.
- Díaz Macho, A., "El profesor José Mª Millás Vallicrosa: Premio March", en Punta Europa, No. 43-44, 1959.
- Glick, Th., "Eloge José María Millás Vallicrosa (1897–1970) and the founding of the History of Science in Spain", en Isis, No. 68, 1977.
- Mas i Solench, Josep Mª Millàs i Vallicrosa, Sta. Coloma de Farners, Ajuntament de Sta. Coloma de Farners, 1997.
- Puig, R., "La astronomía en al-Andalus. Aproximaciones historiográficas", en Arbor, No. 558-559, 1992.
- Romano, D. y Vernet, J., "Semblanzas: José Mª Millás Vallicrosa" en Anuario de Estudios Medievales, No. 4, 1967.
- Dossier electrónico: http://www.bib.uab.es/ciencies/expo/millas.htm#internet.
