= Francesca Vendrell i Gallostra =

Spanish historian (1902–1994)

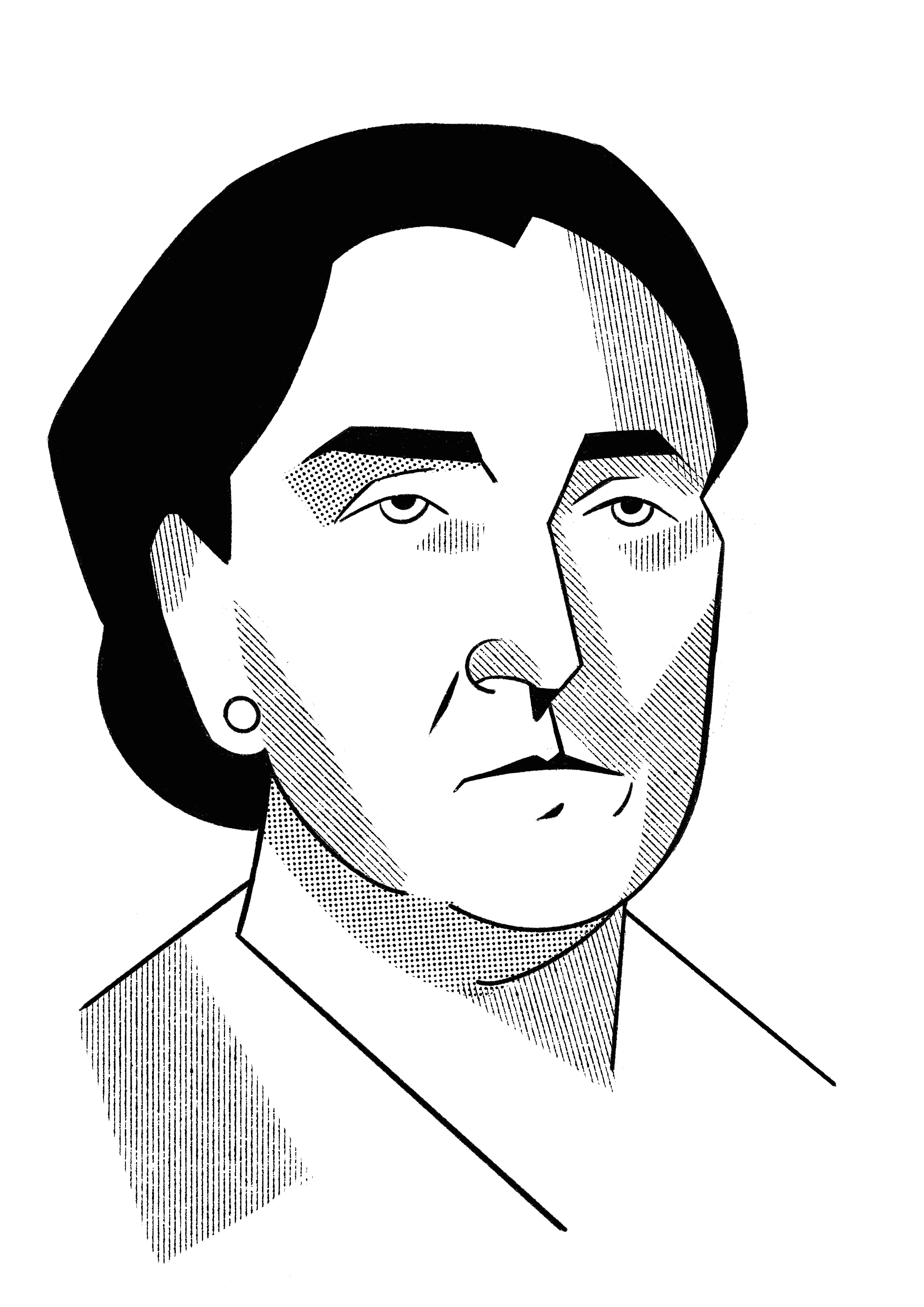
- 2024
- Born: 1902; Barcelona, Spain
- Died: 1994 (92 years old); Barcelona, Spain
- Education: Universitat de Barcelona
- Occupation: Historian
- Spouse: Josep Maria Millàs i Vallicrosa

Francesca Vendrell i Gallostra (1902, in Barcelona – 1994, in Barcelona) was a medieval historian and professor of Latin, Spanish and literature.

She studied humanities in Barcelona and got her degree in 1921. She completed her PhD in 1931 with the thesis La corte literaria de Alfonso V de Aragón y tres poetas de la misma (1933). In 1984 she became a member of the Acadèmia de Bones Lletres de Barcelona, where she read her acceptance speech Margarida de Prades en el regnat de Ferran d'Antequera.

She started her career in 1922 as a volunteer assistant in the Balmes High School (Barcelona), and she became a permanent teacher in 1928. She worked for three months in Manresa in the academic year 1934–1935. She married the Jewish historian Josep Maria Millàs i Vallicrosa in 1935 and took leave until January 1938, when she started to work in a high school in Vilafranca del Penedès. She went back to work in the Balmes High School after the Civil War, and she published several academic papers on medieval history.

== Works ==
Vendrell published her studies in several scientific journals such as Sefarad. Her research focused mainly on the reign of Ferdinand I and the role of Jews and converts in the Crown of Aragon during the 15th cent.

- En torno a la redacción del acta de Caspe, 1957
- La aljama de Teruel y la proclamación de Fernando de Antequera, 1962–63
- El cancionero de palacio edició crítica, 1946
- Jaume el Dissortat, darrer comte d'Urgell, 1956, in collaboration with Àngels Masià de Ros
- Los cancioneros del siglo XV, in Historia general de las literaturas hispánicas dirigida, edited by G. Díaz-Plaja
- Rentas reales de Aragón de la época de Fernando I (1412–1416), 1977
- Violante de Bar y el Compromiso de Caspe, Barcelona, Reial Acadèmia de Bones Lletres de Barcelona, 1992
