= Targum Neofiti =

1st-4th cent. Aramaic Torah elaboration

Targum Neofiti (or Targum Neophyti) is the largest of the western or Israeli Targumim on the Torah. The name derives from the ecclesiastical Latin word Neophyte (a new convert to a religion, in Greek neophutos) because the owners of the earliest copy were converts from Judaism. The extant copy consists of 450 folios covering all books of the Torah, with only a few damaged verses.

More than a mere Aramaic translation of the Hebrew text, Neofiti offers lengthy expansions on the biblical text at several places. It is often more expansive than Targum Onkelos, but less so than Targum Pseudo-Jonathan.

== History ==
In 1587, Andrea de Monte gave the Targum Neofiti to his friend Ugo Boncompagni, who, like him, was a convert from Judaism. De Monte had censored it by deleting most references to idolatry while he owned the manuscript. In 1602 Boncampagni gave what was at that time labeled "Item 1" along with a fragmentary targum to the College of the Neophytes, the document's namesake, who preserved it until 1886, when the Vatican bought it along with other manuscripts when the Collegium closed.

At that time Targum Neofiti was titled incorrectly as a manuscript of Targum Onkelos, and it remained unremarked until 1949, when Professor Jose Maria Millas Vallicrosa and Alejandro Díez Macho noticed that it differed significantly from Targum Onkelos. It was translated and published from 1968 to 1979 and has since then been considered the most important of the Palestinian Targumim, as it is by far the most complete of the Western Targumim and perhaps the earliest as well.

== Dating ==
Neofiti's date of origin is uncertain. The manuscript's colophon dates the copy to 1504 in Rome.

Díez Macho argues that Neofiti dated to the first century CE as part of a pre-Christian textual tradition, based upon anti-halakhic material, early geographical and historical terms, New Testament parallels, Greek and Latin words, and some supposedly pre-masoretic Hebrew text. Martin McNamara argues that Neofiti originated in the fourth century CE.

The language of the Targum Neofiti is conventionally known as "Palestinian Aramaic" as opposed to the "Babylonian Aramaic" of the Targum Onkelos.

== Text ==
The Codex itself has many marginal glosses containing corrections and different interpretations, perhaps drawn from Targum Pseudo-Jonathan.

== Bibliography ==
- Golomb, David M., The Grammar of the Targum Neofiti (Harvard, Harvard Semitic Museum, 1985) (Harvard Semitic Monographs - HSM, 34).
- McNamara, Martin, Targum Neofiti 1: Genesis (The Aramaic Bible, Volume 1A) (Collegeville, MN: Michael Glazier, 1992).
- Díez Macho, Alejandro, Neophyti 1: Targum Palestinense MS de la Biblioteca Vaticana, Vol. 1: Genesis: Edición Príncipe, Inroducción General y Versión Castellana (Madrid: Consejo Superior de Investigaciones Científicas, 1968).
- Jacob Neusner, Alan J. Avery-Peck, Judaism in Late Antiquity: Where We Stand, Issues and Debates in Ancient Judaism, Volumes 40-41 of Handbuch der Orientalistik, BRILL, 1999, ISBN 978-90-04-11282-7, 118f.
