= Sefer Asufot =

14th century manuscript compilation of medieval German Jewish practices

- Original title: ספר האסופות
- Language: Hebrew
- Publication date: 13th-14th century
- Publication place: Rhineland, Germany

Sefer ha-Asuppot (Note: Also: Asufot, Assufot, Asupot.) (Hebrew: ספר האסופות, romanized: Book of the Collections) (Note: The manuscript itself does not give a title; a later hand has written האסופות כ"י The collections, a manuscript at its head. Modern writers generally refer to the book as ספר האסופות, "Book of the collections". The first generation of 19th-century authors to discuss this MS (Luzzatto, Zunz) initially called it ספר דינים, "Book of laws".) is the modern name of a compilation of medieval German Jewish halakha and minhagim, the manuscript of which is privately held by David H. Feinberg of New York (Note: Previously MS Halberstam 115 and MS Montefiore 134. The first known owner is Isaac Raphael Finzi, (1728-1813), rabbi of Padua and vice-president of the 1806 Grand Sanhedrin. On Finzi's death it passed to Mordecai Ghirondi, who lent it to Samuel David Luzzatto. Montefiore College sold the manuscript at auction in 2004.) (fragments from the text are also found in MSS Paris 1408 and Girona 11.17). The work includes a large number of teachings, minhagim, descriptions of popular costumes, halachic rulings, and collected stories from numerous authors, displaying the ordinary life of Rhineland Jews in during the twelfth and thirteenth centuries. The manuscript is endowed with vowel signs almost throughout, which makes it the only non-liturgical and non-Biblical text of its kind, and the vowels follow the Spanish pronunciation. The manuscript is the work of several scribes, containing multiple hands and multiple inks. One scribe was probably named Meir.

Authorship is now generally attributed to Elijah ben Isaac Lattes of Carcassonne, but many scholars dissent. (Note: First proposed by Samuel David Luzzatto in 1846, when the manuscript was owned by Mordecai Ghirondi. The manuscript itself does not give a title, but a later hand has written ha-Asuppot at its head. Isaac ben Jacob de Lattes lists in his Shaarei Tzion (completed 1372) "Rabbi Elijah ben Rabbi Isaac of Carcassonne and his son Rabbi Jacob ben Rabbi Elijah of House Lattes . . . and after these, the great rabbi and our patriarch, Rabbi Judah ben Rabbi Jacob of House Lattes, who wrote books and decisions. He wrote a book, small in size but rich in quality, in the manner of responsa, and they called him "Baal Asuppot" (Jarosław, 1885, from MS Oxford Mich. 602; in MS Guenzburg 1336, "Baalei Asuppot"). This description does not match the Feinberg manuscript, which is neither short nor composed of responsa. Joshua Boaz ben Simon Baruch (Shiltei Giborim AZ 10a) quotes a "Baal Asuppot", apparently in responsa form, which citation is not found in the Feinberg MS. Gedaliah ibn Yahya ben Joseph, in his Shalshelet haQabbalah (Venice, 1587) records a slightly different version: "I found in the Shaarei Tzion . . . Rabbi Elijah ben Rabbi Isaac of Carcassonne, who wrote the Sefer Asuppot". Some scholars argued that the reference is genuine, and refers to a separate book, perhaps this book; others that it is an accidental conflation. Ibn Yahya was famously sloppy and, in MS Guenzburg 652, an earlier version of the Shalshelet haQabbalah (f. 98b), he had instead listed, "Rabbi Elijah ben Rabbi Isaac of Carcassonne, and his descendants, who wrote the Sefer ha-Asuppot".) The main author was Ashkenazi and a student of Eleazar of Worms (d. 1238), (Note: Heinrich Gross doubted the quality of this evidence, but it is accepted by Glassberg, Dziubas, and Stern.) but some content is from a later period, including a model writ of divorce dated 1307. Avigdor Aptowitzer attributed at least part of the text to a grandson of Eliezer ben Joel HaLevi, suggesting Eliezer's great-grandson Abraham ben Eliezer Halevi, a student of Meir of Rothenburg (d. 1293), but Dziubas disagrees.

S D Luzzatto published some excerpts from the book in 1846. Eliakim Carmoly publicly appealed for the manuscript's publication in 1867. Moritz Güdemann published a marginal annotation, containing an incantation against demons transliterated from German, in 1875. Jacob Glassberg published some excerpts on circumcision in 1892. Moses Gaster published some excerpts on Passover in his Montefiore Report 1893. Aptowitzer included sections which he attributed to Eliezer b. Joel HaLevi's grandson in Mavo l'Sefer RAbYH (1938). Abraham Isaac Dziubas published a two-volume edition of the Asuppot's section on forbidden foods in 1942. Simha Assaf republished the excerpt on education in 1948. Excerpts were published and republished by Samuel Eliezer Stern in Moriah 173 (1987), Mayim Hayyim (1989), and Tzfunot 1 (1989), and eventually in his Meorot haRishonim (2002). Alexander Jungerman included excerpts on idolatry in Qovetz Shitot Qamai: A"Z (2006).

== Contents ==
The content of the work mostly deals with the laws relating to divorce, Rosh Hashanah, tefillin, the shechita (the ritual slaughtering of animals according to kashrut), the observance of Shabbat, and Passover, with a description of the ritual of the Seder. The work also discuses medical prescriptions, charms, marriage ceremonies, numerous commercial and religious contracts, various forms of excommunication, and mourning and burial customs. Lastly, at the end of the work is a summary of all material discussed. The vocalization of the work has been studied by scholars, who have concluded that medieval German Ashkenazi vocalization was much akin to contemporary Sephardic vocalization.

== Character ==
The author of Asuppot compiles several rich literary resources, which displays more interest in every branch of religious life than the majority of similar compilers. Particularly, the author often mentions local customs and even superstitions. Additionally, the accuracy with which he indicates the sources of his information is far beyond his contemporaries. From a philological point of view, the book possesses considerable interest, from the fact that numerous German glosses are found in the text that explain difficult or obscure terms, and some that show, incidentally, the intimate knowledge of German possessed by the Jews of that time.
