= Valencian Bible =

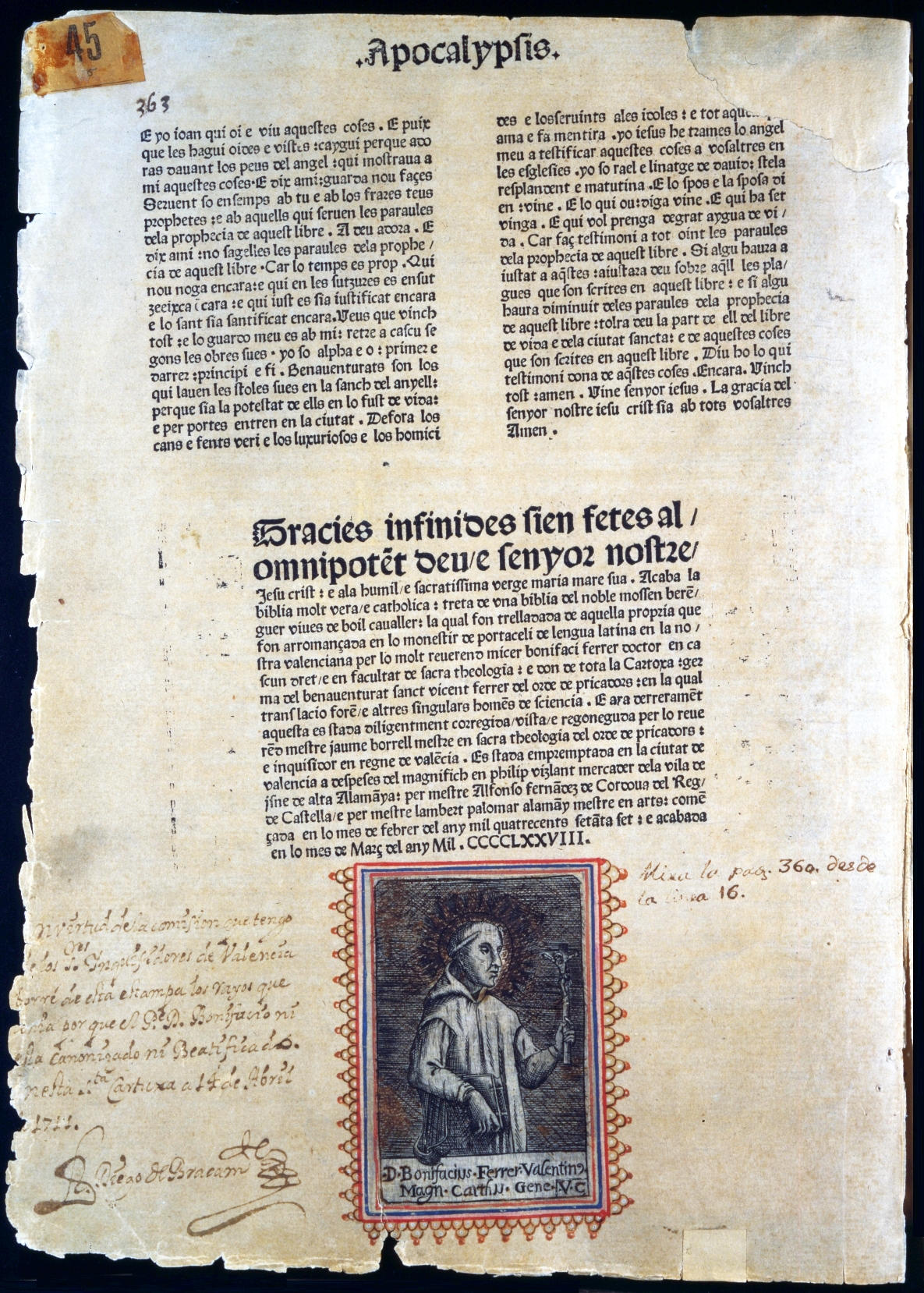
One of the two surviving pages of the 1477/78 Bible

The Valencian Bible was the first printed Bible in the Catalan language: "in our Valencian language" according to the translator. It was first printed between 1477 and 1478. It is the third Bible printed in a modern language (the preceding ones were printed in German in 1466 and Italian in 1471). The first printed Bible was the Latin Bible, Vulgate version, printed at Mainz in 1455.

The first complete Catalan Bible translation was produced by the Catholic Church, between 1287 and 1290. It was entrusted to Jaume de Montjuich by Alfonso II of Aragon. Remains of this version can be found in Paris (Bibliothèque Nationale). (Ref?)

During the Inquisition, all copies were burned, and Daniel Vives, who was considered to be the main author, was imprisoned. However, the translation is now ascribed to Bonifaci Ferrer.

The last surviving paper sheet of this Bible is at the Hispanic Society in New York City.

== See also ==
- Bible translations into Catalan
