= Isaac Lattes =

Isaac ben Jacob de Lattes (Hebrew: יצחק בן יעקב דלאטש) was a rabbi who lived in Provence. In 1372 he completed his Kiryat Sefer, including two parts, Shaarei Tzion and Toledot Yiẓḥaḳ. The first is a chronicle in which he gives valuable information concerning other Provençal authors and discusses the history of tradition, while the second is an allegorical commentary on the Torah.

Shaarei Tzion plagiarizes from Menachem HaMeiri's introduction to Avot, as well as from other medieval authors. Gedaliah ibn Yahya quotes from Shaarei Tzion frequently in his Shalshelet haQabbalah, as does Chaim Yosef David Azulai in Shem haGdolim.

Salomon Buber published the first part, Shaarei Tzion, in Jarosław, 1885. The book survives partially in two manuscripts: MS Oxford Mich. 602 (Neubauer 1298), which formed the basis for Buber's edition, and MS Guenzberg 1336. A critical edition of the Shaarei Tzion was published by Shlomo Zalman Havlin at the back of his edition of Menachem HaMeiri's Seder haQabbalah (Mossad haRav Kook, 2006).
