= Josep Melcior Prat i Colom =

Josep Melcior Prat i Colom, or in Spanish Joseph Melchior de Prat, (1780 in Els Prats de Rei, Anoia – 1855 in San Sebastian) was a Catalan politician, writer, and in 1835 governor of Barcelona, and 1855 civil governor of Guipuzcoa.

He was exiled in Britain, at Knaresborough, Yorkshire, from 1823 to 1833 during which time he translated the New Testament from the Latin Vulgate into Catalan, with the assistance of another Catalan exile, a Ramon Busanya, at the request of the British and Foreign Bible Society, and as a nationalist impulse to the Catalan language. Lo Nou Testament de nostre Senyor Jesu-Christ was published afterwards in Barcelona (1836) and Madrid (1888).
