= Bonifaci Ferrer =

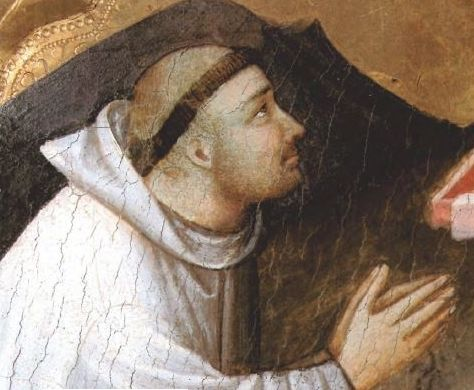
Boniface Ferrer depicted in a 14th-century reredos painting.

Boniface Ferrer (1350–1417) was a Carthusian monk, brother of Saint Vincent Ferrer, and translator of the first Bible into Valencian Catalan (Valencian Bible 1488).

His translation was the first translation into a Romance language (Catalan) since Peter Waldo's translation into Provençal.

In 1412, Boniface was prior of the monastery of Portaceli. He and his brother Vincent were named as two of the three delegates from the Kingdom of Valencia sent to Caspe to decide the question of a successor to Martin of Aragon, who had died without legitimate issue. There they met with the delegates from the Kingdom of Aragon and the Principality of Catalonia. Both brothers voted for Ferdinand of Castile, who was proclaimed King of Aragon on June 28.
