= Jonathan ben Uzziel =

1st-century Judean Talmudic rabbi

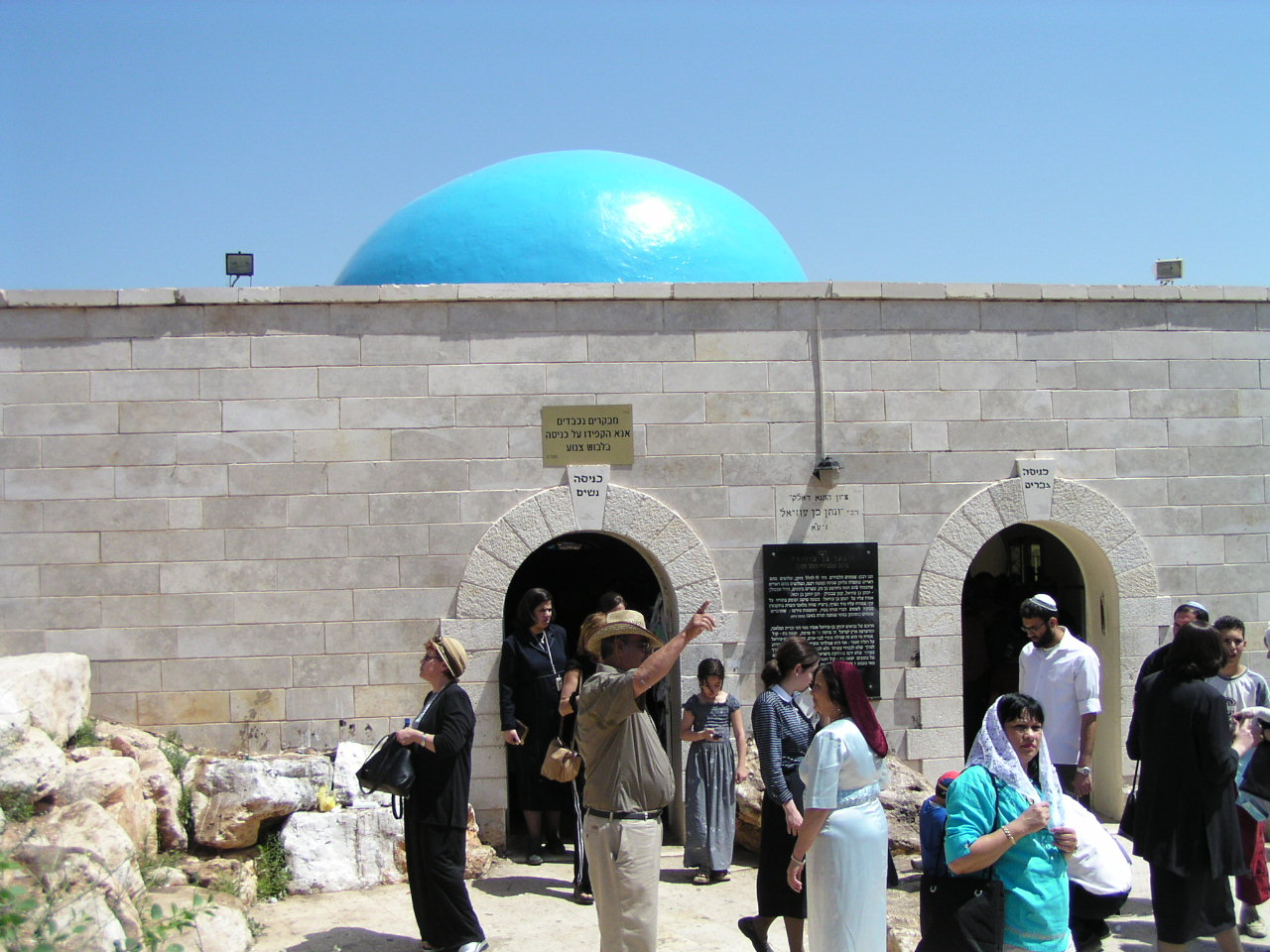
Tomb of Jonathan Ben Uzziel

Jonathan ben Uzziel (Hebrew: יונתן בן עוזיאל) was one of the 80 tannaim who studied under Hillel the Elder during the time of Roman-ruled Judea.

Jonathan ben Uzziel is mentioned several times in the Talmud. Jonathan rendered an Aramaic translation (targum) of the Major and Minor Prophets which still survives today. When he wished to procure a translation of the Ketuvim, a Divine voice (Hebrew: bat ḳol) was heard telling him that what he had done was sufficient for humanity. "Yonatan ben Uziel is most famous for Targum Yonatan—his Aramaic translation and elucidation on the Prophets. When he composed it, tradition tells us, the Land of Israel trembled, and a heavenly voice called out, “Who has revealed My secrets to mortals?” Yonatan humbly responded that he had done so not for his own honor, but to help the Jewish people understand the words of the Prophets. He wanted to do the same for the Writings (Ketuvim), but was stopped by Heaven, as those secrets are reserved for the Messianic era."

Hillel the Elder had eighty disciples: thirty of them were worthy that the Divine Presence should rest upon them as upon Moses our teacher, but their generation was not worthy of it; thirty of them were worthy that the intercalation of the years should be determined by them; and twenty were average. The greatest of them all was Jonathan b. ’Uzziel[.]

== Early life ==
Little is known about Jonathan ben Uzziel's early upbringing, except that he was one of Hillel the Elder's most outstanding pupils.

=== Family and heritance ===
According to the Jerusalem Talmud, Jonathan was born into a wealthy family. At one point in Jonathan's life, his father made a vow that his son, Jonathan, would not be entitled to any of his fortune (disinherit). Instead, his father wrote in his will and testament that Shammai would be the recipient of his estate and money, conveyed to him as a gift. When this money came into the hands of Shammai, who was not willing to see Jonathan taken advantage of and deprived of his father's earnings, Shammai resolved to sell part of the inheritance, and to dedicate unto the Temple another part of the inheritance, while the remainder he gave as a gift to Jonathan ben Uzziel.

== Tomb ==
According to tradition, the tomb of ben Uzziel is located in Amuka, Galilee near Safed, Israel.

According to Zev Vilnai, Rabbi Shmuel ben Shimshon wrote about the tomb in 1210: "There is a large tree next to it, and the Ishmaelites [Arabs] bring oil and light a candle in his honor and make vows in his honor." An illustration of Yonatan ben Uzziel's tomb appears in "Ancestry of fathers and prophets" (Hebrew: יחוס אבות ונביאים), a book printed in 1537.

It is customary to visit ben Uzziel's tomb on Rosh Chodesh, the first day of the lunar month, and on 26 Sivan (the day on which he died), although visitors arrive all year round. A practice that began in the 17th century was to pray at the gravesite for a good marriage partner, for children, satisfaction from one's children, a good livelihood, health and happiness. Many unmarried men and women pray there for a match. Doing so is considered a segula (propitious remedy) for finding one's mate within the coming year.

Zev Vilnai offers two theories for this custom (these do not seem to be original theories, as they had been referenced in the Haredi community before he published them): (a) The practice developed from the Pseudo-Jonathan translation of the Bible on Deuteronomy 24:6, where he writes that anyone who prevents the connection between a husband and wife forfeits his portion in the world-to-come; (b) The practice is based on a mistaken reading of Rashi who writes in reference to a place called Harpania (Aramaic: הרפניא) "Everyone goes there: all ineligible men (pesulim) who cannot find a woman turn and go there. And it is deeper (Amuka) and worse than Gehinnom." The words "and it is deeper (Amuka)" are the headwords to Rashi's next comment, and do not relate to his preceding comment about men going to Harpania to look for women. However, the mistaken reading connects Rashi's words to the community named Amuka.

It is also widely believed that Jonathan ben Uzziel was single or childless, so men in similar situations seek to benefit from his special powers, but nowhere in the writings of Chazal is this stated.
