= Joseph bar Hama =

Rav Joseph bar Hama (or Yosef bar Hama; Hebrew: רב יוסף בר חמא) was a Babylonian rabbi of the third generation of amoraim.

He was a disciple of R. Sheshet. However, The Talmud also cites statements that he delivered on the authority of Rav Nachman bar Yaakov.

He had a son of the name of Rava (Rava b. Joseph b. Hama), who became one of the most prominent Amora sages and the head of the academy of Pumbedita, in Mahuza of Babylonia.
