= Alejandro Díez Macho =

Spanish Catholic priest and Hebraist

Alexandro Díez Macho (13 May 1916 in Villafría de la Peña, Palencia – 1984 in Barcelona) was a Spanish Catholic priest and Hebraist. In 1951–52 he invited professor Alexander Sperber of New York to the University of Barcelona to work with Spanish scholars on the manuscripts of the Targum Neofiti.
