= Targum Onkelos =

Aramaic Torah translation (c. 110 CE)

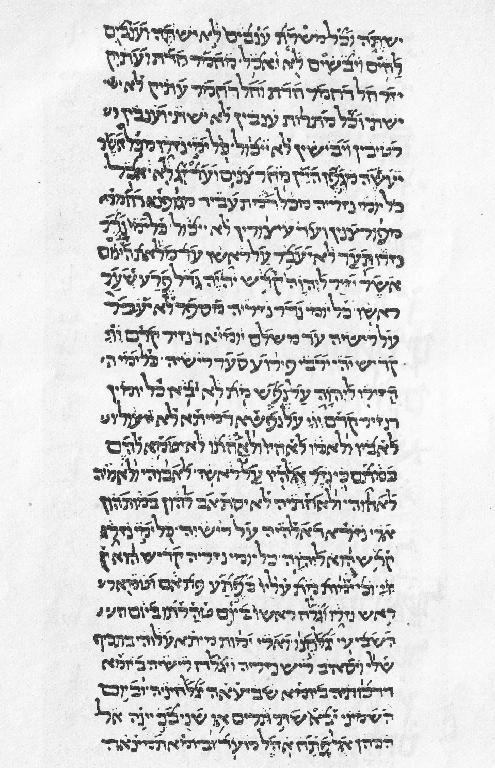
Interlinear text of Hebrew Numbers 6.3–10 with Aramaic Targum Onkelos from the British Library.

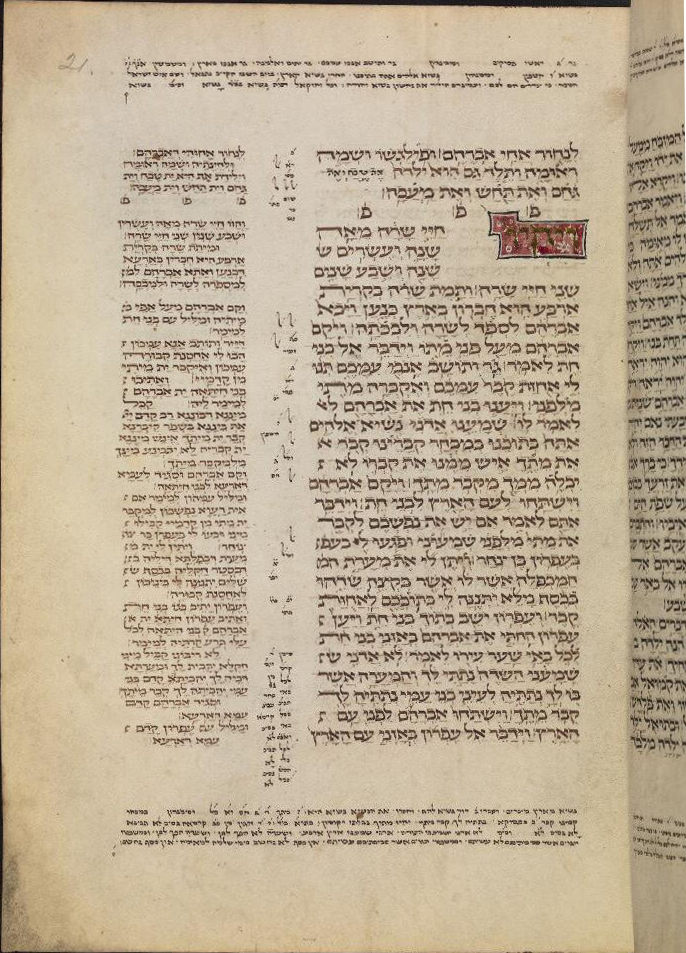
Hebrew text (right) and Aramaic Onkelos (left) in a Hebrew Bible dating from 1299 held by the Bodleian Library

Targum Onkelos (or Onqelos; Jewish Babylonian Aramaic: תַּרְגּוּם אֻנְקְלוֹס, Targūm ’Unqəlōs) is the primary Jewish Aramaic targum ("translation") of the Torah, accepted as an authoritative translated text of the Five Books of Moses and thought to have been written in the early second century CE.

== Authorship ==
Authorship of the Targum Onkelos is traditionally attributed to Onkelos, a famous convert to Judaism in Tannaic times (c. 200 CE). According to the Talmud, the essential content of Targum Onkelos was already known in the time of Ezra (immediately after the Babylonian captivity). However, it was later forgotten by the masses, and rerecorded by Onkelos.

While the Aramaic translation of the Torah is traditionally attributed to Onkelos, a translation of the Torah into Greek is mentioned in the Jerusalem Talmud as being made by Aquila of Sinope. However, most scholars hold these to be one and the same person. According to Epiphanius of Salamis, the Greek translation was made by Aquilas before he converted to Judaism, while the Aramaic translation was made after his conversion. This is said to have been under the direct guidance and instruction of the tannaim Joshua ben Hananiah and Eliezer ben Hurcanus. Indeed, the same biographical stories that the Jerusalem Talmud attributes to Aquila, the Babylonian Talmud attributes to Onkelos.

Rabbi Yirmeya said, and some say Rabbi Ḥiyya bar Abba: The translation of the Torah was composed by Onkelos the convert based on Rabbi Eliezer and Rabbi Yehoshua.

— Tractate Megilla 3a, Babylonian Talmud

Rebbi Jeremiah in the name of Rebbi Ḥiyya bar Abba: Akylas [עקילס, Aquilas] the proselyte translated the Torah before Rebbi Eliezer and Rebbi Joshua; they praised him [and said to him], you are a superhuman beauty

— Tractate Megillah 1:9 [10b], Jerusalem Talmud

The overwhelming similarities between the biographies of Aquila and Onkelos has led many to conclude they are the same person. Zvi Hirsch Chajes identified the Aramaic "Targum Onkelos" as Aquila's Greek translation, translated once again into Aramaic. Likewise, A.E. Silverstone (1931:73) has shown quite consummately that Aquilas wrote both the Greek and the Aramaic versions, insofar that "both versions betray the same outstanding characteristics."

A modern scholar has argued that the Aramaic translation must date to the late fourth-early fifth centuries, due to reusing language from other midrashim composed at that time, and thus could not have been composed by Aquila/Onkelos, who lived in the second century. Others, dissenting, have concluded that Onkelos' Aramaic translation originated in Syria Palaestina in the first or early second centuries CE, but that its final redaction was done in Babylonia probably in the fourth or fifth century CE. Onkelos' revised translation became the official version used in translating the Torah on each Shabbat, displacing the texts of the earlier Palestinian Aramaic tradition which had been widely used. The Babylonian Talmud refers to the Torah's Aramaic translation (Targum Onkelos) as "targum didan" ("our translation"), as opposed to that of the more ancient Palestinian Targum tradition. The earliest text samples (Exodus 15:9–12 in Hebrew-Aramaic) appear on two incantation bowls (5th–7th centuries CE) discovered at Nippur, Babylonia.

== Ritual use ==
In Talmudic times, readings from the Torah within the synagogues were rendered, verse-by-verse, into an Aramaic translation. To this day, this old custom survives with the Yemenite Jews, who still read the Torah and the Haftara with the Aramaic translation (in this case, Targum Onkelos for the Torah and Targum Jonathan ben 'Uzziel for the Haftarah). The custom to read the Aramaic Targum each Shabbat in the synagogue during the reading of the weekly Torah portion was eventually abandoned by other communities, and eventually codified in the Shulhan Arukh (Orach Chayim §145:3) who did not encourage its practice, saying that they do not understand the meaning of its words.

Where the custom is to read the Aramaic Targum during the public reading of the Torah on Sabbath days, the story of Reuben (Gen 35:22) and the second "Golden Calf" episode (Ex 32:21–25) are read but not translated, as they involve shameful events. Similarly, the Priestly Blessing (Num 6:24–26) is read but not translated, since the blessings are only to be recited in Hebrew.

The reading of the Targum, verse by verse, in conjunction with the Torah that is read aloud on Shabbat is not to be confused with a different practice, namely, that of reviewing the entire Torah portion before the commencement of the Shabbat, and which practice has its source in the Babylonian Talmud, and which the codifiers of Jewish law have ruled as Halacha. Berakhot 8a-b states, "Rav Huna bar Yehuda said that Rabbi Ami said: A person should always complete his Torah portions with the congregation. The congregation reads a particular Torah portion every Shabbat, and during the week prior to each Shabbat, one is required to read the Bible text of the weekly portion twice and the translation once." Here, the reference is to completing the reading of the Torah portion at home or in the beth midrash, along with others, reading in tandem, during which reading each verse is repeated twice; once by the reader himself, followed by a repetition of the same verse by the entire group, and lastly by the initial reader himself, who cites the Aramaic Targum of Onkelos.

The days in which the Torah portion was read depended largely upon custom. Some had it as their custom to break down the reading into two days. Among Yemenite Jews, Wednesday mornings were given over to the first half of the Torah portion, while Thursday mornings were given to the second half. Others read the entire Torah portion on Thursday mornings, while others on Thursday nights.

== Methodology ==
The inter-relationship between various significant ancient manuscripts of the Old Testament. LXX denotes the original Septuagint.

Onkelos' Aramaic translation of the Five Books of Moses is almost entirely a word-by-word, literal translation of the Hebrew Masoretic Text, with very little supplemental material in the form of aggadic paraphrase. However, where there are found difficult biblical passages, Onkelos seeks to minimize ambiguities and obscurities. He sometimes employs non-literal aggadic interpretations or expansions in his translated text, usually in those places where the original Hebrew is marked either by a Hebrew idiom, a homonym, or a metaphor, and could not be readily understood otherwise.

The translator is unique in that he avoids any type of personification, or corporeality, with God, often replacing "human-like" characteristics representing God in the original Hebrew with words that convey a more remote and impersonal sense. For example, "my face" (Heb. panai) is replaced by "from before me" (Exodus 33:23), while "beneath his feet" is replaced by "under his throne of glory" (Exodus 24:10), and "The Lord came down upon Mount Sinai" by "The Lord manifested himself upon Mount Sinai" (Exodus 19:20). Samuel David Luzzatto suggests that the translation was originally meant for the "simple people". This view was strongly rebutted by Nathan Marcus Adler in his introduction to his commentary to Targum Onkelos Netinah La-Ger. He often updates the names of biblical nations, coinage and historical sites to the names known in his own post-biblical era.

In matters of halakha, the targum entirely agrees with Rabbi Akiva's opinions. Some authors suggest that Akiva provided for a revised text of the essential base of Targum Onkelos.

Some of the more notable changes made by Onkelos, in which he attempts to convey the underlying meaning of a verse, rather than its literal translation, are as follows:

- (Genesis 1:2) (Aramaic: וְאַרְעָא הֲוָת צָדְיָא וְרֵיקָנְיָא, in Hebrew characters) [= "...and the earth was devastated and empty"], instead of "...and the earth was without form and void."
- (Genesis 2:7) (Aramaic: הות באדם לְרוּחַ מְמַלְלָא, in Hebrew characters) [= "...and it became in man a speaking spirit"], instead of "...and man became a living soul."
- (Genesis 3:5) (Aramaic: וּתְהוֹן כְּרַבְרְבִין, in Hebrew characters), [= "...and you shall be like potentates"], instead of "...and you shall be like gods."
- (Genesis 3:15) (Aramaic: הוּא יְהִי דְּכִיר מָה דַּעֲבַדְתְּ לֵיהּ מִלְּקדְמִין וְאַתּ תְּהֵי נָטַר לֵיהּ לְסוֹפָא, in Hebrew characters) [="...he (i.e. Eve's offspring) shall remember what you (i.e. the serpent) did to him at the beginning, but you (i.e. the serpent) shall hold it against him at the end"], instead of "he shall bruise your head, and you shall bruise his heel."
- (Genesis 4:16) (Aramaic: וּנְפַק קַיִן מִן קֳדָם יי' וִיתֵיב בַּאֲרַע גָּלֵי וּמְטֻלְטַל דַּהֲוָת חֲשִׁיבָא עֲלוֹהִי מִלְּקַדְמִין כְּגִנְּתָא דְּעֵדֶן, in Hebrew characters) [="And Cain went out from the presence of the Lord, and dwelt in a land of exiles and wandering, which was considered by him beforehand as the Garden of Eden"], instead of "Cain went out from the presence of the Lord, and dwelt in the land of Nod to the east of Eden."
- (Genesis 18:8) (Aramaic: וְהוּא מְשַׁמֵּשׁ עִלָּוֵיהוֹן תְּחוֹת אִילָנָא, in Hebrew characters), [= "...and he waited upon them under the tree, etc."], instead of "...and he stood by them under the tree, etc."
- (Genesis 20:13) (Aramaic: וַהֲוָה כַּד טְעוֹ עַמְמַיָּא בָּתַר עוּבָדֵי יְדֵיהוֹן, יָתִי קָרֵיב יְיָ לְדַחְלְתֵיהּ מִבֵּית אַבָּא, in Hebrew characters), [= "And it was, when the people erred after the works of their hands, the Lord did bring me near to the fear of Himself, from [among] the house of my father..."], instead of "And when God caused me to wander from my father's house, etc."
- (Genesis 20:16) (Aramaic: הָא יְהַבִית אֶלֶף סִלְעִין דִּכְסַף לַאֲחוּיִיךְ הָא הוּא לִיךְ כְּסוּת דִּיקָר חֲלָף דִּשְׁלַחִית דְּבַרְתִּיךְ וַחֲזֵית יָתִיךְ וְיָת כָּל דְּעִמִּיךְ וְעַל כָּל מָא דַּאֲמַרְתְּ אִתּוֹכָחְתְּ, in Hebrew characters) [= "...behold, I have given to your brother one-thousand silver coins in specie. Lo! It is for you an honorable remittance, for my having sent [unto you] and having controlled you; and for my having seen you [in private] and everything that is with you, and how that you have been proven [to be honest] in all the things you have spoken"], instead of "I have given your brother a thousand pieces of silver: behold, he is to you a covering of the eyes, unto all that are with you, and with all other: thus she was reproved."
- (Genesis 22:14) (Aramaic:וּפְלַח וְצַלִּי אַבְרָהָם תַּמָּן בְּאַתְרָא הַהוּא. אֲמַר קֳדָם יי' הָכָא יְהוֹן פָּלְחִין דָּרַיָּא. בְּכֵין יִתְאֲמַר בְּיוֹמָא הָדֵין בְּטוּרָא הָדֵין אַבְרָהָם קֳדָם יי' פְּלַח, in Hebrew characters) "And Abraham worshiped and prayed there in that place, and said before God, 'Here shall coming generations worship the Lord.' Wherefore, it shall be said on that day, 'In this mountain Abraham worshiped before God'."], instead of "And Abraham called the name of that place Jehovah-jireh: as it is said to this day, In the mount of the Lord it shall be seen."
- (Genesis 25:27) (Aramaic:וְיַעֲקֹב גְּבַר שְׁלִים מְשַַׁמֵּישׁ בֵּית אוּלְפָנָא, in Hebrew characters) [="...and Jacob was a wholly perfect man, attending the house of study"], instead of "...and Jacob was a plain man, dwelling in tents."
- (Genesis 27:13) (Aramaic:עֲלַי אִתְאֲמַר בִּנְבוּאָה דְּלָא יֵיתוֹן לְוָטַיָּא עֲלָך בְּרִי, in Hebrew characters) [="...Concerning me it was said in prophecy no curses will come upon you, my son, etc."], instead of "...'Let your curse be on me, my son, etc."
- (Genesis 31:53) (Aramaic:וְקַיֵּים יעֲקֹב בִּדְדָּחֵיל לֵיהּ אֲבוּהִי יִצחָק, in Hebrew characters) [="...and Jacob made an oath by him whom his father Isaac feared" (i.e. the God of his father, without naming Him)], instead of "...and Jacob sware by the fear of his father Isaac."
- (Genesis 38:26) (Aramaic: וַאֲמַר זַכָּאָה, מִנִּי מְעַדְּיָא, in Hebrew characters), [= "...and he said, 'She is in the right. It is from me that she is pregnant', etc."], instead of "...and he said, 'She has been more righteous than I', etc."
- (Genesis 41:45) (Aramaic: וּקְרָא פַּרְעֹה שׁוֹם יוֹסֵף גֻּבְרָא דְּמִטַּמְרָן גָּלְיָן לֵיהּ, in Hebrew characters) [="And Pharaoh called Joseph's name The man unto whom hidden things are revealed"], instead of "And Pharaoh called Joseph's name Zaphenath-paneah."
- (Genesis 43:16) (Aramaic: אֲרֵי עִמִּי אָכְלִין גּוּבְרַיָּא בְּשֵׁירוּתָא, in Hebrew characters) [="...for these men shall dine with me during the late afternoon meal"], instead of "...for these men shall dine with me at noon."
- (Genesis 45:27) (Aramaic: וַחֲזָא יָת עֶגְלָתָא וכו' וּשְׁרָת רוּחַ קוּדְשָׁא עַל יַעֲקֹב אֲבוּהוֹן, in Hebrew characters) [="and when he saw the wagons, etc., a holy spirit came over Jacob their father"], instead of "...the spirit of Jacob their father revived."
- (Genesis 49:9) (Aramaic: שִׁלְטוֹן יְהֵי בְשֵׁירוּיָא וּבְסוֹפָא יִתְרַבַּא מַלְכָּא מִדְּבֵית יְהוּדָה, in Hebrew characters) [="A [mere] governor he shall be in the beginning, but in the end he shall be anointed king from the House of Judah"], instead of "Judah is a lion's cub"
- (Genesis 49:15) (Aramaic: וַחֲזָא חוּלָקָא אֲרֵי טָב וְיָת אַרְעֵיהּ אֲרֵי מַעְבְּדָא פֵירִין, in Hebrew characters) [="And he saw the portion that it was good, and his land that it was bountiful"], instead of "And he saw that rest was good, and the land that it was pleasant"
- (Exodus 1:8) (Aramaic: וְקָם מַלְכָּא חֲדַתָּא עַל מִצְרָיִם דְּלָא מְקַיּיֵם גְּזֵירַת יוֹסֵף, in Hebrew characters), [= "And there arose a new king in Egypt who did not fulfill Joseph's decrees."], instead of "And there arose a new king in Egypt who knew not Joseph."
- (Exodus 4:25) (Aramaic: וַאֲמַרַת בִּדְמָא דִּמְהוּלְתָּא הָדֵין אִתְיְהֵב חַתְנָא לַנָא, in Hebrew characters), [= "...and she said, 'By the blood of this circumcision the groomed infant has been given to us'." (i.e. the child was on the verge of dying until he was circumcised)], instead of "...and she said, 'Surely a bloody husband are you to me'."
- (Exodus 13:18) (Aramaic: וּמְזָרְזִין סְלִיקוּ בְּנֵי יִשְׂרָאֵל מֵאַרְעָא דְּמִצְרָיִם, in Hebrew characters), [= "...and, being hastened, the children of Israel went up out of the land of Egypt."], instead of "...and the children of Israel went up out of the land of Egypt equipped for battle."
- (Exodus 14:8) (Aramaic: וּבְנֵי יִשְׂרָאֵל נָפְקִין בְּרֵישׁ גְּלֵי, in Hebrew characters), [= "...and the children of Israel went out openly."], instead of "...and the children of Israel went out with an high hand."
- (Exodus 18:10) (Aramaic: בְּרִיךְ יי' דְּשֵׁיזֵיב יָתְכוֹן מִיְּדָא דְּמִצְרָאֵי וּמִיְּדָא דְּפַרְעֹה, דְּשֵׁיזֵיב יָת עַמָּא מִתְּחוֹת מַרְוַת מִצְרָאֵי, in Hebrew characters), [= "...Blessed be the Lord, who has delivered you out of the hand of the Egyptians, and out of the hand of Pharaoh, who has delivered the people from under the dominion of the Egyptians."], instead of "...Blessed be the Lord, who has delivered you out of the hand of Egypt, and out of the hand of Pharaoh, who has delivered the people from under the hand of Egypt."
- (Exodus 22:28 [27]) (Aramaic: דַּיָּינָא לָא תַקִיל, in Hebrew characters) [= "You shall not have a judge in contempt"], instead of "You shall not revile the gods."
- (Exodus 23:5) (Aramaic: אֲרֵי תִחְזֵי חֲמָרָא דְּסָנְאָךְ רְבִיַע תְּחוֹת טוּעְנֵיהּ וְתִתְמְנַע מִלְּמִשְׁקַל לֵיהּ מִשְׁבָּק תִּשְׁבּוֹק מָא דִּבְלִבָּךְ עֲלוֹהִי וּתְפָרֵיק עִמֵּיהּ, in Hebrew characters) [="If you see the donkey of one who is hated by you fallen down under its load, and you have since refrained from interacting with him, lay aside what is in your heart against him, and unload [the burden] with him."], instead of "...and you would forbear to help him, you shall surely help with him."
- (Exodus 23:19) (Aramaic: לָא תֵיכְלוּן בְּשַׂר בַּחֲלַב, in Hebrew characters), [= "...You shall not eat flesh with milk."], instead of "...You shall not seethe a kid [of the goats] in its mother's milk."
- (Exodus 35:7) (Aramaic: וּמַשְׁכֵּי דְּדִכְרֵי מְסַמְּקֵי וּמַשְׁכֵּי סָסְגוֹנָא, וְאָעֵי שִׁטִּין, in Hebrew characters), [= "And rams' skins dyed red, and skins dyed blue, and shittim wood."], instead of "And rams' skins dyed red, and badgers' skins and shittim wood."
- (Leviticus 13:45) (Aramaic: וְעַל שָׂפָם כַּאֲבִילָא יִתְעַטַּף וְלָא תִסְתָּאֲבוּ וְלָא תִסְתָּאֲבוּ יִקְרֵי, in Hebrew characters) [= "...and he shall cover-up his moustache like a mourner, [whereas] let one cry Be not defiled [by him]! Be not defiled!"], instead of "...and he shall put a covering upon his upper lip, and shall cry, Unclean, unclean."
- (Leviticus 19:32) (Aramaic: מִן קֳדָם דְּסָבַר בְּאוֹרָיְתָא תְּקוּם, in Hebrew characters) [= "You shall stand up before him that is learned in the Torah..."], instead of "You shall stand up before the gray head..."
- (Leviticus 23:43) (Aramaic: בְּדִיל דְּיִדְּעוּן דָּרֵיכוֹן אֲרֵי בִּמְטַלַּת עֲנָנִי אוֹתֵיבִית יָת בְּנֵי יִשְׂרָאֵל, in Hebrew characters) [="That your generations may know that I made the children of Israel to dwell in the shade of my cloud, etc."], instead of "That your generations may know that I made the children of Israel to dwell in booths, etc."
- (Numbers 15:15) (Aramaic: קְהָלָא קְיָמָא חַד לְכוֹן וּלְגִיּוֹרַיָּא דְּיִתְגַּיְּירוּן, in Hebrew characters), [= "One ordinance shall be both for you of the congregation, and also for the proselytes that sojourn with you"], instead of "...and also for the stranger that sojourns with you."
- (Numbers 12:1) (Aramaic: וּמַלֵּילַת מִרְיָם וְאַהֲרֹן בְּמֹשֶׁה עַל עֵיסַק אִתְּתָא שַׁפִּירְתָא דִּנְסֵיב אֲרֵי אִתְּתָא שַׁפִּירְתָא דִּנְסֵיב רַחֵיק, in Hebrew characters), [= "And Miriam and Aaron spoke out against Moses concerning the beautiful woman whom he took [in marriage], for the beautiful woman whom he had taken [in marriage] he had distanced (from himself)."], instead of "...spoke out against Moses concerning the Ethiopian woman whom he had married, etc."
- (Deuteronomy 20:19) (Aramaic: אֲרֵי לָא כֶאֱנָשָׁא אִילָן חַקְלָא לְמֵיעַל מִן קֳדָמָךְ בִּצְיָרָא, in Hebrew characters), [= "...for a tree of the field is not like unto man to remove himself from you during a siege."], instead of "...for the tree of the field is man's life to employ them in the siege."
- (Deuteronomy 21:12) (Aramaic: וְתַעֲלִנַּהּ לְגוֹ בֵיתָךְ וּתְגַלַּח יָת רֵישַׁהּ וּתְרַבֵּי יָת טוּפְרַהָא, in Hebrew characters), [= "and you shall bring her home to your house, and she shall shave her head and let her fingernails grow out."], instead of "and you shall bring her home to your house, and she shall shave her head and pare her nails."
- (Deuteronomy 22:5) (Aramaic:לָא יְהֵי תִּקּוּן זֵין דִּגְבַר עַל אִתָּא, in Hebrew characters) [= "Let no man's ornament of war (weapon) be put on a woman"], instead of "A woman shall not wear that which pertains unto a man."
- (Deuteronomy 23:18) (Aramaic: לָא תְהֵי אִתְּתָא מִבְּנָת יִשְׂרָאֵל לִגְבַר עֶבֶד וְלָא יִסַּב גּוּבְרָא מִבְּנֵי יִשְׂרָאֵל אִתָּא אָמָא, in Hebrew characters) [= "There shall not be a woman of the daughters of Israel married to a man who is a slave; nor shall a man of the sons of Israel be married to a woman who is a maidservant"], instead of "There shall be no whore of the daughters of Israel, nor a sodomite of the sons of Israel."
- (Deuteronomy 33:6) (Aramaic:יֵיחֵי רְאוּבֵן בְּחַיֵי עָלְמָא וּמוֹתָא תִּנְיָנָא לָא יְמוּת, in Hebrew characters) [="May Reuben live with eternal life and may he not die a second death"], instead of "Let Reuben live, and not die, etc."

== Sources ==
- N. Adler, "Netinah La-Ger" (Heb.)
- S. D. Luzzatto, "Oheiv Ha-Ger" (Heb.)
- Maimonides, The Guide for the Perplexed (English) OCLC 1031721874
- N. Samet, "The Distinction Between Holy and Profane in Targum Onkelos" (Heb.), Megadim 43 (2005), pp. 73-86.
