= Hebrew dialects =

There are several dialects of the Hebrew language, both past and present.

Spoken dialects:

- Modern Hebrew
- Ashkenazi Hebrew
- Sephardi Hebrew
- Mizrahi Hebrew
- Yemenite Hebrew
- Tiberian Hebrew
- Italian Hebrew
- Medieval Hebrew
- Mishnaic Hebrew
- Biblical Hebrew
- Israelian Hebrew

Written dialects:

- Tiberian vocalization
- Babylonian vocalization
- Palestinian vocalization
- Samaritan Hebrew
