= Shlomo Morag =

Israeli linguist (1926–1999)

- שלמה מורג
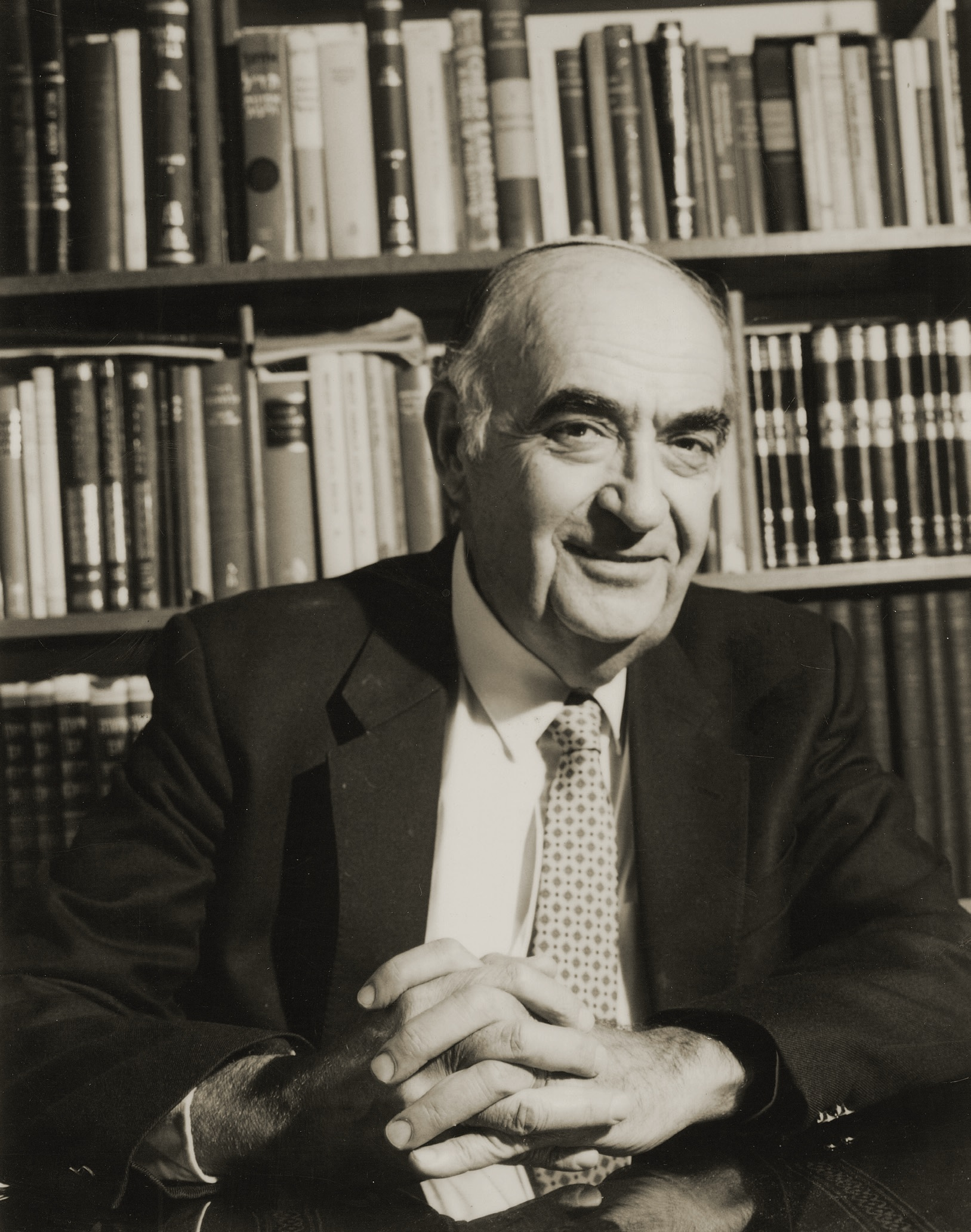
- Born: July 17, 1926; Petah Tikva, Mandatory Palestine
- Died: September 4, 1999 (aged 73); Jerusalem, Israel
- Awards: The Israel Prize, the Bialik Prize
- Scientific career
- Fields: Semitic linguistics, Jewish studies
- Institutions: The Hebrew University of Jerusalem

Shlomo Morag, also spelled Shelomo Morag (Hebrew: שלמה מורג; July 17, 1926 – September 4, 1999), was an Israeli professor at the department of Hebrew Language at the Hebrew University of Jerusalem. Morag founded the Jewish Oral Traditions Research Center at the Hebrew University and served as the head of Ben Zvi Institute for the study of Jewish communities in the East for several years. He was a member of the Academy of the Hebrew Language and the Israel Academy of Sciences and Humanities, and a fellow of the American Academy of Jewish Research.

== Family ==
Morag was born in Petah Tikva, in Mandate Palestine in 1926. Both his parents were teachers at Netzah Israel religious school in Petah Tikva. The family later moved to Ramat Gan, where Morag grew up and his younger brother Amotz was born.

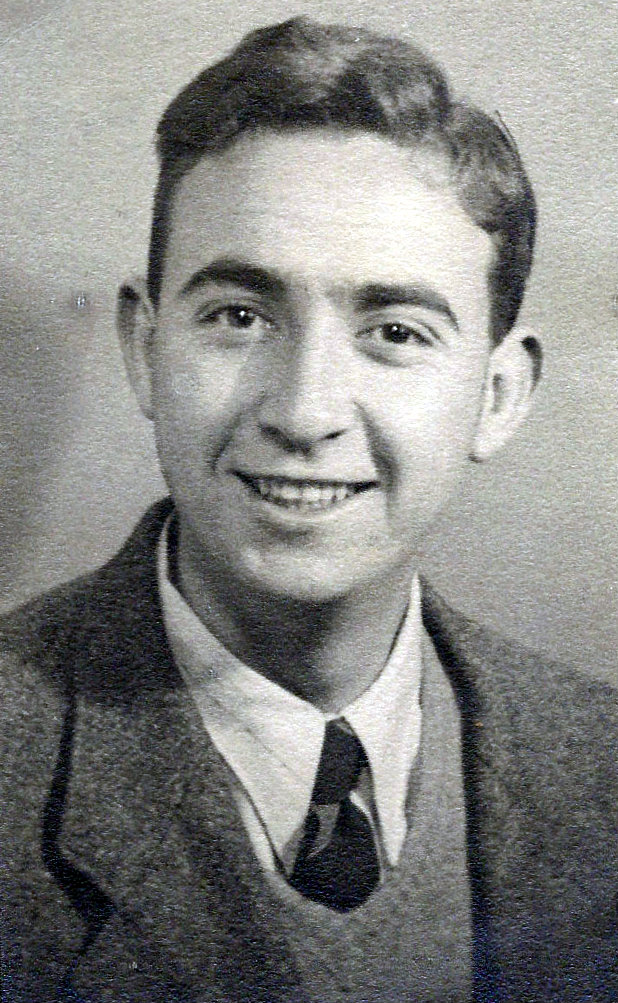
Young Shlomo Morag

Shlomo Morag's father, Rabbi Moshe Aryeh Mirkin, wrote an 11 volume commentary of Genesis Rabbah. Morag's mother, Sarah Mirkin (née Margalit) founded charitable organizations for the benefit of children and women immigrants. She was elected as head of WIZO's branch in Ramat Gan, from which she resigned after struggling for equal voting rights for women, and not only for separate women's parties. She joined the General Zionists' women organization and from 1954 she served as a member of Ramat Gan's city council. Shlomo Morag dedicated his book, "the Hebrew Language Tradition of the Yemenite Jews", to his parents.

Shlomo Morag's brother, Amotz Morag, was a professor of Economics and wrote for the Davar and Ashmoret newspapers. He wrote articles and books on economic issues. He also wrote short stories, some of which were collected after his death by Shlomo Morag.

== Academic career ==
Morag commenced studying at the Hebrew University in Jerusalem in 1943. In 1955 he received his PhD for his thesis on the Hebrew pronunciation of the Yemenite Jews, which he wrote under the supervision of his teachers, Shelomo Dov Goitein, Hans Jakob Polotsky and Naftali Herz Tur-Sinai. Other teachers who influenced him were Joseph Klausner, David Baneth and Hanoch Yelon.

He later joined the faculty of the Hebrew University and served as a professor at the department of Hebrew Language until he retired in 1994. Morag taught at Tel Aviv University and Bar-Ilan University as well.

Morag's works focus on Semitic linguistics and specifically on the Hebrew language. He researched the oral traditions of Hebrew and dedicated a major part of his work to the oral traditions of the Yemenite Jews: the Yemenite Hebrew and the Yemenite Aramaic traditions.

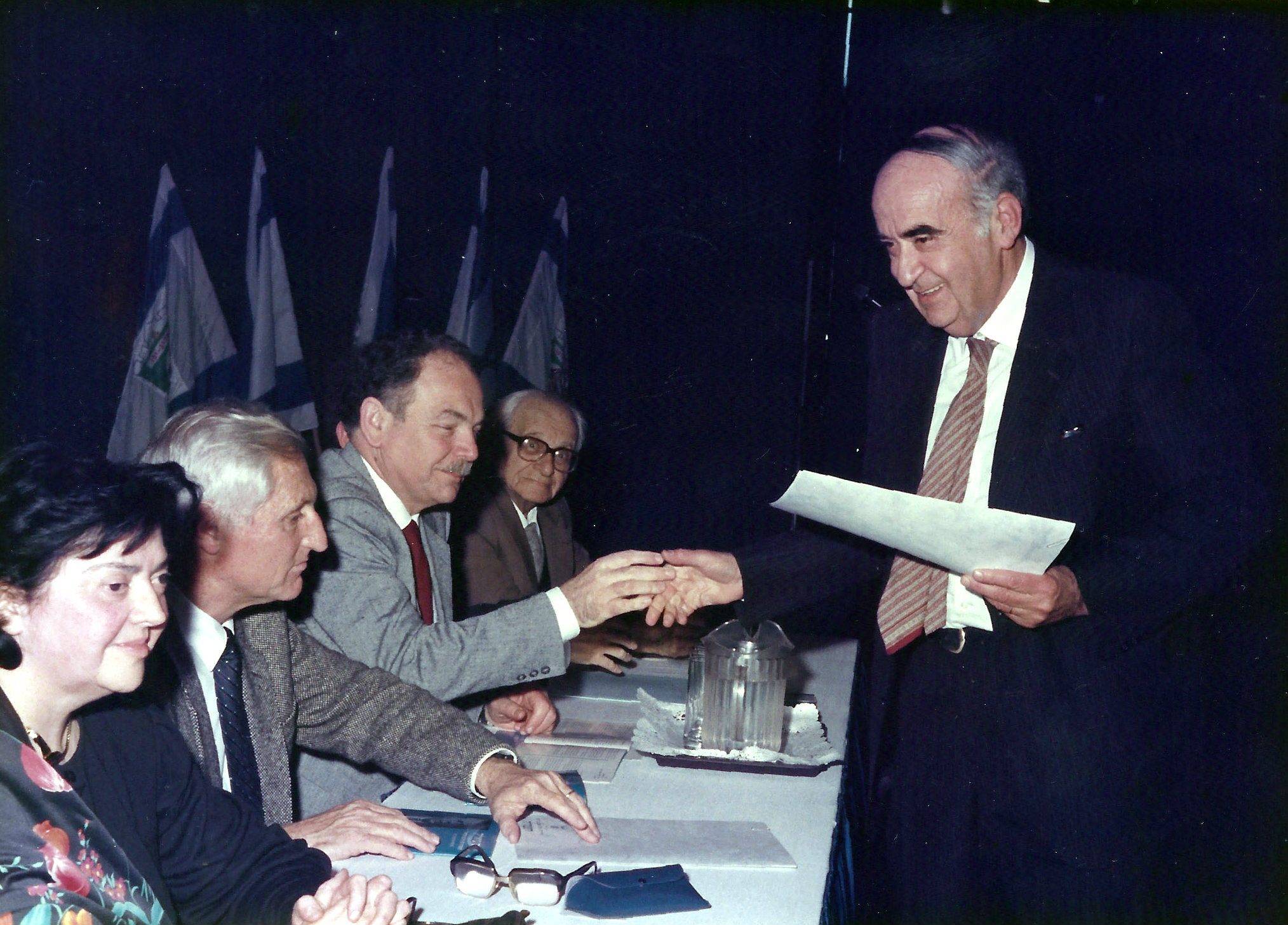
Shlomo Morag receiving the Bialik Prize

=== Awards ===
- In 1966, Morag was awarded the Israel Prize in Jewish studies, for his book "The Hebrew Language Tradition of the Yemenite Jews". He was the youngest person to receive this prize at the time.
- In 1989, he was the co-recipient (jointly with Shmuel Abramski) of the Bialik Prize for Jewish thought. He received the prize for his book "Babylonian Aramaic: The Yemenite Tradition".

== Works ==
=== The Hebrew Language Tradition of the Yemenite Jews ===
The base for this book, for which Morag received the Israel Prize, was his PhD thesis. In this book he describes the Yemenite Hebrew, the traditional reading of the bible and the Mishnah.

Morag distinguishes the Yemenite tradition from other Hebrew oral traditions for several reasons:

- It is the only tradition that has a clear affinity to the Babylonian Hebrew tradition. This affinity is manifested in characteristics such as the use of one vowel whereas the Tiberian Hebrew tradition differentiate two vowels: patach and segol.
- It is the only oral tradition that regularly differentiates between the Biblical Hebrew tradition, which generally adheres to the Tiberian tradition (though influenced by the Babylonian tradition that was previously the accepted tradition in Yemen), and the Mishnaic Hebrew tradition, which is mostly Babylonian (but influenced from the Tiberian tradition of the Bible).
- This tradition maintains distinctions that were lost in other oral traditions, such as the Begadkefat phenomenon and the pronunciation of shva na.

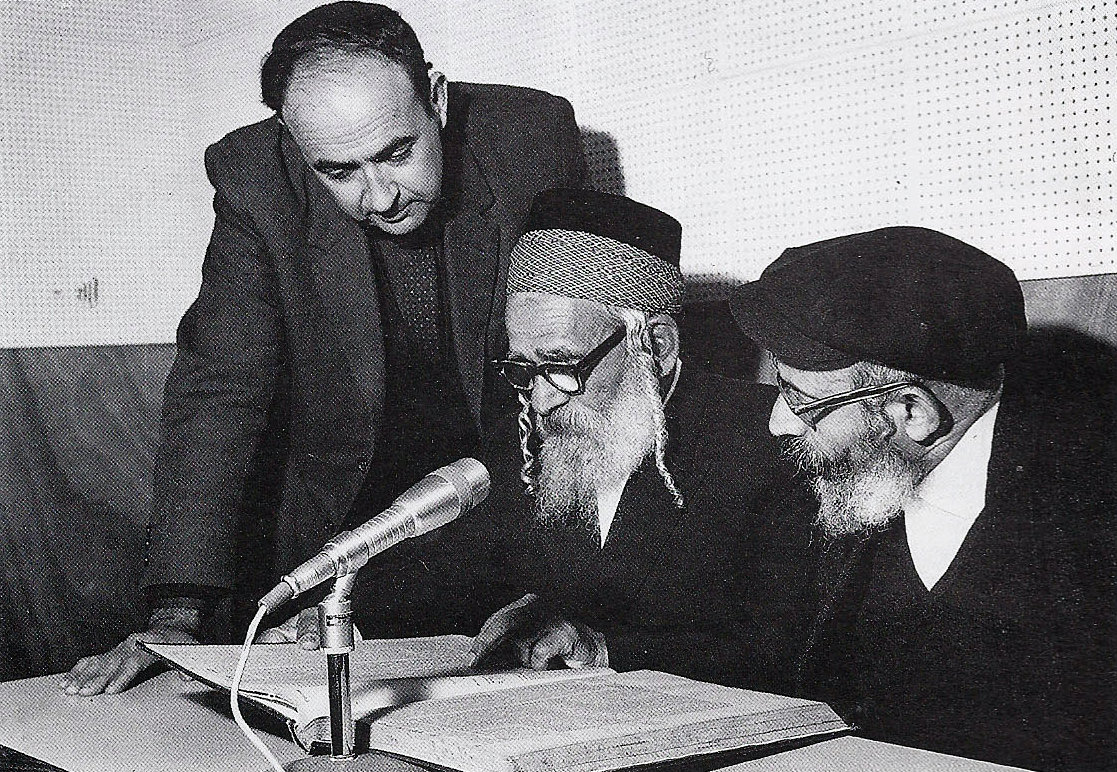
Shlomo Morag recording two Yemenite rabbis for the Jewish Oral Traditions Research Center

In his book, Morag describes the phonetic and phonological characteristics of the Yemenite tradition, and examines the effects of different Yemeni Arabic dialects on the oral traditions of Yemenite Jews from different areas of Yemen.

=== Babylonian Aramaic: The Yemenite Tradition ===
This book, for which Morag was awarded the Bialik Prize, describes the phonology and morphology of the Yemenite tradition of the Aramaic of the Babylonian Talmud. The book is based on the reading tradition of Sana'ani Jews, as recorded mainly at the Jewish Oral Traditions Research Center at the Hebrew University which Morag founded.

According to Shlomo Morag, the Yemenite tradition is the best reading tradition of the Jewish Babylonian Aramaic:

- Its transmission is reliable and it preserved the phonological and morphological characteristics distinguishing it from reading traditions of texts in other Aramaic dialects: Targum Onkelos and Targum Jonathan.
- There is a considerable correspondence between this tradition and the tradition of an important manuscript of the book Halachot Psukot, which exhibits a rather archaic tradition and uses the Babylonian vocalization. This correspondence also demonstrates the Babylonian elements in the Yemenite tradition.

In his book, Morag brings evidence against the claim that the Talmud was not commonly taught in Yemen, and points out the Yemenite manuscripts of the Babylonian Talmud and their value for determining the characteristics of the Yemenite tradition.

== See also ==
- List of Israel Prize recipients
