= Hebrew accents =

This disambiguation page is on grammatical Hebrew accents. For dialects, see Hebrew dialects (disambiguation).

Gen. 1:9 And God said, "Let the waters be collected". Letters in black, niqqud in red, cantillation in blue

There are two types of Hebrew accents that go on Hebrew letters:

- Niqqud, a system of diacritical signs used to represent vowels or distinguish between alternative pronunciations of letters
- Hebrew cantillation, used for the ritual chanting of readings from the Bible in synagogue services
