= Sephardi Hebrew =

Sephardic Jewish pronunciation system for Biblical Hebrew

Sephardi Hebrew (or Sepharadi Hebrew; Hebrew: עברית ספרדית, romanized: Ivrit Sefardit, Ladino: Ebreo de los Sefaradim) is the pronunciation system for Biblical Hebrew favored for liturgical use by Sephardi Jews. Its phonology was influenced by contact languages such as Spanish and Portuguese, Judaeo-Spanish (Ladino), Judeo-Arabic dialects, and Modern Greek.

== Phonology ==
There is some variation between the various forms of Sephardi Hebrew, but the following generalizations may be made:

- The stress tends to fall on the last syllable wherever that is the case in Biblical Hebrew.
- The letter ע (ʿayin) is realized as a sound, but the specific sound varies between communities. One pronunciation associated with the Hebrew of the Spanish and Portuguese Jews ('Western Sephardim') is a velar nasal ([ŋ]) sound, as in English singing, but other Sephardim of the Balkans, Anatolia, North Africa, and the Levant maintain the pharyngeal sound of Yemenite Hebrew or Arabic of their regional coreligionists.
- /r/ is invariably alveolar trill or tap (like Spanish r), rather than uvular (the r common to several German and Yiddish dialects, or better known as the French r).
- /t/ and /d/ are more often realized as dentals rather than alveolars.
- There is always a phonetic distinction between taw with rafe ת and samekh ס.
- Sephardi varieties observe the Kimhian five-vowel system (a e i o u), either with or without distinctions of vowel length:
  - Tsere is pronounced [e(ː)], not [ei] as may be found in Ashkenazi Hebrew
  - Holam is pronounced [o(ː)], not [au] or [oi] as may be found in Ashkenazi Hebrew
  - Kamats gadol is pronounced [a(ː)], not [ɔ] as in Ashkenazi, Yemenite, or Tiberian Hebrew

This last difference is the standard shibboleth for distinguishing Sephardi from Ashkenazi, Yemenite, and Tiberian Hebrew. The differentiation between kamatz gadol and kamatz katan is made according to purely phonetic rules, without regard to etymology, which occasionally leads to spelling pronunciations at variance with the rules laid down in Biblical Hebrew grammar books. For example, כָל (all), when unhyphenated, is pronounced "kal", rather than "kol" (in "kal 'atsmotai" and "Kal Nidre"), and צָהֳרַיִם (noon) is pronounced "tsahorayim", rather than "tsohorayim". This feature is also found in Mizrahi Hebrew, but is not found in Israeli Hebrew. It is represented in the transliteration of proper names in King James Version, such as "Naomi", "Aholah" and "Aholibamah".

=== Letter pronunciation ===
Consonants

Name	Alef	Bet	Gimel	Dalet	He	Vav	Zayin	Ḥet	Tet	Yod	Kaf	Lamed	Mem	Nun	Samech	Ayin	Pe	Tzadi	Kof	Resh	Shin	Tav
Letter	א	ב	ג	ד	ה	ו	ז	ח	ט	י	כ	ל	מ	נ	ס	ע	פ	צ	ק	ר	ש	ת
Pronunciation	[ʔ], ∅	[b], [v]	[g], [ɣ]	[d̪]~[ð]	[h], ∅	[v], [w]	[z]	[ħ]	[t̪]	[j]	[k], [x]	[l]	[m]	[n̪]	[s]	[ʕ], [ŋ], ∅	[p], [f]	[s]	[k]	[ɾ]~[r]	[ʃ], [s]	[t̪]~[θ]

Vowels

Name	Shva Nach	Shva Na	Patach	Hataf Patach	Kamatz Gadol	Kamatz Katan	Hataf Kamatz	Tzere, Tzere Male	Segol	Hataf Segol	Hiriq	Hiriq Male	Holam and Holam Male	Kubutz	Shuruk
Letter	ְ	ְ	ַ	ֲ	ָ	ָ	ֳ	ֵ , ֵי	ֶ	ֱ	ִ	ִי	ׂ, וֹ	ֻ	וּ
Pronunciation	∅	[ɛ]~[e̞]	[a]~[ä]	[a]~[ä]	[ä(ː)]	[ɔ]	[ɔ]	[e(ː)]	[ɛ]~[e̞]	[ɛ]~[e̞]	[e]~[ɪ]~[i]	[i(ː)]	[o(ː)], [o(ː)]~[u(ː)]	[o]~[ʊ]~[u]	[u(ː)], [o]~[ʊ]~[u]

== Variants ==
Sephardim differ on the pronunciation of bet raphe (ב, bet without dagesh). Persian, Moroccan, Greek, Turkish, Balkan and Jerusalem Sephardim usually pronounce it as [v], which is reflected in Modern Hebrew. Spanish and Portuguese Jews traditionally pronounced it as [b ~ β] (as do most Mizrahi Jews), but that is declining under the influence of Israeli Hebrew.

That may reflect changes in the pronunciation of Spanish. In Medieval Spanish (and in Judaeo-Spanish), b and v were separate, with b representing a voiced bilabial stop and v realized as a bilabial fricative [β]. However, in Renaissance and modern Spanish, both are pronounced [β] (bilabial v) after a vowel (or continuant) and [b] otherwise (such as after a pause).

There is also a difference in the pronunciation of tau raphe (ת, tau without dagesh):

- The normal Sephardi pronunciation (reflected in Israeli Hebrew) is as an unvoiced dental plosive ([t]);
- Greek Sephardim (like some Mizrahi Jews, such as Iraqis and Yemenites) pronounced it as a voiceless dental fricative ([θ]);
- Some Spanish and Portuguese Jews and Sephardim from the Spanish-Moroccan tradition pronounce it as a voiced dental plosive [d] or fricative [ð] (see lenition).

Closely related to the Sephardi pronunciation is the Italian pronunciation of Hebrew, which may be regarded as a variant.

In communities from Italy, Greece and Turkey, he is not realized as [h] but as a silent letter because of the influence of Italian, Judaeo-Spanish and (to a lesser extent) Modern Greek, all of which lack the sound. That was also the case in early transliterations of Spanish-Portuguese manuscripts (Ashkibenu, as opposed to Hashkibenu), but he is now consistently pronounced in those communities. Basilectal Modern Hebrew also shares that characteristic, but it is considered substandard.

In addition to ethnic and geographical distinctions, there are some distinctions of register. Popular Sephardic pronunciation, such as for Spanish and Portuguese Jews, makes no distinction between pataḥ and qameṣ gadol [a], or between segol, ṣere and shewa na [e]: that is inherited from the old Palestinian vowel notation. In formal liturgical use, however, many Sephardim are careful to make some distinction between these vowels to reflect the Tiberian notation. (That can be compared to the attempts of some Ashkenazim to use the pharyngeal sounds of ḥet and ayin in formal contexts, such as reading the Torah.)

== History ==
In brief, Sephardi Hebrew appears to be a descendant of the Palestinian tradition, partially adapted to accommodate the Tiberian notation and further influenced by the pronunciation of Judeo-Arabic dialects and Judaeo-Spanish (Ladino).

The origins of the different Hebrew reading traditions reflect older differences between the pronunciations of Hebrew and Middle Aramaic current in different parts of the Fertile Crescent: Judea, the Galilee, Greater Syria, Upper Mesopotamia, and Lower Mesopotamia ("Babylonia"), and this is represented by the Palestinian vocalization and the Palestino-Tiberian vocalization systems. In the time of the Masoretes (8th-10th centuries), there were three distinct notations for denoting vowels and other details of pronunciation in biblical and liturgical texts. One was the Babylonian; another was the Palestinian; still another was Tiberian Hebrew, which eventually superseded the other two and is still in use today. By the time of Saadia Gaon and Jacob Qirqisani, Palestinian Hebrew had come to be regarded as standard, even in Babylonia. That development roughly coincided with the popularization of the Tiberian notation.

The Palestinian pronunciation also reached the Jewish communities in Europe, North Africa and most of the Middle East, and in Iran and Iraq, it replaced the Babylonian pronunciation. It may have been disseminated in the Middle East by Sephardi teachers after the expulsions from Spain and Portugal. According to Shlomo Morag, there is evidence of the use of the Babylonian pronunciation in Spain in the early Middle Ages, possibly brought there by teachers from Babylonia.

The accepted rules of Hebrew grammar were laid down in medieval Spain by grammarians such as Judah ben David Hayyuj and Jonah ibn Janah and later restated in a modified form by the Kimhi family; the current Sephardic pronunciation largely reflects the system that it laid down. By then, the Tiberian notation was universally used though it was not always reflected in pronunciation. The Spanish grammarians accepted the rules laid down by the Tiberian Masoretes, with the following variations:

1. The traditional Sephardic pronunciation of the vowels (inherited, as it seems, from the old Palestinian system) was perpetuated. Their failure to fit the Tiberian notation was rationalized by the theory that the distinctions between Tiberian symbols represented differences of length rather than quality: pataẖ was short a, qamats was long a, segol was short e and tsere was long e.
2. The theory of long and short vowels was also used to adapt Hebrew to the rules of Arabic poetic meter. For example, in Arabic (and Persian) poetry, when a long vowel occurs in a closed syllable an extra (short) syllable is treated as present for metrical purposes but is not represented in pronunciation. Similarly, in Sephardic Hebrew a shewa after a syllable with a long vowel is invariably treated as vocal. (In Tiberian Hebrew, that is true only when the long vowel is marked with a meteg.)

There are further differences:

- Sephardim now pronounce shewa na as /e/ in all positions, but the older rules (as in the Tiberian system) were more complicated.
- Resh is invariably pronounced by Sephardim as a "front" alveolar trill; in the Tiberian system, the pronunciation appears to have varied with the context and so it was treated as a letter with a double (sometimes triple) pronunciation.

== Influence on Israeli Hebrew ==
When Eliezer Ben-Yehuda, Yehuda Gur (Grozovski), David Yellin, and other activists for the Revival of the Hebrew language drafted the standard for the new spoken language, they based it on Sephardi Hebrew, both because this was the de facto spoken form as a lingua franca in the land of Israel and because most of them believed it to be the most correct of the Hebrew dialects. However, the phonology of Modern Hebrew is in some respects constrained to that of Ashkenazi Hebrew, including the elimination of pharyngeal articulation and the conversion of /r/ from an alveolar tap to a voiced uvular fricative, though this latter sound was rare in Ashkenazi Hebrew, in which uvular realizations were more commonly a trill or tap, and in which alveolar trills or taps were also common.
