= Mishnaic Hebrew =

Hebrew dialects found in the Talmud

- לְשׁוֹן חָזָ"ל, Ləšôn Ḥāzāl
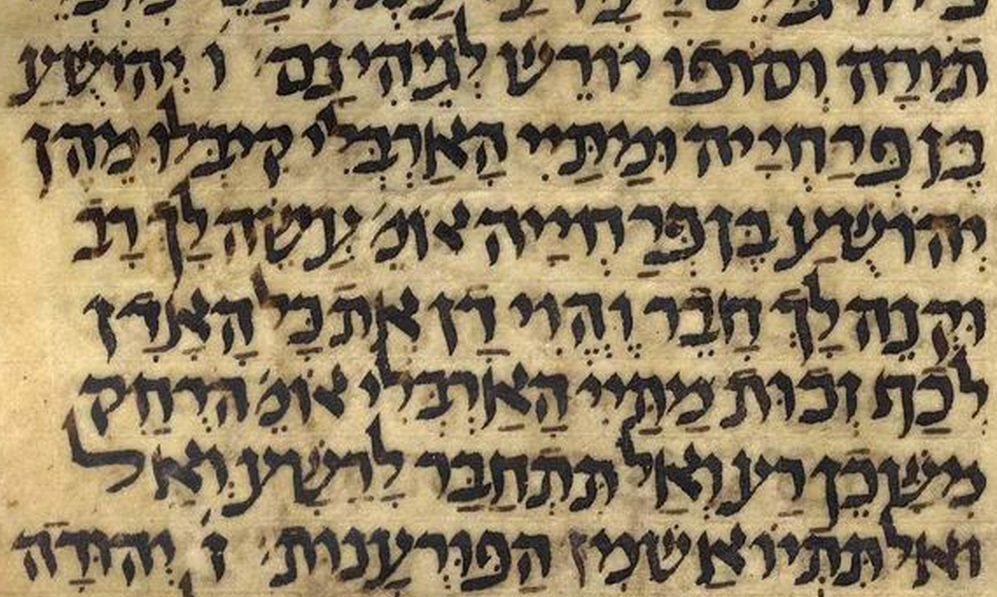
- A section of the Mishnah
- Region: Judaea, Syria Palaestina
- Era: Developed from Biblical Hebrew in the 1st century CE; continued as Medieval Hebrew as an academic language after dying out as a spoken native language in the 4th century
- Language family: Afro-Asiatic: Semitic; West; Central; Northwest; Canaanite; South; Hebrew; Mishnaic Hebrew
- Early form: Biblical Hebrew
- Writing system: Hebrew alphabet

Language codes
- ISO 639-3: –
- Glottolog: None

Mishnaic Hebrew (Hebrew: לְשׁוֹן חָזָ״ל, romanized: Ləšôn Ḥāzāl, lit. 'Language of the Sages') is the Hebrew language used in Talmudic texts. Mishnaic Hebrew can be divided into: Mishnaic Hebrew proper (c. 1–200 CE, also called Tannaitic Hebrew, Early Rabbinic Hebrew, or Mishnaic Hebrew I), which was a spoken language; and Amoraic Hebrew (c. 200 to 500 CE, also called Late Rabbinic Hebrew or Mishnaic Hebrew II), which was a literary language only.

The Mishnaic Hebrew language, or Early Rabbinic Hebrew language, is one of the direct ancient descendants of Biblical Hebrew as preserved after the Babylonian captivity, and definitively recorded by Jewish sages in writing the Mishnah and other contemporary documents.

A transitional form of the language occurs in the other works of Tannaitic literature dating from the century beginning with the completion of the Mishnah. These include the halakhic midrashim (Sifra, Sifre, Mekhilta of Rabbi Ishmael, etc.) and the expanded collection of Mishnah-related material known as the Tosefta. The Talmud contains excerpts from these works and further Tannaitic material not attested elsewhere; the generic term for these passages is baraitot. The language of all these works is very similar to Mishnaic Hebrew.

== Historical occurrence ==
Mishnaic Hebrew is found primarily from the first to the fourth centuries, corresponding to the Roman period after the destruction of the Second Temple in the Siege of Jerusalem (70 CE). It developed under the profound influence of Middle Aramaic. Also called Tannaitic Hebrew or Early Rabbinic Hebrew, it is represented by the bulk of the Mishnah (משנה, published around 200) and the Tosefta within the Talmud, and by some of the Dead Sea Scrolls, notably the Copper Scroll and the Bar Kokhba Letters.

Archaeologist Yigael Yadin mentions that three Bar Kokhba revolt documents he and his team found in the Cave of Letters are written in Mishnaic Hebrew and that it was Simon bar Kokhba who revived Hebrew and made it the official language of the state during the revolt (132–135). Yadin also notes a shift from Aramaic to Hebrew in Judea during the time of the Bar Kokhba revolt:

It is interesting that the earlier documents are written in Aramaic while the later ones are in Hebrew. Possibly the change was made by a special decree of Bar-Kokhba who wanted to restore Hebrew as the official language of the state.

Sigalit Ben-Zion remarks, "[I]t seems that this change came as a result of the order that was given by Bar Kokhba, who wanted to revive the Hebrew language and make it the official language of the state."

However, less than a century after the publication of the Mishnah, Hebrew began to fall into disuse as a spoken language. The Gemara (גמרא, circa 500 in Lower Mesopotamia), as well as the earlier Jerusalem Talmud published between 350 and 400, generally comment on the Mishnah and Baraitot in Middle Aramaic. Nevertheless, Hebrew survived as a liturgical and literary language in the form of later Amoraic Hebrew, which sometimes occurs in the Gemara text.

There is general agreement that two main periods of Rabbinical Hebrew (RH) can be distinguished. The first, which lasted until the close of the Tannaitic era (around the year 200), is characterized by RH as a spoken language gradually developing into a literary medium, in which the Mishnah, Tosefta, baraitot and Tannaitic midrashim would be composed. The second stage begins with the Amoraim, and sees RH being replaced by Aramaic as the spoken vernacular, surviving only as a literary language.

== Phonology ==
Many of the characteristic features of Mishnaic Hebrew pronunciation may have already been found in the Late Biblical Hebrew period. A notable characteristic distinguishing it from Biblical Hebrew of the classical period is begadkefat, the spirantization of the post-vocalic stops b, g, d, p, t, and k, which it has in common with Aramaic.

While this process began in Aramaic as early as the 7th century BCE, spirantisation in Hebrew was a much later process. The spirantisation of p and b happened early in the Second Temple period, followed by t and d at some later point. The appearance of fricativised k and g only happened in Amoraic Hebrew. It did not appear before the merger of the consonants [ḫ] with [ḥ] and [ġ] with [ʿ] by the 1st century. Samaritan Hebrew, which split off from Judean and Galilean varieties in the Roman period, did not undergo fricativisation of k and g at all.

A new characteristic is that final /m/ is often replaced with final /n/ in the Mishna (see Bava Kamma 1:4, "מועדין"), but only in agreement morphemes. Perhaps the final nasal consonant in the morphemes was not pronounced, and the vowel previous to it was nasalized. Alternatively, the agreement morphemes may have changed under the influence of Aramaic.

Some surviving manuscripts of the Mishna confuse guttural consonants, especially aleph (א) (a glottal stop) and ʿayin (ע) (a voiced pharyngeal fricative). That could signify that they were pronounced the same way in Amoraic Hebrew. Loss of a distinction in these two letters as well as between heth and he are also associated with Galilean Hebrew speakers in the Tannaitic period, a source of frequent criticism by Judean writers.

=== Reconstructed Mishnaic Hebrew pronunciation ===
Consonants

Name	Alef	Bet	Gimel	Dalet	He	Vav	Zayin	Chet	Tet	Yod	Kaf	Lamed	Mem	Nun	Samech	Ayin	Pe	Tzadi	Kof	Resh	Shin	Tav
Letter	א	ב	ג	ד	ה	ו	ז	ח	ט	י	כ	ל	מ	נ	ס	ע	פ	צ	ק	ר	ש	ת
Pronunciation	[ʔ], ∅	[b], [β]	[g], [ɣ]	[d̪], [ð]	[h], ∅	[w]	[z]	[ħ]	[t̪ʼ]	[j]	[k], [x]	[l]	[m]	[n̪]	[s]	[ʕ], ∅	[p], [ɸ]	[sʼ]	[kʼ]	[ɾ]	[ʃ], [s]	[t̪], [θ]

Vowels

Name	Shva Nach	Shva Na	Patach	Hataf Patach	Kamatz Gadol	Kamatz Katan	Hataf Kamatz	Tzere, Tzere Male	Segol	Hataf Segol	Hirik	Hirik Male	Holam, Holam Male	Kubutz	Shuruk
Letter	ְ	ְ	ַ	ֲ	ָ	ָ	ֳ	ֵ , ֵי	ֶ	ֱ	ִ	ִי	ׂ, וֹ	ֻ	וּ
Pronunciation	∅	?	[æ]		[ʌː ~ ɑː]	[ɔ]		[eː]	[ɛ]		[ɪ ~ i]	[iː]	[oː]	[ʊ ~ u]	[uː]

== Morphology ==
Mishnaic Hebrew displays various changes from Biblical Hebrew, some appearing already in the Hebrew of the Dead Sea Scrolls. Some, but not all, are retained in Modern Hebrew.

For the expression of possession, Mishnaic Hebrew mostly replaces the construct state with analytic constructions involving של 'of'.

Mishnaic Hebrew lacks the waw-consecutive.

The past is expressed by using the same form as in Modern Hebrew. For example, Pirqe Avoth 1:1: משה קיבל תורה מסיני "Moses received the Torah from Sinai".

Continuous past is expressed using the past tense of "to be" + participle, unlike Biblical Hebrew. For example, Pirqe Avoth 1:2: הוא היה אומר "He often said".

Present is expressed using the same form as in Modern Hebrew, by using the participle (בינוני). For example, Pirqe Avoth 1:2 על שלושה דברים העולם עומד "The world is sustained by three things", lit. "On three things the world stands".

Future can be expressed using עתיד + infinitive. For example, Pirqe Avoth 3:1: ולפני מי אתה עתיד ליתן דין וחשבון. However, unlike Modern Hebrew but like contemporary Aramaic, the present active participle can also express the future. It mostly replaces the imperfect (prefixed) form in that function.

The imperfect (prefixed) form, which is used for the future in modern Hebrew, expresses an imperative (order), volition or similar meanings in Mishnaic Hebrew (the prefixed form is also used to express an imperative in Modern Hebrew). For example, Pirqe Avot 1:3: הוא היה אומר, אל תהיו כעבדים המשמשין את הרב "He would say, don't be like slaves serving the master...", lit. "...you will not be...". In a sense, one could say that the form pertains to the future in Mishnaic Hebrew as well, but it invariably has a modal (imperative, volitional, etc.) aspect in the main clause.

== See also ==
- Tiberian Hebrew (liturgical)
- Yemenite Hebrew (liturgical)
  - Sanaani Hebrew (liturgical)
- Sephardi Hebrew (liturgical)
- Ashkenazi Hebrew (liturgical)
- Mizrahi Hebrew (liturgical)
- Modern Hebrew (State of Israel)
