= Yemenite Hebrew =

Pronunciation system for Hebrew traditionally used by Yemenite Jews

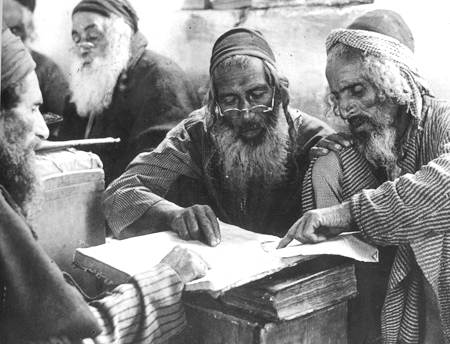
Yemenite Jewish elders rehearsing oral lessons (1906–1918)

Yemenite Hebrew (Hebrew: עִבְרִית תֵּימָנִית, romanized: ʿiḇrīṯ tēmānīṯ), also referred to as Temani Hebrew, is the pronunciation system for Hebrew traditionally used by Yemenite Jews. Yemenite Hebrew has been studied by language scholars, many of whom believe it retains older phonetic and grammatical features that have been lost elsewhere. Yemenite speakers of Hebrew are praised by language purists because of their use of grammatical features from classical Hebrew.

Some scholars, including Yosef Qafih and Abraham Isaac Kook, hold the view that Yemenite Arabic did not influence Yemenite Hebrew, as this type of Arabic was also spoken by Yemenite Jews and is distinct from the liturgical and conversational Hebrew of the communities. Among other things, Qafih noted that the Yemenite Jews spoke Arabic with a distinct Jewish flavor, inclusive of pronouncing many Arabic words with vowels foreign to the Arabic language, e.g., the qamatz (Hebrew: קָמַץ) and tzere (Hebrew: צֵירִי). He argues that the pronunciation of Yemenite Hebrew was not only uninfluenced by Arabic, but it influenced the pronunciation of Arabic by those Jews, despite the Jewish presence in Yemen for over a millennium.

== History ==
Yemenite Hebrew may have been derived from, or influenced by, the Hebrew of the Talmudic academies in Babylonia: the oldest Yemenite manuscripts use the Babylonian vocalization, which is believed to antedate the Tiberian vocalization. As late as 937, Jacob Qirqisani wrote: "The biblical readings which are wide-spread in Yemen are in the Babylonian tradition." Indeed, in many respects, such as the assimilation of paṯaḥ and səġūl, the current Yemenite pronunciation fits the Babylonian notation better than the Tiberian (though the Babylonian notation does not reflect the approximation between holam and sere in some Yemenite dialects). This is because in the Babylonian tradition of vocalization there is no distinct symbol for the səġūl. It does not follow, as claimed by some scholars, that the pronunciation of the two communities was identical, any more than the pronunciation of Sephardim and Ashkenazim is the same because both use the Tiberian symbols.

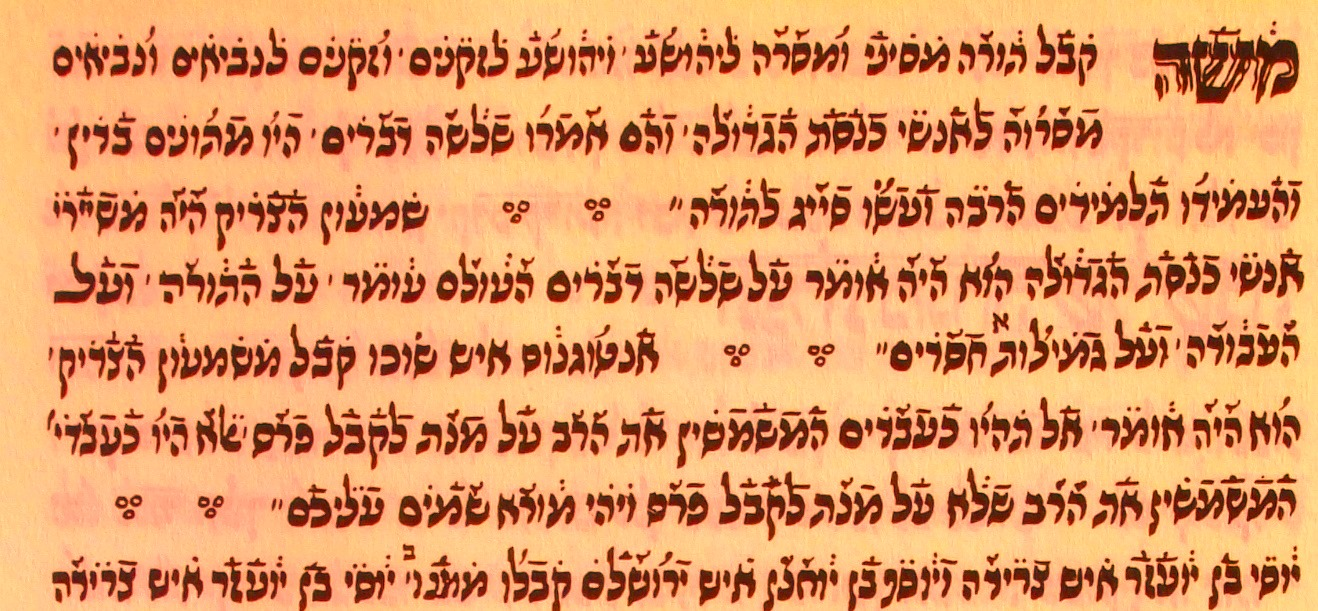
Section of Yemenite Siddur, with Babylonian supralinear punctuation (Pirke Avot)

The following chart shows the seven vowel paradigms found in the Babylonian supralinear punctuation, which are reflected to this day by the Yemenite pronunciation of Biblical lections and liturgies, though they now use the Tiberian symbols. For example, there is no separate symbol for the Tiberian səġūl and the pataḥ and amongst Yemenites they have the same phonetic sound. In this connection, the Babylonian vowel signs remained in use in Yemen long after the Babylonian Biblical tradition had been abandoned, almost until our own time.

Vowels with ב							
Tiberian equivalent	qamaṣ	paṯaḥ, (səġūl)	ṣerê	shewā mobile (šĕwā naʻ)	ḥōlam	ḥiraq	šūraq, qubbūṣ
Tiberian niqqud	בָ	בַ, בֶ	בֵ	בְ	בֹ	בִ	בֻ, בוּ
Value	/ɔː/	/æ(ː)/	/eː/	/æ(ː)/	/øː/	/i/	/u/

== Distinguishing features ==
The following chart shows the phonetic values of the Hebrew letters in the Yemenite Hebrew pronunciation tradition.

Letter	א	ב	ג	ד	ה	ו	ז	ח	ט	י	כ ך	ל	מ ם	נ ן	ס	ע	פ ף	צ ץ	ק	ר	ש	ת
IPA	[ʔ]	[b] [v]	[dʒ] [ɣ]	[d] [ð]	[h]	[w]	[z]	[ħ]	[tˤ]	[j]	[k] [x]	[l]	[m]	[n]	[s]	[ʕ]	[p] [f]	[sˤ]	[g]	[r]	[ʃ] [s]	[t] [θ]

Yemenites have preserved the sounds for each of the six double-sounding consonants: bəged-kəfet (בג״ד כפ״ת). The following are examples of their peculiar way of pronunciation of these and other letters:

- gímel/ǧimal (גּ) with the dāḡēš/dageš is pronounced /d͡ʒ/. Thus, the verse וּמִי, גּוֹי גָּדוֹל (Deut. 4:8) is realized as, u'mi, ǧoi ǧaḏol ([u'mi dʒoi dʒaðol]) (as in Sanʽani Arabic ج ǧīm /d͡ʒ/ but unlike Taʽizzi-Adeni Arabic /g/).
- gímel/gimal (ג) without dāḡēš/dageš is pronounced /ɣ/, like Arabic ġayn غ.
- dāleṯ/dal (ד) without dāḡēš/dageš is pronounced /ð/, like Arabic ḏāl ذ. Thus, the word אֶחָדֿ, 'one' in Shema Yisrael is always pronounced aḥoḏ ([æħɔð]).
- The pronunciation of tāv/taw (ת) without dāḡēš/dageš as ث /θ/ (shared by other Mizrahi Hebrew dialects such as Iraqi). Thus, Sabbath day is pronounced in Yemenite Hebrew, Yom ha-Shabboth ([jom haʃ-ʃabɔθ]).
- vāv/waw (ו) is pronounced /w/ (as in Iraqi Hebrew and و in Arabic).
- Emphatic and guttural letters have nearly the same sounds and are produced from deep in the throat, as in Arabic.
- ḥêṯ/ħet (ח) is a voiceless pharyngeal fricative, equivalent to Arabic ح /ħ/.
- ʻáyin/ʕajin (ע) is identical to Arabic ع /ʕ/, and is a voiced pharyngeal fricative. (The Sephardic pronunciation of ע, however, is of a weaker nature.)
- tsadi (צ) is not a voiceless alveolar sibilant affricate "ts" among the Yemenites, but rather a deep-sounding "s" (pharyngealized fricative).
- qof (ק) is pronounced by the Yemenites (other than the Jews from Shar'ab) as a voiced /g/, (as in Sanʽani Arabic ق gāf /g/ but unlike Taʽizzi-Adeni Arabic /q/) and is in keeping with their tradition that a different phonetic sound is given for gímel/gimal (see supra).
- resh (ר) is pronounced as an alveolar trill /r/, rather than the uvular trill [ʀ], and is identical to Arabic ر rāʾ and follows the conventions of old Hebrew.
- The kaf sofit with a dagesh (ךּ) is pronounced as such, ('ka') as in the rare example of the last word in Psalm 30.

=== Vowels ===
- Qāmaṣ gāḏôl/Qamac qadol is pronounced /ɔː/, as in Ashkenazi Hebrew and Tiberian Hebrew. The Yemenite pronunciation for Qamats gadol (קמץ גדול) and Qamats qatan (קמץ קטן) is identical (see infra.).
- There is no distinction between the vowels paṯaḥ/pataħ and səḡôl/segol all being pronounced /æ(ː)/, like the Arabic fatḥa (a feature also found in old Babylonian Hebrew, which used a single symbol for all three). A šəwâ nāʻ/šwa naʕ, however, is identical to a חטף פתח and חטף סגול.
- Final hê/hej with mappîq/mefiq has an aspirated sound, generally stronger sounding than the regular hê/hej. Aleph (אַלַף) with a dagesh, a rare occurrence, is pronounced with a glottal stop, e.g., the word וַיָּבִיאּוּ in Genesis 43:26. Conversely, some words in Hebrew which are written with the final hê ending (without the mappîq) are realized by a secondary glottal stop and so are abruptly cut short, as to hold one's breath.
- A semivocalic sound is heard before paṯaḥ gānûḇ/pataħ ganuv (furtive paṯaḥ coming between a long vowel and a final guttural): thus ruaħ (spirit) sounds like rúwwaḥ and siaħ (speech) sounds like síyyaḥ. (That is shared with other Mizrahi pronunciations, such as the Syrian.)

Yemenite pronunciation is not uniform, and Morag has distinguished five sub-dialects, the best known being probably Sana'ani, originally spoken by Jews in and around Sana'a. Roughly, the points of difference are as follows:

- In some dialects, ḥōlem/ħolam (long "o" in modern Hebrew) is pronounced /øː/, but in others, it is pronounced /eː/ like ṣêrệ/cerej. (The last pronunciation is shared with Lithuanian Jews.)
- Some dialects (e.g. Sharab) do not differentiate between bêṯ/bet with dāḡēš/dageš and without it. That occurs most of Mizrahi Hebrew.
- Sana'ani Hebrew primarily places stress on the penultimate syllable, as in Ashkenazi Hebrew.

==== Qamats Gadol and Qamats Qatan ====
Yemenite reading practices continue the orthographic conventions of the early grammarians, such as Abraham ibn Ezra and Aaron Ben-Asher. One basic rule of grammar states that every word with a long vowel sound, that is, one of either five vowel sounds whose mnemonics are "pītūḥe ḥöthom" (i.e. ḥiraq, šūraq, ṣeré, ḥölam and qamaṣ), whenever there is written beside one of these long vowel sounds a meteg (or what is also called a ga’ayah) and is denoted by a small vertical line below the word (e.g. under the ז in זָֽכְרוּ), it indicates that the vowel (in that case, qamaṣ) must be drawn out with a prolonged sound. For example, ōōōōōō, instead of ō, (e.g. zoː— kh^{ǝ} ru). In the Sephardic tradition, however, the practice is different altogether, and they will also alter the phonetic sound of the short vowel qamaṣ qattön whenever the vowel appears alongside a meteg (a small vertical line), reading it as the long vowel qamaṣ gadöl, giving to it the sound of "a", as in car, instead of "ōōōōō." Thus, for the verse in כָּל עַצְמוֹתַי תֹּאמַרְנָה (Psalm 35:10), the Sephardic Jews will pronounce the word כָּל as "kal" (e.g. kal ʕaṣmotai, etc.), instead of kol ʕaṣmotai as pronounced by both Yemenite and Ashkenazi Jewish communities.

The meteg, or ga’ayah, has actually two functions: (1) It extends the sound of the vowel; (2) It makes any šewa that is written immediately after the vowel a mobile šewa, meaning, the šewa itself becomes ə. For example: אוֹמְרים = ʔö m^{ǝ} rim, שׁוֹמְרים = šö m^{ǝ} rim, סִיסְרָא = sī s^{ǝ} ra, שׁוּבְךָ = šū v^{ǝ} kha, and טוּבְךָ = tū v^{ǝ} kha. Examples with meteg/ga’ayah: שָֽׁמְרָה = šoː m^{ǝ} ro, ּיֵֽרְדו = ye r^{ǝ} du.

The Qamats qatan is realized as the non-extended "o"-sound in the first qamats (qamaṣ) in the word, חָכְמָה ⇒ ḥokhma (wisdom).

The Yemenite qamaṣ ⟨ ָ ⟩ is represented in the transliterated texts by the diaphoneme /oː/. The vowel quality is the same, whether for a long or short vowel, but the long vowel sound is always prolonged.

==== Holam and sere ====
A distinct feature of Yemenite Hebrew is that there is some degree of approximation between the ḥōlam and the ṣêrệ. To the untrained ear, they may sound as the same phoneme, but Yemenite grammarians will point out the difference. The feature varies by dialect:

- In the standard, provincial pronunciation that is used by most Yemenite Jews, holam is pronounced as /øː/. For example, the word "shalom" (שָׁלוֹם), is pronounced sholøm.
- In some provincial dialects, in particular that of Aden, holam becomes a long e and is indeed indistinguishable from sere, and some early manuscripts sometimes confuse or interchange the symbols for the two sounds.

Some see the assimilation of the two vowels as a local variant within the wider Babylonian family, which the Yemenites happened to follow.

==== Strict application of Mobile Shewā ====
Rabbi Abraham Isaac Kook and Rabbi Jacob Saphir have praised the Yemenites in their correct pronunciation of Hebrew. They still read the biblical lections and liturgies according to what is prescribed for Hebrew grammar and are meticulous to pronounce the mobile šĕwā שוא נע in each of its changing forms. While most other communities also adhere to the rule of mobile šĕwā whenever two šĕwās are written one after the other, as in יִכְתְּבוּ, most have forgotten its other usages.

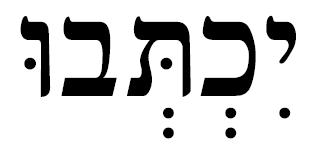
Mobile shĕwā

Aharon Ben-Asher, in his treatise on the proper usage of Hebrew vowels and trope symbols, writes on the šĕwā: "[It is] the servant of all the letters in the entire Scriptures, whether at the beginning of the word, or in the middle of the word, or at the end of the word; whether what is pronounced by the tongue or not pronounced, for it has many ways… However, if it is joined with one of four [guttural] letters, א ח ה ע, its manner [of pronunciation] will be like the manner of the vowel of the second letter in that word, such as: בְּֽהֹנוֹת ידיהם ורגליהם (Jud. 1:7) = b^{ö}honoth; מתי פתים תְּֽאֵהֲבוּ פתי (Prov. 1:22) = t^{e}’ehavu; עיניו לְֽחֵלְכָה יצפנו (Ps. 10:8) = l^{e}ḥeləkhah; שריה רְֽעֵלָיָה מרדכי (Ezra 2:2) = r^{e}ʻeloyoh."

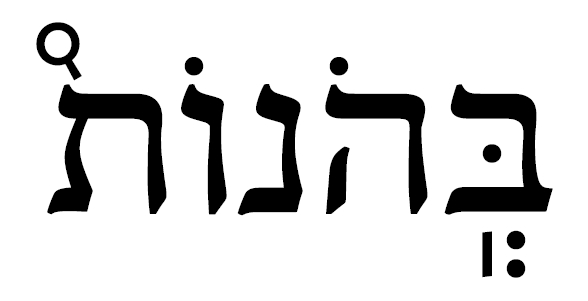
Mobile shewa (shĕwā-jiʻya)

On the mobile šĕwā and its usage amongst Yemenite Jews, Israeli grammarian Shelomo Morag wrote: "The pronunciation of the šĕwā mobile preceding א, ה, ח, ע, or ר in the Yemenite tradition is realized in accordance with the vowel following the guttural; quantitatively, however, this is an ultra-short vowel. For example, a word such as וְחוּט is pronounced w^{u}ḥuṭ. A šĕwā preceding a yōḏ is pronounced as an ultra-short ḥīreq: the word בְּיוֹם is pronounced b^{i}yōm. This is the way the šĕwā is known to have been pronounced in the Tiberian tradition."

Other examples of words of the mobile šĕwā in the same word taking the phonetic sound of the vowel assigned to the adjacent guttural letter or of a mobile šĕwā before the letter yod (י) taking the phonetic sound of the yod, can be seen in the following:

- (Gen. 48:21) וְהֵשִׁיב = w^{e}heshiv
- (Gen. 49:30) בַּמְּעָרָה = bam^{o}ʻoroh
- (Gen. 50:10) בְּעֵבֶר = b^{e}ʻevar
- (Exo. 7:27) וְאִם = w^{i}’im
- (Exo. 20:23) מִזְבְּחִי = mizb^{i}ḥī
- (Deut. 11:13) וְהָיָה = w^{o}hoyoh
- (Psalm 92:1–3)

מִזְמוֹר שִׁיר לְיוֹם הַשַּׁבָּת. טוֹב לְהֹדוֹת לַה' וּלְזַמֵּר לְשִׁמְךָ עֶלְיון. לְהַגִּיד בַּבֹּקֶר חַסְדֶּךָ וֶאֱמוּנָתְךָ בַּלֵּילוֹת

(vs. 1) l^{i}yöm – (vs. 2) l^{o}hödöth – (vs. 3) l^{a}haǧīdh

The above rule applies only to when one of the four guttural letters (אחהע), or a yod (י) or a resh (ר) follows the mobile šĕwā, but it does not apply to the other letters; then, the mobile šĕwā is always read as a short-sounding pataḥ.

== Distinctive pronunciations preserved ==
Geographically isolated for centuries, the Yemenite Jews constituted a peculiar phenomenon within Diaspora Jewry. In their isolation, they preserved specific traditions of both Hebrew and Aramaic. The traditions, transmitted from generation to generation through the teaching and reciting of the Bible, post-biblical Hebrew literature (primarily the Mishnah), the Aramaic Targums of the Bible, and the Babylonian Talmud, are still alive. They are manifest in the traditional manner of reading Hebrew that is practised by most members of the community. The Yemenite reading traditions of the Bible are now based on the Tiberian text and vocalization, as proofread by the masorete, Aaron ben Asher, with the one exception that the vowel sǝġūl is pronounced as a pataḥ, since the sǝġūl did not exist in the Babylonian orthographic tradition to which the Jews of Yemen had previously been accustomed. In what concerns Biblical orthography, with the one exception of the sǝgūl, the Yemenite Jewish community does not differ from any other Jewish community.

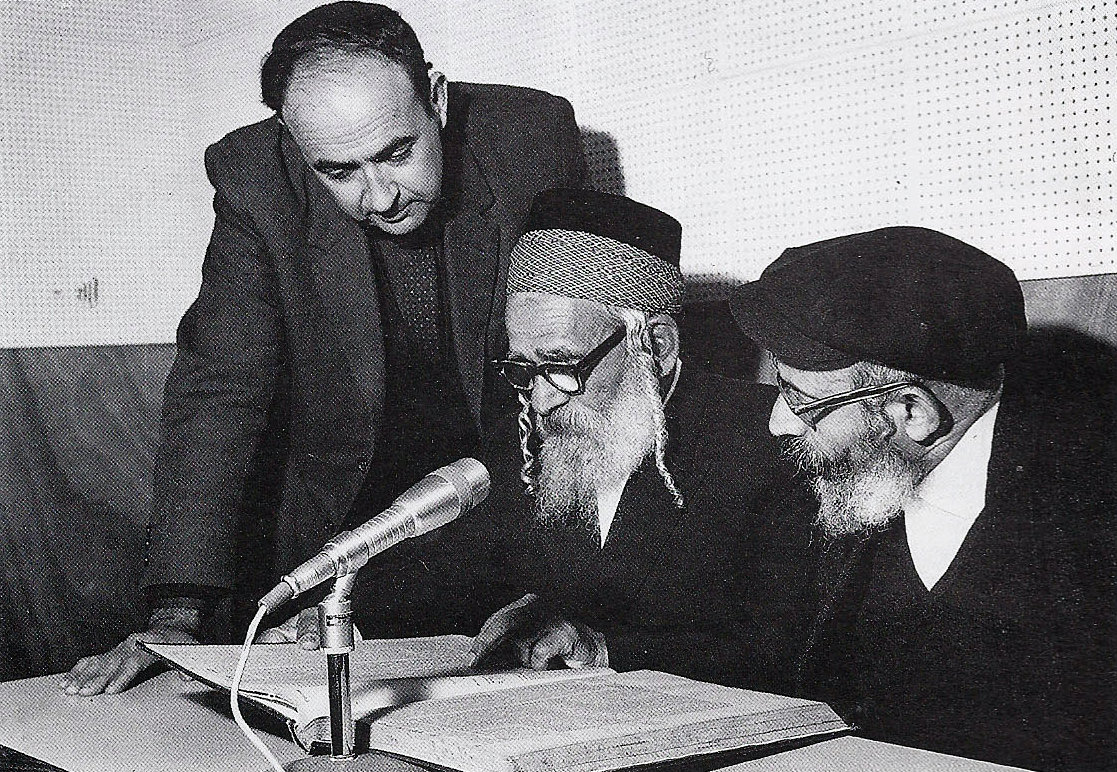
Shelomo Morag (standing) recording Yemenite rabbis, Yosef Saleh and Yosef Amar Halevi (sitting)

Although the vast majority of post-Biblical Hebrew and Aramaic words are pronounced the same way or nearly the same way by all of Israel's diverse ethnic groups, including the Jews of Yemen, there are still other words whose phonemic system differs greatly from the way it is used in Modern Hebrew, the sense here being the tradition of vocalization or diction of selective Hebrew words found in the Mishnah and Midrashic literature, or of Aramaic words found in the Talmud, and which tradition has been meticulously preserved by the Jews of Yemen. Two of the more recognized Yemenite pronunciations are for the words רבי and גברא, the first pronounced as Ribbi, instead of Rabbi (as in Rabbi Meir), and the second pronounced guvra, instead of gavra. In the first case, archaeologist Benjamin Mazar was the first to discover its linguistic usage in the funerary epigrams of the 3rd and 4th-century CE, during excavations at the catacombs in Beit She'arim. Nahman Avigad, speaking of the same, wrote: "Of special interest is the title Rabbi and its Greek transliteration (Greek: ΡΑΒΙ). In the inscriptions of Beth She'arim found in the former seasons ריבי and ביריבי are usual, and only once do we find רבי, which has been regarded as a defective form of ריבי, for in Greek we generally find the form (Greek: ΡΙΒΒΙ). The transliteration (Greek: ΡΑΒΙ) found here shows that the title was pronounced in Palestine in different ways, sometimes Rabbi (ΡΑΒΒΙ, ΡΑΒΙ), sometimes Ribbi (ΡΙΒΒΙ, ΡΙΒΙ) and occasionally even Rebbi (ΒΗΡΕΒΙ)." In the latter case, the Jerusalem Talmud occasionally brings down the word גברא in plene scriptum, גוברייא (pl. for גברא), showing that its pronunciation was the same as that in use by the Yemenites. Some have raised the proposition that the Yemenite linguistic tradition dates back to the Amoraim.

R. Yehudai Gaon, in his Halakhot Pesukot (Hil. Berakhot), uses yod as the mater lectionis to show the vowel hiriq, after the qoph (ק) in Qiryat Shema (Hebrew: קִירְיַת שְׁמַע). The editor of the critical edition, A. Israel, who places its composition in Babylonia, notes that "linguists would take an interest" in Yehudai Gaon's variant spellings of words, where especially the matres lectionis is used in place of vowels, "represented either by a plene alef (א), waw (ו), and yod (י)." The use of the matres lectionis in place of the vowel hiriq in the construct case of the words קִרְיַת שְׁמַע ("recital of Shemaʻ" = קירית שמע) reflects apparently the Babylonian tradition of pronunciation, and, today, the same tradition is mirrored in the Yemenite pronunciation of Qiryat shemaʻ.

The following diagrams show a few of the more conspicuous differences in the Yemenite tradition of vocalization and which Israeli linguist, Shelomo Morag, believes reflects an ancient form of vocalizing the texts and was once known and used by all Hebrew-speakers.

Yemenite		Modern		Yemenite		Modern	
אַוֵּיר	ʾawwēr	אַוִּיר	ʾavvīr	דְּבָק	dŏḇog	דֶּבֶק	deḇeq
אֵי אִפְשָׁר	ʾēy ʾīfšor	אִי אֶפְשָׁר	ʾīy ʾefšār	הַפַּלָּגָה	happalloġo	הַפְּלָגָה	happǝlāgā
אֵינוּ	ʾēnū	אֵינוֹ	ʾēnō	דְּכַתִיב	dăḵaṯīḇ	דִּכְתִיב	dīḵǝṯīḇ
אֶסְתְּנַס	ʾestənas	אִסְתְּנִיס	ʾistənīs	הַאיְדַּנָא	haʾydanoʾ	הַאִידְּנָא	haʾīydǝnāʾ
אִתְאֲמַר	ʾīṯʾămar	אִיתְּמַר	ʾītəmar	הוּרְדּוּס	Hūrŭdūs	הוֹרְדוֹס	Hōrǝdōs
בֵּיעוּר חָמֵץ	bēyʿūr ḥomēṣ	בִּיעוּר חָמֵץ	bīyʿūr ḥāmēṣ	הִלְכּוֹת	hīlkōṯ	הִלְכוֹת	hīlḵōṯ
בָּצֵל	boṣēl	בָּצָל	bāṣāl	הִעְמִיד	hīʿĭmīḏ	הֶעֱמִיד	heʿĕmīḏ
בִּרְיָה	bīryo	בְּרִיָּה	bərīyyā	וִהְוִי	wīhĭwīy	וֶהֱוֵי	vehĕvēy
בָּתֵּי כְּנָסִיּוֹת	botē kŏnosīyyōṯ	בָּתֵּי כְּנֵסִיּוֹת	bātē kənēsīyyōṯ	וְכַתִיב	wăḵaṯīḇ	וּכְתִיב	ūḵǝṯīḇ
גֻּבְרָא	ǧuḇroʾ	גַּבְרָא	gaḇrāʾ	זְכוֹכִית	zŏḵōḵīṯ	זְכוּכִית	zəḵūḵīṯ
גַּט	ǧaṭ	גֵּט	gēṭ	זָכִיּוֹת	zoḵīyyōṯ	זָכֻיּוֹת	zāḵuyyōṯ
גְּייָס	ǧĭyyos	גַּייִס	gayyīs	זְפָק	zŏfog	זֶפֶק	zefeq
גִּיעְגּוּעִין	ǧīʿǧūʿīn	גַּעְגּוּעִים	gaʿgūʿīm	חוֹמַשׁ	ḥōmaš	חוּמַּשׁ	ḥūmmaš
גְּנָאי	ǧŏnoʾy	גְּנַאי	gǝnaʾy	חֲלָזוֹן	ḥălozōn	חִלָּזוֹן	ḥīllāzōn
דְּבֵּילָה	dĕbēlo	דְּבֵילָה	dǝḇēlā	חַשְׁמוּנַּאי	ḥašmūnnaʾy	חַשְׁמוֹנָאי	ḥašmōnāʾy

Notes on transliteration: In the Yemenite Jewish tradition, the vowel qamaṣ ⟨ ָ ⟩, represents /oː/. The Hebrew character Tau (Hebrew: ת), without a dot of accentuation, represents /θ/. The Hebrew character Gimal (Hebrew: גּ), with a dot of accentuation, represents /dʒ/. The Hebrew word גנאי (in the above middle column, and meaning 'a thing detestable'), is written in Yemenite Jewish tradition with a vowel qamaṣ beneath the Hebrew: נ, but since it is followed by the letters אי it represents /ɔɪ/. The vowel ḥolam in the Yemenite dialect is transcribed here with ⟨o⟩, and represents a front rounded vowel. Another peculiarity with the Yemenite dialect is that the vast majority of Yemenite Jews (excluding the Jews of Sharab in Yemen) will replace /q/, used here in transliteration of texts, with the phonetic sound of [ɡ].

Yemenite		Modern		Yemenite		Modern	
חֲתִיכָּה	ḥăṯīko	חֲתִיכָה	ḥăṯīḵā	לוֹלָב	lōloḇ	לוּלָב	lūlāḇ
טְלִית	ṭĭlīṯ	טַלִּית	ṭallīṯ	לֵישַׁב	lēšaḇ	לֵישֵׁב	lēšēḇ
מַדְרֵס	maḏrēs	מִדְרָס	mīḏrās	לִמּוֹל	līmmōl	לָמוּל	lāmūl
יְהֶא	yĕheʾ	יְהֵא	yǝhēʾ	לְמַחוֹת	lămaḥōṯ	לִמְחוֹת	līməḥōṯ
יְכוּלִים	yŭḵūlīm	יְכוֹלִים	yǝḵōlīm	לְמַעַט	lămaʿaṭ	לְמַעֵט	ləmaʿēṭ
יְרוּשְׁלְמִי	yŭrūšlĭmī	יְרוּשַׁלְמִי	yǝrūšalmī	לְפִיכָּךְ	lĭfīkoḵ	לְפִיכָךְ	ləfīḵāḵ
יָרָק	yorog	יֶרֶק	yereq	לְקָרַב / לְרַחַק	lŏgoraḇ / lăraḥag	לְקָרֵב / לְרַחֵק	ləqārēḇ / ləraḥēq
כּוּמָר	kūmor	כּוֹמֶר	kōmer	לִשְׁאַל	līšʾal	לִשְׁאֹל	līšʾōl
כּוֹתָל	kōṯol	כּוֹתֶל	kōṯel	לְשַׁקַּר	lăšaggar	לְשַׁקֵּר	ləšaqqēr
כִּי הַאיֵ גְּוַנָא	kī haʾyē ǧăwanoʾ	כִּי הַאי גַּוְנָא	kī haʾy gavnāʾ	לְתַכֶּן	lăṯakan	לְתַקֵּן	ləṯaqēn
יֵיתֵי וִיפַסַּח	yēyṯēy wīyfassaḥ	יֵיתֵי וְיִפְסַח	yēyṯēy vǝyīfǝsaḥ	מְבוּקְשׁוֹ	mŭḇūgŏšō	מְבוּקָּשׁוֹ	məḇūqqāšō
כָּרֵיתוֹת	korēṯoṯ	כְּרִיתוּת	kǝrīṯūṯ	אִכְּפַת	’īkfaṯ	אִכְפַּת	’īḵpaṯ
כִּשְׁהוּא / כִּשְׁהֶן	kīšhūʾ / kīšhan	כְּשֶׁהוּא / כְּשֶׁהֶן	kǝšehūʾ / kǝšehen	מִיָּמִים	mīyyomīm	מִיּוֹמַיִם	mīyyōmayīm
לְאַפַּוְקֵי	lăʾapawgēy	לְאַפּוּקֵי	lǝʾapūqēy	מְזָמְנִין	mŏzomĭnīn	מְזַמְּנִין	məzammənīn
לְבַטַּל	lăḇaṭṭal	לְבַטֵּל	lǝḇattēl	מִחֲזִי	mīḥăzīy	מִיחְזֵי	mīyḥəzēy
לִגְמַרֵי	līġmarēy	לִגַמְרֵי	līgamǝrēy	מְחָנְפִים	mŏḥonĭfīm	מַחֲנִיפִים	maḥănīfīm
לִידָה	līḏo	לֵידָה	lēḏā	מִיּוֹשֵׁב	mīyyōšēḇ	מְיוּשָּׁב	məyūššāḇ

In the Yemenite tradition, the plural endings on the words זָכִיּוֹת (merits), מַלְכִיּוֹת (kingdoms), גָּלִיּוֹת (exiles), טעִיּוֹת (errors), טרפִיּוֹת (defective animals) and עֵדִיּוֹת (testimonies), all differ from the way they are vocalized in Modern Hebrew. In Modern Hebrew, these words are marked with a shuraq, as follows: זָכֻיּוֹת – מַלְכֻיּוֹת – גָּלֻיּוֹת – טעֻיּוֹת – טרפֻיּוֹת – עֵדֻיּוֹת. Although the word Hebrew: מַלְכֻיוֹת (kingdoms) in Daniel 8:22 is vocalized malkhuyoth, as it is in Modern Hebrew, Shelomo Morag thinks that the Yemenite tradition reflects a phonological phenomenon known as dissimilation, whereby similar consonants or vowels in a word become less similar. Others explain the discrepancy as being in accordance with a general rule of practice, prevalent in the 2nd century CE, where the Hebrew in rabbinic literature was distinguished from that of Biblical Hebrew, and put into an entire class and category of its own, with its own rules of vocalization (see infra).

The Hebrew noun חֲתִיכָּה (ḥăṯīkkah), in the upper left column, is a word meaning "slice/piece" (in the absolute state), or חֲתִיכַּת בשר ("piece of meat") in the construct state. The noun is of the same metre as קְלִיפָּה (qǝlipah), a word meaning "peel," or the "rind" of a fruit. Both the kaph and pe in these nouns are with a dagesh. However, the same roots applied to different meters, serving as gerunds, as in "slicing/cutting" [meat] and "peeling" [an apple], the words would respectively be חֲתִיכָה (ḥăṯīḫah) and קליפָה (qǝlīfah), without a dagesh in the Hebrew characters Kaph and Pe (i.e. rafe letters), such as when the verb is used with the preposition "after": e.g. "after peeling the apple" = אחרי קליפת התפוח, or "after cutting the meat" = אחרי חתיכת הבשר.

Yemenite		Modern		Yemenite		Modern	
פוּשָׁרין	fūšorīn	פּוֹשְׁרִין	pōšǝrīn	מְתַלְּעִין	măṯallĭʿīn	מַתְלִיעִים	maṯlīʿīm
מֵיעוּט	mēyʿūṭ	מִיעוּט	mīyʿūṭ	מִתְּקָן	mittŏgon	מְתוּקָּן	mǝṯūqqān
וְאִילַּךְ	wĭʾīllaḵ	וְאֵילַךְ	vǝʾēlaḵ	נֶאֱמָר	naʾămor	נֶאֱמַר	neʾĕmar
מְכִילְּתָא	mĭḵīllŏṯoʾ	מְכִילְתָּא	mǝḵīlǝtāʾ	נִהְנָה, נִהְנִין	nīhŏno, nīhĭnīn	נֶהֱנָה, נֶהֱנִין	nehĕnā, nehĕnīyn
מִלְוָה	mīlwo	מִלְוֶה	mīlve	נוֹיִ	nōyī	נוֹי	nōy
מְלָחֵם בַּרְזֶל	mŏloḥēm barzal	מַלְחֵם בַּרְזֶל	malḥēm barzel	נוּלָּד	nūlloḏ	נוֹלַד	nōlad
הָרִשְׁעָה	horīšʿo	הָרְשָׁעָה	hārǝšāʿā	נוּצָּר	nūṣṣor	נוֹצַר	nōṣar
מְנוּדָּה	mŭnūdo	מְנוּדֶה	mǝnūde	נִכְנָס	nīḵnos	נִכְנַס	nīḵnas
מֵעוֹמֵד	mēʿōmēḏ	מְעוּמָּד	mǝʿūmmāḏ	נָמוֹךְ	nomōḵ	נָמוּךְ	nāmūḵ
מַעְרָבִית	maʿroḇīṯ	מַעֲרָבִית	maʿărāḇīṯ	נִמּוֹס	nīmmōs	נִימוּס	nīmmūs
מַעְשַׂר	maʿsar	מַעֲשֵׂר	maʿăsēr	נְפָט	nŏfoṭ	נֵפְט	nēfǝṭ
מִקְוָה	mīgwo	מִקְוֶה	mīqve	נִצְטַעַר	nīṣăṭaʿar	נִצְטַעֵר	nīṣṭaʿēr
מַקְפִיד	magfīḏ	מַקְפִּיד	maqpīḏ	נִקְרַאַת	nīgraʾaṯ	נִקְרֵאת	nīqrēṯ
מְקַרֶּא	măgarraʾ	מַקְרִיא	maqrīyʾ	נִתְגַּיַיר	nīṯǧayayr	נִתְגַּיֵּיר	nīṯgayyēyr
מְרוֹסָס	mŏrōsos	מְרֻסָּס	mǝrussās	סְבַרָא	săvaroʾ	סְבָרָא	sǝvārāʾ
מַרְחֵץ	marḥēṣ	מֶרְחָץ	merḥāṣ	סַגֵי	saġēy	סַגִי	sagīy
מְרַחְשְׁוָן	măraḥšŏwon	מַרְחֶשְׁוָן	marḥešvān	סוֹמֶא	sōmaʾ	סוּמָא	sūmāʾ
מִשּׁוֹם	mīššom	מִשּׁוּם	mīššūm	סוּרַג	sūraġ	סוֹרֶג	sōreg
מִשְׁכּוֹן	mīškōn	מַשְׁכּוֹן	maškōn	סְעוֹדָה	sŏʿoḏo	סְעוּדָה	sǝʿūdā
מְשַׁכַּחַת	măšakaḥaṯ	מַשְׁכַּחַת	maškaḥaṯ	סְקֵילָה	sĕgēlo	סְקִילָה	sǝqīlā

In the Talmud (Ḥullin 137b; Avodah Zarah 58b), the Sages of Israel had a practice to read words derived from the Scriptures in their own given way, while the same words derived from the Talmud or in other exegetical literature (known as the Midrash) in a different way: "When Isse the son of Hinei went up [there], he found Rabbi Yoḥanan teaching [a certain Mishnah] to the creations, saying, raḥelim (i.e. רחלים = the Hebrew word for "ewes"), etc. He said to him, 'Teach it [by its Mishnaic name = רחלות], raḥeloth!' He replied, '[What I say is] as it is written [in the Scriptures]: Ewes (raḥelim), two-hundred.' (Gen. 32:15) He answered him, 'The language of the Torah is by itself, and the language employed by the Sages is by itself!'" (לשון תורה לעצמה, לשון חכמים לעצמן).

This passage from the Talmud is often quoted by grammarians of Yemenite origin to explain certain "discrepancies" found in vocalization of words where a comparable source can be found in the Hebrew Bible, such as the Yemenite tradition in rabbinic literature to say Hebrew: מַעְבִּיר (maʻbīr), rather than Hebrew: מַעֲבִיר (maʻăvīr) – although the latter rendering appears in Scripture (Deuteronomy 18:10), or to say Hebrew: זִיעָה (zīʻah), with ḥīraq, rather than, Hebrew: זֵיעָה (zeʻah), with ṣerê, although it too appears in Scripture (Genesis 3:19), or to say Hebrew: ברכת המזון (birkhath ha-mazon) (= kaph rafe), rather than as the word "blessing" in the construct state which appears in the Scriptures (Genesis 28:4, et al.), e.g. birkath Avraham (ברכת אברהם), with kaph dagesh. Others, however, say that these anomalies reflect a tradition that antedates the Tiberian Masoretic texts.

Along these same lines, the Masoretic Text of the Hebrew Bible renders the words (Hebrew: יַבְנֶה), in II Chronicles 26:6, and (Hebrew: לוֹד), in Nehemiah 7:37; 11:35, as yävnɛ and lōð, respectively. However, in their demotic-forms, the Yemenites will pronounce these words as (Hebrew: יָבְנֵה) and (Hebrew: לוּדּ) = yovnei and lūd, respectively. The use of the phoneme "ṣerê", represented by the two dots "◌ֵ", instead of "pataḥ-səġūl" (ֶ) for the word "Yavneh" may have been influenced by the Palestinian dialect spoken in the Land of Israel in the 1st-century CE.

Yemenite		Modern		Yemenite		Modern	
עוּנְשִׁין	ʿūnšīn	עוֹנָשִׁים	ʿōnašīm	צִפּוֹרַיִם	ṣīpōrayīm	צִפּוֹרִים	ṣīpōrīm
עֲזֶרֶת	ʿăzaraṯ	עֶזְרַת	ʿezraṯ	קְבָע	gŏvoʿ	קֶבַע	qevaʿ
עַל שׁוֹם	ʿal šōm	עַל שׁוּם	ʿal šūm	קוּנְטְרִס	gūnṭĭrīs	קוּנְטְרֵס	qūnṭǝrēs
עִנְוְתָנוּתוֹ	ʿīnwŏṯonūṯo	עַנְוְתָנוּתוֹ	ʿanvǝṯanūṯō	קָטְנִית, קָטְנָיוֹת	goṭnīṯ / goṭnoyōṯ	קִטְנִית, קִטְנִיּוֹת	qīṭnīṯ / qīṭnīyyōt
עֲקִידַת	ʿăgīḏaṯ	עֲקֵידַת	ʿăqēḏaṯ	קִיבַּל	gībal	קִיבֵּל	qībēl
עַרָּבִים	ʿarrovīm	עֲרֵבִים	ʿărēvīm	קֵיסַם	gēsam	קִיסָם	qīsam
עַרְבִּית	ʿarbīṯ	עַרְבִית	ʿarvīṯ	קֶלֶף	galaf	קְלָף	qǝlaf
פַזְמוּן	fazmūn	פִּזְמוֹן	pīzmōn	קְפִידָה	gĭfīḏo	קְפֵידָה	qǝfēda
פָּחוּת	poḥūṯ	פָּחוֹת	pāḥōṯ	קֻרְדּוֹם	gurdōm	קַרְדּוֹם	qardōm
פַּטְרָיוֹת	paṭroyōṯ	פִּטְרִיּוֹת	pīṭrīyyōṯ	קִרְיַת שְׁמַע	gīryaṯ šămaʿ	קְרִיַּת שמע	qǝrīyyat šǝmaʿ
פָסוּק	fosūg	פָּסוּק	pāsūq	קָרְקֳבָּן	gorgŏbon	קוּרְקְבָן	qūrqǝḇān
פִּרְיָה וְרִבְיָה	pīryo wĭrīvyo	פְּרִיָּה וּרְבִיָּה	pǝrīyyā urǝvīyyā	קַרְקָע	gergoʿ	קַרְקַע	qarqaʿ
פִּרְצוּף	pīrṣūf	פַּרְצוּף	parṣūf	חַלְפְּתָא	Ḥalpŏṯoʾ	חֲלַפְתָּא	Ḥălaftāʾ
פֵּרַק	pērag	פֶּרֶק	pereq	רִבִּי	Rībīy	רַבִּי	Rabī
פָרָשָׁה	forošo	פָּרָשָׁה	pārāšā	שָׁטוּת	shoṭūṯ	שְׁטוּת	shǝṭūṯ
פִּתְקִין	pīṯgīn	פְּתָקִים	pǝtaqīm	רוֹמֵי	Rōmēy	רוֹמִי	Rōmīy
צְבָע	ṣŏvoʿ	צֶבַע	ṣevaʿ	רְמָז	rŏmoz	רֶמֶז	remez
צַדּוּקִים	ṣadūgīm	צְדוֹקִים	ṣǝdōqīm	שְׁאֵין	šĕʾēyn	שֶׁאֵין	šeʾēyn

In Yemenite tradition, many words in both Biblical and Mishnaic Hebrew which are written with the final hê ending (without the mappîq) are realized by a secondary glottal stop, meaning, they are abruptly cut short, as when one holds his breath. Shelomo Morag who treats upon this peculiarity in the Yemenite tradition of vocalization brings down two examples from the Book of Isaiah, although by no means exclusive, where he shows the transliteration for the words תִּפָּדֶה in Isaiah 1:27 and וְנֵלְכָה in Isaiah 2:5, and both of which represent /ʔ/, as in tippoːdä(ʔ) and wǝnel^{ă}χoː(ʔ) respectively. The word פָרָשָׁה (Bible Codex) in the upper-middle column is pronounced in the same way, e.g. foːroːʃoːʔ.

Yemenite		Modern		Yemenite		Modern	
שְׁאִם	šĭʾīm	שֶׁאִם	šeʾīm	שְׂרַגָּא	săraǧoʾ	שְׁרָגָא	šǝragaʾ
שְׁבוֹת	šŏvoṯ	שְׁבוּת	šǝvūt	שִׁרְטוּט	šīrṭūṭ	שִׂרְטוּט	sīrṭūṭ
שְׁבָח	šŏvoḥ	שֶׁבַח	ševaḥ	שְׁתָיָה (אבן שתיה)	šŏṯoyo	שְׁתִיָּה (אבן שתיה)	šǝtīyya
שַׁחְרִית	šaḥrīṯ	שַׁחֲרִית	šaḥărīt	תְּחָיַת	tŏḥoyeṯ	תְּחִיַת	tǝḥīyaṯ
שַׁיֵיךְ	šayēḵ	שַׁיָּךְ	šayyaḵ	תְּלָאי	tŏloʾy	תְּלַאי	tǝlaʾy
שִׁינָה	šīyno	שֵׁינָה	šēna	תִּלְמוֹד לוֹמַר	tīlmōḏ lōmar	תַּלְמוּד לוֹמַר	talmūd lōmar
שֵׁיעוּר	šēʿūr	שִׁיעוּר	šīʿūr	תְּנוֹ רַבָּנַן	tŏnō rabonan	תָּנוּ רַבָּנָן	tanū rabanan
שֶׁיַּעְרִיב	šayyaʿrīv	שֶׁיַּעֲרִיב	šeyaʿărīv	תֻּרְדְּיוֹן	Turḏĭyōn	תְּרַדְיוֹן	Təraḏyōn
שְׁיַרֵי	šăyarēy	שִׁירֵי	šīrēy	תֻּרְנְגוֹל	turnŏġōl	תַּרְנְגוֹל	tarnǝgōl
שָׁעַת	šoʿeṯ	שְׁעַת	šǝʿat	תֻּשְׁבְּחוֹת	tušbŏḥōṯ	תִּשְׁבְּחוֹת	tišbǝḥōt
שְׁפוּד	šŭfūḏ	שִׁפּוּד	šipūd	תִּשְׁרִי	tīšrīy	תִּשְׁרֵי	tīšrēy

Excursus: The preposition (Hebrew: שֶׁלְּ... שֶׁלַּ... שֶׁלִּ... שֶׁלָּ ..., lit. 'of') is unique in the Yemenite Jewish tradition. The Hebrew preposition is always written with the noun, joined as one word, and the lamed is always accentuated with a dagesh. For example, if the noun Hebrew: מלך, lit. 'king', would normally have been written with the definite article Hebrew: ה־, lit. 'the', as in Hebrew: הַמֶּלֶךְ, lit. 'the king', and the noun was to show possession, as in the sentence: "the palace of the king," the definite article "the" (Hebrew: ה) is dropped, but the same vowel pataḥ of the definite article is carried over to the lamed, as in שֶׁלַּמֶּלֶךְ, instead of של המלך. The vowel on the lamed will sometimes differ, depending on what noun comes after the preposition. For example, the definite article "the" in Hebrew nouns which begin with aleph or resh and sometimes ayin, such as in הָאָדָם and in הָרִאשׁוֹן, or in הָעוֹלָם, is written with the vowel qamaṣ – in which case, the vowel qamaṣ is carried over to the lamed, as in שֶׁלָּאָדָם and in שֶׁלָּרִאשׁוֹן and in שֶׁלָּעוֹלָם. Another general rule is that whenever a possessive noun is written without the definite article "the", as in the words, "a king's sceptre," or "the sceptre of a king" (Heb. מלך), the lamed in the preposition is written with the vowel shǝwa (i.e. mobile shǝwa), as in שרביט שֶׁלְּמֶּלֶךְ, and as in, "if it belongs to Israel" ⇒ אם הוא שֶׁלְּיִשְׂרַאֵל. Whenever the noun begins with a shǝwa, as in the proper noun Solomon (Heb. שְׁלֹמֹה) and one wanted to show possession, the lamed in the preposition is written with a ḥiraq, as in (Song of Solomon 3:7): מטתו שֶׁלִּשְׁלֹמֹה ⇒ "Solomon's bed", or as in עונשם שֶׁלִּרְשָׁעִים ⇒ "the punishment of the wicked", or in חבילה שֶׁלִּתְרוּמָה ⇒ "a bundle of heave-offering."

Another rule of practice in Hebrew grammar is that two shǝwas חְ are never written one after the other at the beginning of any word; neither can two ḥaṭaf pataḥs חֲ or two ḥaṭaf sǝġūls חֱ be written at the beginning of a word one after the other. The practical implication arising from this rule is that when there is a noun beginning with a ḥaṭaf pataḥ, as in the word, חֲבִרְתָּהּ ⇒ "her companion", and one wishes to add thereto the preposition "to" – as in, "to her companion" ⇒ לַחֲבִרְתָּהּ, the lamed is written with the vowel pataḥ, instead of a shǝwa (i.e. a mobile shǝwa), seeing that the shǝwa at the beginning of a word and the ḥaṭaf pataḥ, as well as the ḥaṭaf sǝġūl, are all actually one and the same vowel (in the Babylonian tradition), and it is as though he had written two shǝwas one after the other. Likewise, in the possessive case, "belonging to her companion" ⇒ שֶׁלַּחֲבִרְתָּהּ, the lamed in the preposition של is written with the vowel pataḥ.

== Hebrew vernacular ==
The Leiden MS. of the Jerusalem Talmud is important in that it preserves some earlier variants to textual readings of that Talmud, such as in Tractate Pesaḥim 10:3 (70a), which brings down the old Palestinian-Hebrew word for charoseth (the sweet relish eaten at Passover), viz. dūkeh (Hebrew: דוכה), instead of rūbeh/rabah (Hebrew: רובה), saying with a play on words: "The members of Isse's household would say in the name of Isse: Why is it called dūkeh? It is because she pounds [the spiced ingredients] with him." The Hebrew word for "pound" is dakh (Hebrew: דך), which rules out the spelling of " rabah " (Hebrew: רבה), as found in the printed editions. Today, the Jews of Yemen, in their vernacular of Hebrew, still call the charoseth by the name dūkeh.

Other quintessential Hebrew words which have been preserved by the Jews of Yemen is their manner of calling a receipt of purchase by the name, roʔoːyoː (Hebrew: רְאָיָה), rather than the word "qabbalah" that is now used in Modern Hebrew. The weekly biblical lection read on Sabbath days is called by the name seder (Hebrew: סדר), since the word parashah (Hebrew: פרשה) has a completely different meaning, denoting a Bible Codex containing the first Five Books of Moses (plural: codices = פרשיות).

Charity; alms (Hebrew: מִצְוָה, miṣwoː), so-called in Yemenite Jewish parlance, was usually in the form of bread, collected in baskets each Friday before the Sabbath by those appointed over this task for distribution among the needy, without them being brought to shame. The same word is often used throughout the Jerusalem Talmud, as well as in Midrashic literature, to signify what is given out to the poor and needy. Today, in Modern Hebrew, the word is seldom used to imply charity, replaced now by the word, ts’dakah (Heb. צְדָקָה). In contrast, the word צדקה amongst Jews in Sana’a was a tax levied upon Jewish householders, particularly those whose professions were butchers, and which tax consisted of hides and suet from butchered animals, and which things were sold on a daily basis by the Treasurer, and the money accruing from the sale committed to the public fund for the Jewish poor of the city, which money was distributed to the city's poor twice a year; once on Passover, and once on Sukkot. The fund itself was known by the name toːḏer (Hebrew: תָּדֵיר), lit. "the constant [revenues]."

Although Jews in Yemen widely made-use of the South-Arabic word mukhwāṭ (Arabic: المُخْوَاط) for the "metal pointer" (stylus) used in pointing at the letters of sacred writ, they also knew the old Hebrew word for the same, which they called makhtev (Hebrew: מַכְתֵּב). The following story is related about this instrument in Midrash Rabba: "Rabban [Shimon] Gamliel says: ‘Five-hundred schools were in Beter, while the smallest of them wasn’t less than three-hundred children. They used to say, ‘If the enemy should ever come upon us, with these metal pointers (Hebrew: מַכְתֵּבִין) we’ll go out against them and stab them!’..."

In other peculiar words of interest, they made use of the word, shilṭön (Hebrew: שִׁלְטוֹן), for "governor" or "king," instead of "government," the latter word now being the more common usage in Modern Hebrew; kothev (Hebrew: כּוֹתֵב), for "scrivener", or copyist of religious texts, instead of the word "sofer" (scribe); ṣibbūr (Hebrew: צִבּוּר), for "a quorum of at least ten adult males," a word used in Yemen instead of the Modern Hebrew word, minyan; ḥefeṣ (Hebrew: חֵפֶץ), a noun meaning "desirable thing," was used by them to describe any "book" (especially one of a prophylactic nature), although now in Modern Hebrew it means "object"; fiqfūq (Hebrew: פִקְפוּק) had the connotation of "shock," "violent agitation," or "shaking-up," although today, in Modern Hebrew, it has the meaning of "doubt" or "skepticism"; the word, harpathqe (Hebrew: הַרְפַּתְקֵי), was used to describe "great hardships," although in Modern Hebrew the word has come to mean "adventures." The word fazmūn (Hebrew: פַזְמוּן), any happy liturgical poem, such as those sung on Simhat Torah, differs from today's Modern Hebrew word, pizmon (Hebrew: פִּזְמוֹן), meaning, a "chorus" to a song. Another peculiar aspect of Yemenite Hebrew is what concerns denominative verbs. One of the nouns used for bread (made of wheat) is himmuṣ (Hebrew: הִמּוּץ), derived from the blessing that is said whenever breaking bread, המוציא [לחם מן הארץ] = He that brings forth [bread from the earth]. Whenever they wanted to say its imperative form, "break bread!", they made use of the denominative verb hammeṣ! (Hebrew: הַמֵּץ). Similarly, the noun for the Third Sabbath meal was qiyyūm (Hebrew: קְיּוּם), literally meaning "observance," in which they made use of the denominative verb, tǝqayyem (Hebrew: תְּקַיֵּם מענא) = Will you eat with us (the Third Sabbath meal)?, or, נְקַיֵּם = Let us eat (the Third Sabbath meal), or, qiyam (Hebrew: קִיַּם) = He ate (the Third Sabbath meal).

== See also ==
- Jewish customs of etiquette
- Yemenite Jewish poetry

== Bibliography ==
- Morag, Shelomo (2001). The Traditions of Hebrew and Aramaic of the Jews of Yemen (article: Notes on the Vowel System of Babylonian Aramaic as Preserved in the Yemenite Tradition), ed. Yosef Tobi. Tel-Aviv: Afikim. ISBN 965-7247-00-4.
- Morag, Shelomo (1974). "On the Historical Validity of the Vocalization of the Hebrew Bible". Journal of the American Oriental Society. 94 (3): 307–315. doi:10.2307/600065. JSTOR 600065.
- Isaac, Ephraim; Tobi, Yosef [in Hebrew] (1999). Judaeo-Yemenite Studies - Proceedings of the Second International Congress. Princeton University: Institute of Semitic Studies.
- Goitein, Shelomo Dov (1983). Ben-Sasson, Menahem (ed.). The Yemenites – History, Communal Organization, Spiritual Life (Selected Studies). Jerusalem: Yad Izhak Ben-Zvi. ISBN 965-235-011-7.
- Ratzaby, Yehuda [in Hebrew] (1978). Ōsar Leshon Haqqōdesh Shellivnē Temān [Dictionary of the Hebrew Language used by Yemenite Jews] (in Hebrew). Tel-Aviv.
- Gluska, Isaac; Kessar, Tsemah (1992). Shivtiel Book – Studies in the Hebrew Language and in the Linguistic Traditions of the Jewish Communities. Tel-Aviv. (Cited in article by Yehuda Ratzaby who quotes from Kitāb al-Ānwār, ed. Leon Nemoy)
- Ben Uzziel, Yonathan (1949). The Targum of Isaiah – with supralinear punctuation (ed. J.F. Stenning). Oxford.
- Amar Halevi, Yosef [in Hebrew] (1980). Talmud Bavli Menuqad. Vol. 1–20. Jerusalem.
- Yitzhak Halevi, Shalom (1960). Siddur Tefillat Kol Pe (in Hebrew). Jerusalem.
- Yitzhak Halevi, Avner (1993). Divrei Shalom Ḥakhamim (Memorial book in honor of Rabbi Shalom Yitzhak Halevi). Jerusalem. (Hebrew)
- Qafih, Yosef (1989). Collected Papers. Vol. 2. Jerusalem. pp. 943–946. (Hebrew)
- Hayim Yitzhak Barda (1991). Responsa Yitzhak Yeranen; article: Inquiry into the Pronunciation of Letters and Punctuation, Whether according to the Sephardic Jews, or the Ashkenazim and Yemenites (by Meir Mazuz) (in Hebrew). Vol. 4. pp. 51 (section 9).
- Idelsohn, Abraham Z. (1917). Phonographierte Gesänge und Aussprachsproben des Hebräischen der jemenitischen, persischen und syrischen Juden. Vienna. (German)
- Pinhas Halevi, Yoav, ed. (1990). Maḥberet Kitrei Ha-Torah (in Hebrew). Benei Barak.
