= Shva =

Hebrew niqqud vowel sign

Shva
ְ
IPA	Modern Hebrew: /e/ ([e̞]), Ø
IPA	Biblical Hebrew: /a/, /i/
Transliteration	e, ' (apostrophe), nothing
English example	men, menorah
Example
The word shva in Hebrew. The first vowel (under Shin, marked with red) is itself a shva.
Other Niqqud
Shva · Hiriq · Tzere · Segol · Patach · Kamatz · Holam · Dagesh · Mappiq · Shuruk · Kubutz · Rafe · Sin/Shin Dot

Shva or, in Biblical Hebrew, shĕwa (Hebrew: שְׁוָא) is a Hebrew niqqud vowel sign written as two vertical dots ( ְ ) beneath a letter. It indicates either the phoneme /ə/ (shva na', mobile shva) or the complete absence of a vowel (/Ø/) (shva naḥ, resting shva).

It is transliterated as ⟨e⟩, ⟨ĕ⟩, ⟨ə⟩, ⟨'⟩ (apostrophe), or nothing. Note that use of ⟨ə⟩ for shva is questionable: transliterating Modern Hebrew shva naḥ with ⟨ə⟩ is misleading, since it is never actually pronounced [ə] – a mid central vowel (IPA [ə]) does not exist in Modern Hebrew. The vowel [ə] was pronounced as a full vowel in earlier Hebrew varieties such as Tiberian vocalization, where it was phonetically usually identical to short [a], in Palestinian vocalization appears as short [e] or [i], and in Babylonian vocalization as [a]. In early Greek and Latin transliterations of Hebrew such as the Hexapla, it appears as [ε] and [e], respectively.

A shva sign in combination with the vowel diacritics patáḥ, segól, and qamatz produces a ḥatáf: a diacritic for a tnuʿá ḥatufá (a 'reduced vowel' – lit. 'abducted vowel'). In Tiberian Hebrew, these were pronounced identical to the short vowels [a], [ɛ], and [ɔ].

== Pronunciation in Modern Hebrew ==
In Modern Hebrew, shva is either pronounced /e/ or is mute (Ø), regardless of its traditional classification as shva nach (שְׁוָא נָח) or shva na (שְׁוָא נָע), see following table for examples. The Israeli standard for its transliteration is ⟨e⟩ only for a pronounced shva na (i.e., one which is pronounced /e/), and no representation in transliteration if the shva is mute.

In Modern Hebrew, a shva is pronounced /e/ under the following conditions:

Condition for /e/ pronunciation of shva in Israeli Hebrew	Examples			Examples for silent shva (since condition does not apply)		
Condition for /e/ pronunciation of shva in Israeli Hebrew	In Hebrew	IPA	translation	In Hebrew	IPA	translation
1. When under the first of two letters, both representing the same consonant or consonants with identical place and manner of articulation:	שָׁכְחוּ	/ʃaχeˈχu/	they forgot	מָכְרוּ	/maχˈru/	they sold
1. When under the first of two letters, both representing the same consonant or consonants with identical place and manner of articulation:	שָׁדַדְתְּ	/ʃaˈdadet/	you (f.) robbed	שָׁלַלְתְּ	/ʃaˈlalt/	you (feminine) negated
2. When under the first letter of a word, if this letter is a sonorant in modern pronunciation, i.e. י (/j/), ל (/l/), מ (/m/), נ (/n/) or ר (/r/)^{[*]}:	נְמָלִים	/nemaˈlim/	ants	גְּמָלִים	/ɡmaˈlim/	camels
2. When under the first letter of a word, if this letter is a sonorant in modern pronunciation, i.e. י (/j/), ל (/l/), מ (/m/), נ (/n/) or ר (/r/)^{[*]}:	מְנִיָּה	/meniˈja/	counting	בְּנִיָּה	/bniˈja/	building
3. When under the first letter of a word, if the second letter is a glottal consonant, i.e. א (/ʔ/), ה (/h/) or ע (/ʕ/ or /ʔ/):	תְּאָרִים	/teaˈrim/	titles	מִתְאָרִים	/mitʔaˈrim/	outlines
3. When under the first letter of a word, if the second letter is a glottal consonant, i.e. א (/ʔ/), ה (/h/) or ע (/ʕ/ or /ʔ/):	תְּאָרִים	/teaˈrim/	titles	תְּמָרִים	/tmaˈrim/	dates
4. When under the first letter of a word, if this letter represents one of the prefix-morphemes; 1. ב (/be/) = amongst others "in", 2. ו (/ve/) = "and", 3. כ (/ke/) = amongst others "as" or "approximately", 4. ל (/le/) = amongst others "to", dative marker and verb prefix in infinitive, 5. ת (/te/) as future tense verb prefix:	בְּרֵיחָהּ	/berejˈχa/	in her scent	בְּרֵיכָה	/brejˈχa/	pool
4. When under the first letter of a word, if this letter represents one of the prefix-morphemes; 1. ב (/be/) = amongst others "in", 2. ו (/ve/) = "and", 3. כ (/ke/) = amongst others "as" or "approximately", 4. ל (/le/) = amongst others "to", dative marker and verb prefix in infinitive, 5. ת (/te/) as future tense verb prefix:	בְּחִישָׁה	/beχiˈʃa/	in sensing	בְּחִישָׁה	/bχiˈʃa/	stirring
4. When under the first letter of a word, if this letter represents one of the prefix-morphemes; 1. ב (/be/) = amongst others "in", 2. ו (/ve/) = "and", 3. כ (/ke/) = amongst others "as" or "approximately", 4. ל (/le/) = amongst others "to", dative marker and verb prefix in infinitive, 5. ת (/te/) as future tense verb prefix:	וְרוֹדִים	/veroˈdim/	and (they) tyrannize	וְרוּדִים	/vruˈdim/	pink (m.p.)
4. When under the first letter of a word, if this letter represents one of the prefix-morphemes; 1. ב (/be/) = amongst others "in", 2. ו (/ve/) = "and", 3. כ (/ke/) = amongst others "as" or "approximately", 4. ל (/le/) = amongst others "to", dative marker and verb prefix in infinitive, 5. ת (/te/) as future tense verb prefix:	כְּרָזָה	/keraˈza/	as a thin person	כְּרָזָה	/kraˈza/	poster
4. When under the first letter of a word, if this letter represents one of the prefix-morphemes; 1. ב (/be/) = amongst others "in", 2. ו (/ve/) = "and", 3. כ (/ke/) = amongst others "as" or "approximately", 4. ל (/le/) = amongst others "to", dative marker and verb prefix in infinitive, 5. ת (/te/) as future tense verb prefix:	לְפָּרִיז	/lepaˈriz/	to Paris			
4. When under the first letter of a word, if this letter represents one of the prefix-morphemes; 1. ב (/be/) = amongst others "in", 2. ו (/ve/) = "and", 3. כ (/ke/) = amongst others "as" or "approximately", 4. ל (/le/) = amongst others "to", dative marker and verb prefix in infinitive, 5. ת (/te/) as future tense verb prefix:	תְּבַלּוּ	/tevaˈlu/	you (m. p.) will have a good time	תְּבַלּוּל	/tvaˈlul/	cataract
5. (In non standard language usage) if one of the morphemes mentioned above (ב /be/, ו /ve/, כ /ke/, ל /le/ or ת /te/) or one of the morphemes מ /mi/ ("from") or ש /ʃe/ ("that") is added as a prefix to a word, which without this prefix begins with a letter marked with a shva pronounced /e/ under the above conditions, this shva will retain its /e/-pronunciation also with the prefix:	מִצְּעָדִים	/mitseaˈdim/	from steps	מִצְּמָדִים	/mitsmaˈdim/	from pairs
5. (In non standard language usage) if one of the morphemes mentioned above (ב /be/, ו /ve/, כ /ke/, ל /le/ or ת /te/) or one of the morphemes מ /mi/ ("from") or ש /ʃe/ ("that") is added as a prefix to a word, which without this prefix begins with a letter marked with a shva pronounced /e/ under the above conditions, this shva will retain its /e/-pronunciation also with the prefix:	מִצְּעָדִים	/mitseaˈdim/	from steps	מִצְעָדִים	/mitsʔaˈdim/	parades
5. (In non standard language usage) if one of the morphemes mentioned above (ב /be/, ו /ve/, כ /ke/, ל /le/ or ת /te/) or one of the morphemes מ /mi/ ("from") or ש /ʃe/ ("that") is added as a prefix to a word, which without this prefix begins with a letter marked with a shva pronounced /e/ under the above conditions, this shva will retain its /e/-pronunciation also with the prefix:	מִרְוָחִים	/mirevaˈχim/	from blanks	מִרְוָחִים	/mirvaˈχim/	intervals
5. (In non standard language usage) if one of the morphemes mentioned above (ב /be/, ו /ve/, כ /ke/, ל /le/ or ת /te/) or one of the morphemes מ /mi/ ("from") or ש /ʃe/ ("that") is added as a prefix to a word, which without this prefix begins with a letter marked with a shva pronounced /e/ under the above conditions, this shva will retain its /e/-pronunciation also with the prefix:	standard: מֵרְוָחִים –/merevaˈχim/			מִרְוָחִים	/mirvaˈχim/	intervals
5. (In non standard language usage) if one of the morphemes mentioned above (ב /be/, ו /ve/, כ /ke/, ל /le/ or ת /te/) or one of the morphemes מ /mi/ ("from") or ש /ʃe/ ("that") is added as a prefix to a word, which without this prefix begins with a letter marked with a shva pronounced /e/ under the above conditions, this shva will retain its /e/-pronunciation also with the prefix:	לַאֲרָיוֹת וְלְנְמֵרִים יֵשׁ פַּרְוָה	/laˈaraˈjot velenemerim…/	Lions and tigers have fur			
5. (In non standard language usage) if one of the morphemes mentioned above (ב /be/, ו /ve/, כ /ke/, ל /le/ or ת /te/) or one of the morphemes מ /mi/ ("from") or ש /ʃe/ ("that") is added as a prefix to a word, which without this prefix begins with a letter marked with a shva pronounced /e/ under the above conditions, this shva will retain its /e/-pronunciation also with the prefix:	standard: וְלִנְמֵרִים /…velinmeˈrim…/					
5. (In non standard language usage) if one of the morphemes mentioned above (ב /be/, ו /ve/, כ /ke/, ל /le/ or ת /te/) or one of the morphemes מ /mi/ ("from") or ש /ʃe/ ("that") is added as a prefix to a word, which without this prefix begins with a letter marked with a shva pronounced /e/ under the above conditions, this shva will retain its /e/-pronunciation also with the prefix:	וְכְּיְלָדִים שִׂחַקְנוּ בַּחוּץ	/vekejelaˈdim…/	And as children we played outside			
5. (In non standard language usage) if one of the morphemes mentioned above (ב /be/, ו /ve/, כ /ke/, ל /le/ or ת /te/) or one of the morphemes מ /mi/ ("from") or ש /ʃe/ ("that") is added as a prefix to a word, which without this prefix begins with a letter marked with a shva pronounced /e/ under the above conditions, this shva will retain its /e/-pronunciation also with the prefix:	standard: וְכִילָדִים – /veχilaˈdim…/					
6. (Usually – see counterexamples^{[**]}) when under a medial letter, before whose pronunciation a consonant was pronounced:	אִשְׁפְּזוּ	/iʃpeˈzu/	they hospitalized	אִישׁ פְּזוּר דַּעַת	/iʃ pzur ˈda.at/	an absentminded man

=== Counterexamples ===
One exception to rule 2 seems to be מְלַאי /mlaj/ 'inventory' (although according to the New User-Friendly Hebrew-English Dictionary (Arie Comey, Naomi Tsur; Achiasaf, 2006), the word is instead pronounced /meˈlai/); the absence of a vowel after the מ (/m/) might be attributable to the high sonority of the subsequent liquid ל (/l/), compare with מְלִית (/meˈlit/, not /*mlit/) 'filling' (in cuisine).

Exceptions to rule 6 include פְּסַנְתְּרָן (/psantˈran/, not */psanteˈran/ – 'pianist'), אַנְגְּלִית (/aŋˈɡlit/, not */aŋɡeˈlit/ – 'English'), נַשְׁפְּרִיץ (/naʃˈprit͡s/, not */naʃpeˈrit͡s/ – 'we will sprinkle'), several inflections of quinqueliteral roots – e.g.: סִנְכְּרֵן (/sinˈkren/, not */sinkeˈren/ – 'he synchronized'); חִנְטְרֵשׁ (/χinˈtreʃ/, not */χinteˈreʃ/ – 'he did stupid things'); הִתְפְלַרְטֵט (/hitflarˈtet/, not */hitfelartet/ – 'he had a flirt') – as well as other, more recent loanwords, e.g. מַנְטְרַה (/ˈmantra/, not */mantera/ – 'mantra').

In earlier forms of Hebrew, shva na and nach were phonologically and phonetically distinguishable, but the two variants resulting from Modern Hebrew phonology no longer conform to the traditional classification, e.g. while the (first) shva nach in the phrase סִפְרֵי תורה ('books of the Law') is correctly pronounced in Modern Hebrew /sifrei torah/ with the פ (or /f/ sound) being mute, the shva na in זְמַן ('time') in Modern Hebrew is often pronounced as a mute Shva (/zman/). In religious contexts, however, scrupulous readers of the prayers and scriptures do still differentiate properly between Shva Nach and Shva Na (e.g. zĕman).

== Traditional classification ==
In traditional Hebrew grammar, a shva is categorized according to several attributes of its grammatical context. The three categories of shva relevant to the prescriptive grammar of Modern Hebrew are shva naʻ (שווא נע), shva naḥ (שווא נח) and the less common shva meraḥef (שווא מרחף). When discussing Tiberian pronunciation, some shvas are classified as shva gaʻya (שווא געיה). The following table summarizes four distinguishing attributes which determine these categories:

- Does the shva supersede a vowel or no vowel in the word's non-inflected form?
- Is the preceding letter pointed with a "short" or a "long" niqqud variant?
- Is the following letter, when בג״ד כפ״ת, pointed with a dagesh qal or not?
- Is the letter pointed with shva assigned to the preceding or following syllable?

To help illustrate the first criterion (existence or non-existence of a vowel in the word's non inflected form), the location of the shva (i.e., the place within the word where the lack of vowel is indicated by it) is marked within the phonemic transcription with an orange linguistic zero: Ø; if existing, the corresponding vowel in the basic (non inflected) form of the example is also marked in orange.

type of shva	example			non inflected form of example			standard syllabification	attributes:			
type of shva	example			non inflected form of example			standard syllabification	supersedes in non inflected form:	preceding letter's niqqud:	following letter with / without dagesh qal:	assigned to syllable:
naʻ	עֵרְבוֹנוֹת	/erØvoˈnot/	(deposits)	עֵרָבוֹן	/eraˈvon/	(deposit)	עֵ—רְבוֹ—נוֹת	vowel	long	without	following
naḥ	עֶלְבּוֹנוֹת	/elØboˈnot/	(insults)	עֶלְבּוֹן	/elØˈbon/	(insult)	עֶלְ—בּוֹ—נוֹת	no vowel	short	with	preceding
meraḥef	יֶאֶרְכוּ	/je.erØˈχu/	(they will last)	יֶאֱרַךְ	/je.eˈraχ/	(it will last)	יֶ—אֶרְ—כוּ	vowel	short	without	preceding

=== Shva Naʻ ===
In most cases, traditional Hebrew grammar considers shva naʻ "mobile shva" to supersede a vowel that exists in the basic form of a word but was reduced due to inflection or declension. Additionally, any shva marked under an initial letter is classified shva naʻ.

Identifying a shva as shva naʻ is relevant to the application of niqqud in Tiberian Hebrew, e.g., a בג״ד כפ״ת letter following a letter marked with a shva naʻ may not be marked with a dagesh qal; the vowel preceding a letter marked with a shva naʻ must be represented by the "long" niqqud variant for that vowel: qamats and not pataḥ, tsere and not segol, etc.^{[↑]}. Furthermore, in the standard syllabification, the letter under which a shva naʻ is marked is grouped with the following syllable.

The Academy of the Hebrew Language's transliteration guidelines specify that shva naʻ should be transliterated only if pronounced in Modern Hebrew, in which case ⟨e⟩ be used for general purposes and ⟨ĕ⟩ for precise transliteration. Shva naʻ is sometimes transliterated ⟨ə⟩. However, this symbol is misleading since it is commonly used in linguistics to denote the vowel schwa, which does not exist in Modern Hebrew.

A shva naʻ can be identified with the following criteria:

1. When marked under the first letter of a word, as in מְרַחֵף, לְפָנָי, and שְׁמַע,
2. When marked under the first of two identical letters,
3. When it's the second of two shvas marked under two consecutive letters (except when marked under the last letter of a word), as in רַעְמְסֵס ramʻasēs (Exo. 12:37) and וישְׁמְעו wišmaʻu (Gen. 3:8),
4. When the letter before the one under which it is marked is marked with a "long" niqqud variant,^{[↑]}, such as the long vowel of either yod or ḥiriq, as in יְחִֽידְֿךָ (Gen. 22:2) (yiḥiḏaḵā), or the long vowel of wāw or ḥolam, as in the words הוֹלְכִֿים, יוֹדְֿעִים and מוֹכְֿרִים (holaḵim, yodaʻim and moḵarim) and שֹׁפְטִים וְשֹׁטְרִים (Deut. 16:18), "šofaṭim wašoṭarim."
5. When marked under a letter with a dagesh ḥazaq (historically an indicator of gemination), as מִפְּנֵיכֶם (Lev. 18:24) and מִקְּדָֿשׁ (Exo. 15:17).

For a more detailed account, see Tiberian vocalization § Vowel diacritics

=== Shva Naḥ ===
Traditional Hebrew grammar defines shva naḥ, or shva quiescens, as indicating the absence of a vowel. In Modern Hebrew, some shvas classified as shva naḥ are nonetheless pronounced /e/ (e.g. the shva under the second dalet in the word שָׁדַדְתְּ – /ʃaˈdadet/ – "you (f.) robbed"; see table above).

In a few cases, a shva not conforming to the criteria listed above is classified as shva naḥ. This offers no conclusive indication as to its pronunciation in Modern Hebrew; it is, however, relevant to the application of standard niqqud, e.g.: a בג״ד כפ״ת letter following a letter marked with a shva nacḥ must be marked with a dagesh qal (Modern Hebrew phonology sometimes disagrees with this linguistic prescription, as in לְפַסְפֵס – "to miss" – in which the second pe lacks a dagesh qal although preceded by a shva naḥ), or: the vowel prior to a letter marked with a shva naḥ must be represented by the "short" niqqud-variant for that vowel: pataḥ and not qamats, segol and not tsere etc.^{[↑]}. Furthermore, in standard syllabification, the letter under which a shva naḥ is marked is grouped with the preceding syllable.

The Academy of the Hebrew Language's transliteration guidelines specify that shva naḥ should not be represented in transliteration.

=== Shva Meraḥef ===
"Shva meraḥef" is the grammatical designation of a shva which does not comply with all criteria characterizing a shva naʻ (specifically, one marked under a letter following a letter marked with a "short", not a "long", niqqud-variant^{[↑]}), but which does, like a shva na’, supersede a vowel (or a shva na’) that exists in the primary form of a word but not after this word underwent inflection or declension.

The classification of a shva as shva meraḥef is relevant to the application of standard niqqud, e.g.: a בג״ד כפ״ת letter following a letter marked with a shva meraḥef should not be marked with a dagesh qal. The vowel preceding this letter could be represented by the short niqqud-variant for that vowel.^{[↑]} This sometimes, but not always, reflects pronunciation in Modern Hebrew; e.g. מַלְכֵי ('kings of') is commonly pronounced in accordance with the standard form, /malˈχej/ (with no dagesh qal in the letter kaf), whereas כַּלְבֵי ('dogs of'), whose standard pronunciation is /kalˈvej/, is commonly pronounced /kalˈbej/ (as if there were a dagesh qal in the letter bet). In standard syllabification, the letter under which a shva meraḥef is marked is grouped with the preceding syllable.

=== Shva Gaʻya ===
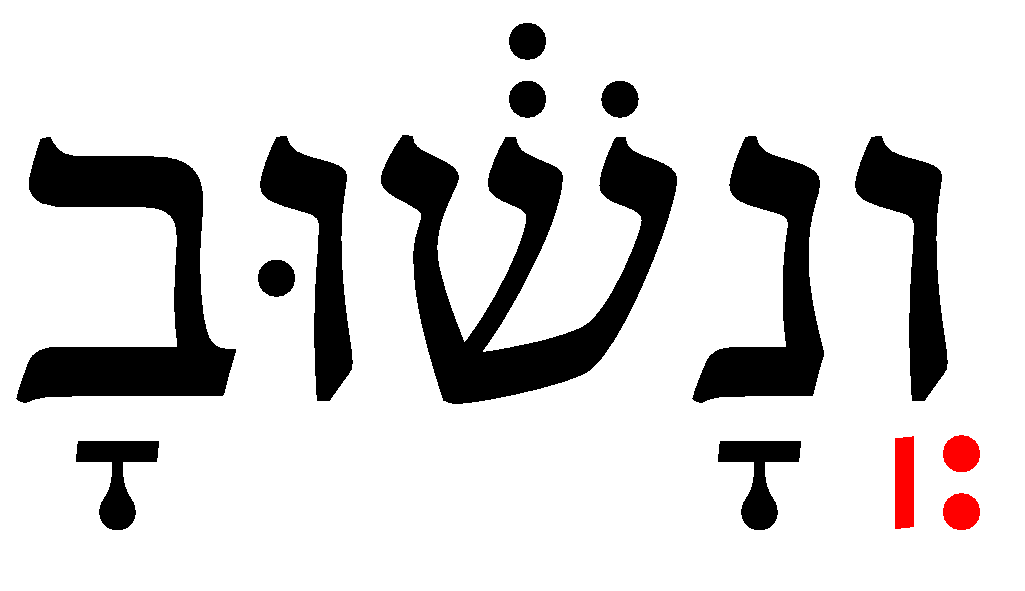
The word /wanā'šuḇā/ in the Book of Lamentations (Lamentations) 5:21. According to some traditions, the gaʻya in the word (marked in red) renders the shva stressed. In the Sephardic tradition, the pronunciation is ['vana'šuva].

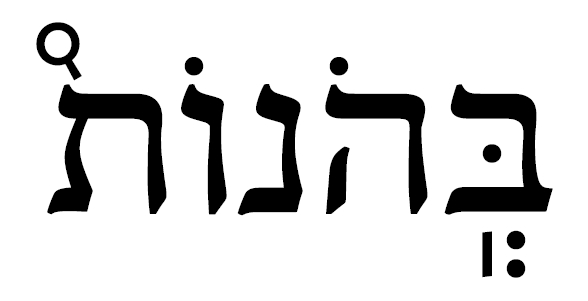
Shva gaʻya designates a shva marked under a letter that is also marked with the cantillation mark gaʻya (גַּעְיָה lit. 'bleating' or 'bellowing'), or meteg, e.g. the shva under the letter bet in the word בְּהוֹנוֹת "toes" would normally be classified a shva naʻ and be transliterated ⟨e⟩: behonót (or according to the precise standard, ⟨ĕ⟩: bĕhonót). However, if marked with the gaʻya cantillation mark, , this shva is classified as shva gaʻya, and the transliteration believed to reflect its historical pronunciation would be bohonót. This "strict application" is found in Yemenite Hebrew.

== T'nua hatufa ==
Within niqqud, vowel diacritics are sorted into three groups: big, small and fleeting or furtive (t'nuot g'dolot תנועות גדולות, t'nuot k'tanot תנועות קטנות and t'nuot chatufot תנועות חטופות), sometimes also referred to as long, short and very short or ultrashort. This grouping might have correlated to different vowel lengths in earlier forms of Hebrew (see Tiberian vocalization → Vowels; spoken Israeli Hebrew however does not distinguish between different vowel lengths, thus this orthographic differentiation is not manifest in speech).

The vowel diacritics classified as chatufot ('fleeting') all share the common feature of being a digraph of a small vowel diacritic (Patach, Segol or Kamatz Katan) plus a shva sign. Similarly, their names are derived from the respective small vowel diacritic's name plus the adjunct chataf: chataf patach, chataf segol and chataf kamatz.

As with a shva na, standard (prescribed) syllabification determines that letters pointed with a fleeting vowel diacritic be considered part of the subsequent syllable, even if in modern Hebrew pronunciation this diacritic represents a full-fledged syllable, thus e.g. the phonologically trisyllabic word הֶעֱמִיד ('he placed upright'), pronounced Hebrew pronunciation: [/he.eˈmid/], should standardly be syllabified into only two syllables, הֶ—עֱמִיד (he'emid).

Name	Symbol	Israeli Hebrew		
Name	Symbol	IPA	Transliteration	English approximate
Reduced Segol (ẖatáf segól)		[e̞]	e	men
Reduced Patach ("ẖatáf patáẖ")		[ä]	a	spa
Reduced Kamatz ("ẖatáf kamáts")		[o̞]	o	cone
Reduced Hiriq ("ẖatáf ẖiríq") – not in current use, appears rarely in the Aleppo Codex		[i]	i	it

=== Comparison table ===
Vowel comparison table
Vowel Length (phonetically not manifested in Israeli Hebrew)			IPA		Transliteration	English approximate	Notes
Long	Short	Very Short	phonemic	phonetic	Transliteration	English approximate	Notes
סָ	סַ	סֲ	/a/	[ä]	a	spa	see open central unrounded vowel
סֵ	סֶ	סֱ	/e/	[e̞]	e	temp	see mid front unrounded vowel
סוֹ	סׇ	סֳ	/o/	[o̞]	o	cone	see mid back rounded vowel
סוּ	סֻ	n/a	/u/	[u]	u	doom	
סִי	סִ	n/a	/i/	[i]	i	ski	
Note I:		By adding two vertical dots (shva) ְ the vowel is made very short.					
Note II:		The short o is usually promoted to a long o in Israeli writing for the sake of disambiguation					
Note III:		The short u is usually promoted to a long u in Israeli writing for the sake of disambiguation					

== Unicode encoding ==
Glyph	Unicode	Name
ְ	U+05B0	HEBREW POINT SHEVA
ֱ	U+05B1	HEBREW POINT HATAF SEGOL
ֲ	U+05B2	HEBREW POINT HATAF PATAH
ֳ	U+05B3	HEBREW POINT HATAF QAMATS

As of 2016, a separate Unicode symbol for the sheva na has been proposed but not implemented.

== See also ==
- Niqqudot
- Mid central vowel
- Tiberian vocalization
- Arabic diacritics#Sukūn

== Notes ==
^{↑} Long and short niqqud-variants represent identical spoken vowels in Modern Hebrew; the orthographic distinction is, however, still observed in standard spelling.

== Bibliography ==
- Gesenius' Hebrew Grammar, §10
