= Asuppim =

Biblical location or set of locations in the Second Temple

According to the Hebrew Bible, the Asuppim (Biblical Hebrew: אֲסֻפִּים ʾĂsuppīm) was a location or set of locations in the Second Temple. The word appears to be a masculine plural noun formed of the root אספ gather, and is usually translated "storehouses". The word appears three times in the Hebrew Bible, once in Neh 12:25 (construct state, "Asuppim of the gates") and twice in 1 Chr 26. Levite guards were stationed at the Asuppim. In Nehemiah, the guards of the Asuppim are given as follows: Mattaniah, Bakbukiah, Obadiah, Meshullam, Talmon, and Akkub. In 1 Chronicles, the guarding of the Asuppim is given to "the sons of Obed-Edom" who guard it "two by two (שנים שנים)". John Lightfoot argues the Asuppim was located along the western wall of the Temple, though David Qimḥi, pseudo-Abraham b. David, David Altschuler, and Alexander Bennett M'Grigor put it to the south.

== Etymology and translation ==
=== Proposal of ספפ ===
Many early commentators, including pseudo-Solomon b. Isaac on Nehemiah, (Note: This commentary on Ezra-Nehemiah, attributed to Solomon b. Isaac by printings, was composed by a different 12th-century French sage. Pseudo-Solomon b. Isaac on 1 Chronicles may have been written by disciples of a certain 12th-century French Saadia (not Saadia b. Joseph); a commentary by "Saadia's disciples" is quoted by Tosafoth Yoma 9a, the quotation matches pseudo-Solomon b. Isaac on 1 Chronicles, and the author of that commentary makes repeated reference to his time learning in Narbonne, though H.J. Matthews doubts the value of this evidence. However, there are important stylistic differences between pseudo-Solomon b. Isaac on Chronicles and pseudo-Solomon b. Isaac on Nehemiah, plus the conflict discussed on this page, so their authorship is probably not shared.) pseudo-Abraham b. Meir b. Ezra (Moses Qimḥi), (Note: Printings attribute this commentary on Nehemiah to Abraham b. Meir b. Ezra, but it has been conclusively proven to be the work of Moses Qimḥi instead.) Jacob b. Meir, pseudo-Saadia b. Joseph (pseudo-Benjamin b. Judah), (Note: In most MSS this commentary on Nehemiah is anonymous. MS Milan G23 attributes it to Saadia b. Joseph, as do some recent publications, but this attribution has been rejected by scholars. Among other evidences, this commentary is clearly by the same author as pseudo-Saadiah on the Book of Daniel, which commentary is nothing like Saadia b. Joseph's genuine Judeo-Arabic commentary on Daniel. MS Munich 60 attributes it to Benjamin b. Judah of Rome (1290-1330), and its similarity to Isaiah di Trani's commentary agrees with a southern Italian origin; this attribution was accepted by Heinrich Berger in his 1895 edition; however, it is not in the same style as other Biblical commentaries attributed to Benjamin b. Judah and Benjamin's proposed authorship has been rejected by H. J. Matthews, Shlomo Zalman Haim Halberstam, Abraham Berliner, Adolf Neubauer, and other scholars. Aside from evidence connecting this commentary to "Saadia" on Daniel and the inaccurate attribution to Saadia b. Joseph, three medieval authors quote it in the name of "Saadia" and the British Library MS may attribute it to "Saadia" as well; attempted attributees of this commentary named Saadia include the poet Saadia b. Nachmani, Saadia b. Joseph, "Saadia" the author of morning Viduy, and the "Saadia" mentioned by Jakar b. Qalonimus, a student of Solomon b. Isaac.) and Isaiah di Trani, (Note: As with many of their works, it is not conclusively known whether this commentary on Nehemiah is the work of Isaiah di Trani or Isaiah di Trani the Younger. It was traditionally attributed to the elder sage, but Moritz Güdemann argues for the younger based on similarities with his other works.) trace the root of Asuppim to ספפ terminate, (Note: The meaning of the verb ספפ is not definitively known, and dictionaries include "guard", "terminate", "spread out", and "meaning unknown". What is known is that it is the source of סף and ספא, "threshold".) for the translation "thresholds" or "entrances", as do Meir Leibush Wisser, Julius Bate, the King James Version to Nehemiah, and some moderns (see § Modern consensus). The Targum to 1 Chronicles translates Asuppim as שקפיא threshold, the same translation used for ספפ elsewhere. The Peshitta to Nehemiah is missing the last three words of 12:25, (Note: Syriac: ܡܬܢܝܐ ܘܒܩܝ܂ ܘܥܘܒܕܝܐ܂ ܘܫܠܘܡ܂ ܘܐܛܠܡܢ ܘܥܩܘܦ ܢܿܛܪ ܬܪܥܐ܂ Translation: "Methanya, and Baqi, and Oubdaya, and Shalum, and Atlam, and Aquph, guards of the gates".) but the Peshitta to 1 Chronicles translates ܣ̈ܦܐ (Note: In block script: ספא (סִפָּא). From ספפ.) threshold. The Vulgate translates vestibulorum "entrances" (ספפ) in Nehemiah, which Loring Woart Batten, Paul Mankowski, and Jonas C. Greenfield accept. Confirmation for the classical conflation of אספ with ספפ or another root meaning "entrance structure" comes from Aramaic and Akkadian parallels and Dead Sea Scrolls, including the Temple Scroll, where אספ often means threshold.

=== Proposal of יספ ===
Other early commentators, including pseudo-Solomon b. Isaac on b. Tamid, (Note: Authorship unknown, not the same as any pseudo-Solomon b. Isaac on the Bible, usually now printed under "Mefaresh" because it cites Solomon b. Isaac's genuine commentary to b. Shabbat on b. Tamid 25b. Bezalel Ashkenazi writes that it is assembled from Solomon b. Isaac's commentary on b. Yoma, but the explanation of Asuppim is not found there. Variously attributed to Shemaiah of Soissons, though there is a different commentary to b. Tamid under his name found MS Opp. 726 and published by Fuchs (2000), and Isaac b. Baruch, a Tosafist, though pseudo-Abraham b. David quotes a different commentary in his name.) pseudo-Gershom b. Judah, (Note: Abraham Epstein has shown that this commentary to the Talmud, commonly printed under Gershom b. Judah's name, is actually a collection of commentaries from the school of Isaac b. Judah of Mainz (c. 1064-1100).) pseudo-Abraham b. David (Baruch b. Isaac), (Note: This commentary to Tamid, attributed to Abraham b. David by printings, was instead written by a different German sage. Abraham Epstein proposed Baruch b. Isaac, though Ephraim Urbach disagrees.) pseudo-Asher b. Jehiel. (Note: Abraham Epstein has challenged the printings' attribution of this commentary on Tamid to Asher b. Jehiel. It explicitly conflicts with the genuine Asher b. Jehiel commentary on b. Berakhot.) and the Anonymous German Commentary to b. Tamid, (Note: The AGCT apparently believed יספ and אספ were the same, describing the Assupim as "תוספות" but also that they "נתאספו".) traced Asuppim to יספ append, for "additions," so-named because they had been added (יספ) onto the larger structure. Yechezkel Kutscher agreed יספ was the root of Assupim but translated "additions [next to entrances]" (see § Akkadian loanword).

=== Proposal of אספ ===
The Vulgate (only on 1 Chronicles) and some early commentators, including Levi b. Gershon and Menachem Meiri, held to the plain etymology אספ gather, for "assembly". Levi b. Gershon thought they were so-named because they were the places "where Levites gathered (אספ) to guard the gates," which Richard Brown accepts. Meiri thought they were so-called because "they were the places where the Levites gathered (אספ) to perform commandments". The translation of Asuppim as assembly (אספ) is used by the Vulgate for "assembly of elders" in 1 Chronicles (see below).

Immanuel Tremellius and most modern scholars, including Lightfoot, Julius Fürst, Carl Friedrich Keil, Herbert Edward Ryle, Wilhelm Gesenius, Charles Ellicott, Ernst Wilhelm Hengstenberg, Joshua Hughes-Games, Ernst Bertheau, George Williams, Charles Cutler Torrey, and Mitchell Dahood, use אספ gather but translate storehouses, where treasure or supplies were gathered (אספ); in support of this translation is 2 Chronicles 25:24, which describes "All the gold and the silver and all the vessels, which were found in the House of Yahweh with Obed-Edom", (Note: Hebrew: כָֽל־הַזָּהָ֣ב וְהַכֶּ֡סֶף וְאֵ֣ת כָּל־הַ֠כֵּלִים הַנִּמְצְאִ֨ים בְּבֵית־הָאֱלֹהִ֜ים עִם־עֹבֵ֣ד אֱד֗וֹם) whose sons guard the Asuppim in 1 Chronicles. This is the approach of most modern translations and dictionaries (see § Modern consensus).

The Vulgate and some modern commentators, including Hengstenberg and Adolf Kamphausen, associate Asuppim with the Ba'alei Asuppoth (Hebrew: בַּעֲלֵי אֲסֻפּוֹת, usually translated "masters of anthologies (אספ)" but by the Vulgate, magistrorum concilium "masters of assemblies (אספ)" and by Hengstenberg, "authors in the library (אספ)"), mentioned Ecclesiastes 12:11. The words Asuppim and Asuppoth are etymological equivalents, and the use of the female suffix (Note: Asuppim has the male plural suffix and Asuppoth the female.) in Ecclesiastes enables a rhyme with dar'bonoth (דרבנות goads); variant Ba'alei Asuppim (בעלי אספים) is found in the poetry of Eleazar b. Kalir for a different rhyme. The Vulgate uses the connection to translate Asuppim seniorum concilium "assembly (אספ) of elders" in 1 Chronicles 26:15.

Mayer Sulzberger connects Asuppim to וַיֶּאֱסֹף and he gathered in Genesis 42:17, where Joseph "gathers" his brothers into prison, for the translation prison. Many translate Genesis 42:17's use of אספ gather "imprisoned" from context, but this usage is otherwise unique. Rabbinic commentators understand the use of אספ gather to imply that force was not used, and extrapolation is difficult because וַיֶּאֱסֹף wa-ye'esoph seems to be a deliberate pun on יוֹסֵף Yoseph. Onqelos, pseudo-Jonathan, and the Samaritan Targum render it כנש gathered, LXX has ἔθετο placed, the Vulgate has "tradidit" delivered, and the Peshitta has ܪܡܝ (Note: Block script: רמי (רְמֵי)) cast down, but Neofiti renders חבש imprisoned.

=== Akkadian loanword ===
The Akkadian word asuppu, of unknown etymology but possibly related to ספפ terminate or יספ append, was first connected to the phonologically similar Asuppim by Godfrey Rolles Driver and this connection has since been widely acknowledged. Mankowski argues the QaTuL pattern of אָסֹף asop, not indigenous to Biblical Hebrew for nouns, independently indicates that it is a loanword. However, David M. Clemens argues it might not be a loanword and could have formed from an indigenous QaTuL-pattern adjective which acquired a nominal usage. Corey Michael Peacock also rejects any connection between Asuppim and asuppu, arguing the contexts in Nehemiah and 1 Chronicles demand a gate-specific definition for Asuppim.

The Chicago Assyrian Dictionary defines asuppu as "a type of building erected of less durable materials than a house, used in outbuildings and on top of buildings." Mankowski suggests, for "less durable materials," bound reeds or thatch (compare Hebrew סוף sup "reeds" and Egyptian ṭwfi "reeds"). Heather D. Baker says asuppus were unroofed and notes that "[I]nsubstantial structures have occasionally been excavated within house courtyards" and "It is possible, but not certain, that these remains correspond to the Akkadian term asuppu." Peacock suggests asuppu is synonymous with the Biblical Hebrew סכה sukkah. Holger Gzella translates אָסֹף asop and Akkadian asuppu "gate area". Kutscher translates asuppu "additions next to entrances", Markham Geller, "vestibule", and David B. Weisberg, "attic room".

=== LXX and as a proper noun ===
In place of the MT's Nehemiah 12:25, (Note: Hebrew: מַתַּנְיָ֧ה וּבַקְבֻּֽקְיָ֛ה עֹבַדְיָ֥ה מְשֻׁלָּ֖ם טַלְמ֣וֹן עַקּ֑וּב שֹׁמְרִ֤ים שֽׁוֹעֲרִים֙ מִשְׁמָ֔ר בַּאֲסֻפֵּ֖י הַשְּׁעָרִֽים׃ KJV: Mattaniah, Bakbukiah, Obadiah, Meshullam, Talmon, and Akkub were gatekeepers keeping the watch at the [Asuppim] of the gates.) LXX has only ἐν τῷ συναγαγεῖν με τοὺς πυλωροὺς When I gathered the gatekeepers, apparently lacking all but the final two words of the verse and reading (Note: Biblical Hebrew was consonantal in ancient times and באספי השערים can be fairly vocalized in either manner.) בְּאַסְּפִי הַשֹׁעֲרִים When I gathered the gatekeepers instead of MT בַּאֲסֻפֵּי הַשְּׁעָרִים . . . at the Asuppim of the gates. LXX does not translate but rather transliterates the mentions in 1 Chronicles as ἐσεφίμ (Vat.) Esephim or ασαφείν (Alex.) Asaphein. (Note: Other variants: ασαφ, ασαφίμ, αεσίμ, εσαφείν, ασαφείμ, εσεφη, ασαφεί, ασαφίν, αατίφ.) David Altschuler and Alexander Bennett M'Grigor also assume Asuppim is a proper noun, as does pseudo-Solomon b. Isaac on 1 Chronicles. (Note: This commentary on Chronicles, attributed to Solomon b. Isaac by printings, was composed by neither him nor the author of pseudo-Solomon b. Isaac on Nehemiah (v.s.) nor the author of pseudo-Solomon b. Isaac on Tamid (v.s.), but rather a different 12th-century French sage. It may have been written by disciples of a certain 12th-century French Saadia (not Saadia b. Joseph); a commentary by "Saadia's disciples" is quoted by Tosafoth Yoma 9a, the quotation matches pseudo-Solomon b. Isaac on 1 Chronicles, and the author of that commentary makes repeated reference to his time learning in Narbonne; though H.J. Matthews doubts the value of this evidence.) Pseudo-Solomon b. Isaac on 1 Chronicles is followed there by Abraham Haym Ofman, the King James Version, Koren, and Artscroll.

=== Nehemiah and 1 Chronicles ===
A few commentators and translations distinguish between the mention in Nehemiah and the mentions in 1 Chronicles. The Vulgate translates vestibulorum, "entrances" (ספפ) in Nehemiah, seniorum concilium, "assembly (אספ) of elders" in 1 Chronicles 26:15, and concilium "assembly (אספ)" in 1 Chronicles 26:17. Pseudo-Solomon b. Isaac on Nehemiah translates the mention there thresholds (ספפ) and pseudo-Solomon b. Isaac on 1 Chronicles translates the mentions there "a place whose name is Asuppim." Pseudo-Solomon b. Isaac on Nehemiah and pseudo-Solomon b. Isaac on Chronicles were written by different people but the King James Version and Artscroll follow the local commentary attributed to Solomon b. Isaac in each case. Robert Alter translates "thresholds" (ספפ) in Nehemiah and "storehouse" (אספ) in 1 Chronicles, as does George Grove. The New Heart English Bible translates "storehouses" (אספ) in Nehemiah 12:25 and "vestibules" (ספפ) in 1 Chronicles 26:15-17, presumably by accident. Distinguishing the two mentions in translation does not imply two distinct locations, as 2 Kings 22:4 describes, "The silver brought to the House of Yahweh, which the threshold (ספפ) guards gathered (אספ)". (Note: Hebrew: הַכֶּ֔סֶף הַמּוּבָ֖א בֵּ֣ית יְהוָ֑ה אֲשֶׁ֥ר אָסְפ֛וּ שֹׁמְרֵ֥י הַסַּ֖ף) The vast majority of scholars agree the mentions in Nehemiah and 1 Chronicles intend the same referent.

=== Modern consensus ===
Most modern translations follow the plain etymology (אספ gather) for "storehouses." Exceptions include: JPS 1985 (which uses ספפ terminate for "vestibules"), Robert Alter's translation (which uses ספפ in Nehemiah 12:25 for "thresholds"), Artscroll (which uses ספפ in Nehemiah 12:25 for "gateposts" and treats it as a proper noun in 1 Chronicles 26:15-17), Koren (which treats it as a proper noun in 1 Chronicles 26:15-17), and the New Heart English Bible (which uses ספפ in 1 Chronicles 26:15-17 for "vestibules"). Most dictionaries do the same, with the exception of Smith's Bible Dictionary (which uses ספפ in Nehemiah 12:25 for "thresholds"). Most modern scholars accepted אספ gather for "storehouses" (see § Proposal of אספ), with exceptions (see § Proposal of סספ and § As a proper noun), though recent research suggests Asuppim is related to Akkadian asuppu and means "insubstantial structures" (see § Akkadian loanword).

== Guards at the Asuppim ==
Levite guards were stationed at the Asuppim. In Nehemiah, the guards of the Asuppim are given as follows: Mattaniah, Bakbukiah, Obadiah, Meshullam, Talmon, and Akkub. In 1 Chronicles, the guarding of the Asuppim is given to "the sons of Obed-Edom" who guard it "two by two (שנים שנים)".

Some Rabbinic commentators explain that the Temple was only guarded by Levites at night, and that it was an honor guard. Others explain that it was guarded by day as well.

=== Number of guards ===
The Talmud (b. Tamid 27a) discusses the number of guards stationed at the Asuppim. The Mishnah (m. Middot 1:1) had described 21 Levite guard stations at the Temple; this apparently conflicts with 1 Chronicles 26, which lists 20 guards in addition to those "at the Asuppim, two by two (שנים שנים)," a total of 24. (Note: This is reduced to 23 by a separate argument) Abaye resolves the issue by interpreting שנים שנים as a repetition not to be summed: "At the Asuppim, two, two". (Note: Vilna and post-Vilna printings erroneously read אמר אביי ה"ק לאסופים שנים Said Abaye, This is what it means: at the Asuppim, two. This is due to confusion over an emendation in the Venice printing, which read 'אמר אביי ה"ק לאסופים שנים ב instead of MSS אמר אביי ה"ק לאסופים שנים שנים; Vilna removed the 'ב without adding back the second שנים.) Pseudo-Asher b. Jehiel understood Abaye's cryptic statement to imply shifts of two, which explanation was accepted by Isidore Epstein and Matthias Asp. Pseudo-Abraham b. David and the Anonymous German Commentary to b. Tamid understood Abaye to imply one guard at each of two Asuppim, which explanation was accepted by David Altschuler and David Qimḥi. Pseudo-Solomon b. Isaac on b. Tamid understood Abaye to imply a repetition for emphasis, which explanation was accepted by Adin Steinsaltz, Koren, Yaakov Shulevitz, and the Encyclopedia Talmudit.

A variety of other commentators reject Abaye and accept the explanation of the Stam, which is that the three places m. Middot 1:1 assigns to Priestly guards are not included among the 21 Levite stations, and when summed they produce the 24 listed in 1 Chronicles. Menachem Meiri, Levi b. Gershon, and Meir Leibush Wisser assume that they are to be summed, and explain that there were two Levites for each Asop. The Peshitta to 1 Chronicles 26:17 has only one "two (ܬܪܝܢ)" (Note: This word in block script: תרי (תְּרֵי). Full verse in Peshitta: ܠܡܕܢܚܐ܂ ܠܘ̈ܝܐ ܫܬܐ ܠܡܕܢܚܐ܂ ܠܝܘܡ̈ܐ ܐܪ̈ܒܥܐ܂ ܠܬܝܡܢܐ ܝܘܡ̈ܐ ܐܪ̈ܒܥܐ܂ ܘܠܒܝܬ ܣ̈ܦܐ ܬܪܝܢ) and LXX has only one "two (δύο)". (Note: Greek: πρὸς ἀνατολὰς ἕξ τὴν ἡμέραν, βορρᾶ τῆς ἡμέρας τέσσαρες, νότον τῆς ἡμέρας τέσσαρες, καὶ εἰς τὸν ἐσεφὶν δύο. Translation: Eastward [were] six [watchmen] in the day; northward four by the day; southward four by the day; and two at the Esephim.) The Vulgate to 1 Chronicles 26:17 has bini et bini, "two and two", which Tremellius shortens to a single bini, "two". Most modern translations of 1 Chronicles 26:17 assume the twos are to be summed, but the New International Version follows pseudo-Asher b. Jehiel's explanation of Abaye.

Guards were not usually stationed individually in the Temple, because it was considered torturous. However, according to the interpretation of Abaye advanced by pseudo-Abraham b. David and the Anonymous German Commentary to b. Tamid (and accepted by David Qimḥi and David Altschuler), the Asuppim guards were each alone; this was permitted either because the Asuppim were close together or because they were located along a public thoroughfare.

== Location ==
It is clear from MT Nehemiah 12:25 אֲסֻפֵּי הַשְּׁעָרִים Asuppim of the gates that, irrespective of the word's etymology, the Asuppim lay at the gates to the Temple. David Qimḥi, pseudo-Abraham b. David, David Altschuler, and Alexander Bennett M'Grigor assume they were to the south of the Temple based on the context in 1 Chronicles 26, where "The south [gate fell to] Obed-Edom, and the Assupim to his sons" and "for the South, four daily; and for the Asuppim, two by two".

John Lightfoot argues the Asuppim was instead located along the western wall of the Temple, based on the fact that only two gates are named in 1 Chronicles 26, Shallecheth and Parbar, and the Asuppim must be at the most important gates, and these gates are along the western wall. However, פַּרְבָּר parbar, which was left as "Parbar" in the King James Version, was never treated as a proper noun by Rabbinic commentaries, who relied on the opinion of Abbah b. Shela that it is a contraction of כלפי בר k'lapei bar "toward the outside," nor by the VSS, the Targum to 1 Chronicles also having כלפי ברא k'lapei bara "toward the outside" and the Vulgate having cellulis "cells" (though the Peshitta transliterates ܦܪܒܪ), and is no longer seen as a proper noun by most scholars, who instead translate it "colonnade" based on the Persian parallel فَرْوَار farwār.
