= Tiberian Hebrew =

Canonical pronunciation of the Hebrew Bible

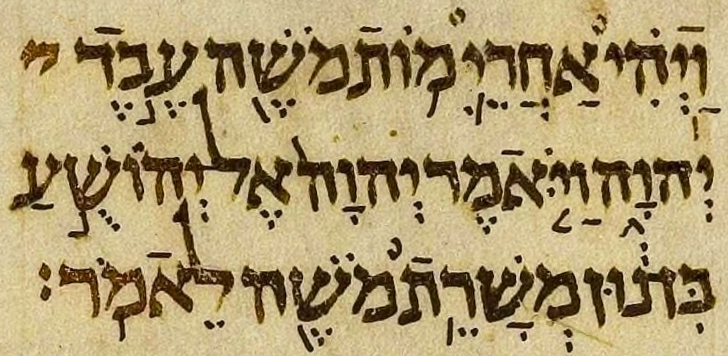
Closeup of Aleppo Codex, Joshua 1:1

Tiberian Hebrew is the canonical pronunciation of the Hebrew Bible (Tanakh) committed to writing by Masoretic scholars living in the Jewish community of Tiberias in ancient Galilee c. 750–950 AD under the Abbasid Caliphate. They wrote in the form of Tiberian vocalization, which employed diacritics added to the Hebrew letters: vowel signs and consonant diacritics (nequdot) and the so-called accents (two related systems of cantillation signs or te'amim). These together with the marginal notes masora magna and masora parva make up the Tiberian apparatus.

Although the written vowels and accents came into use in around 750 CE, the oral tradition that they reflect is many centuries older, with ancient roots.

== Sources ==
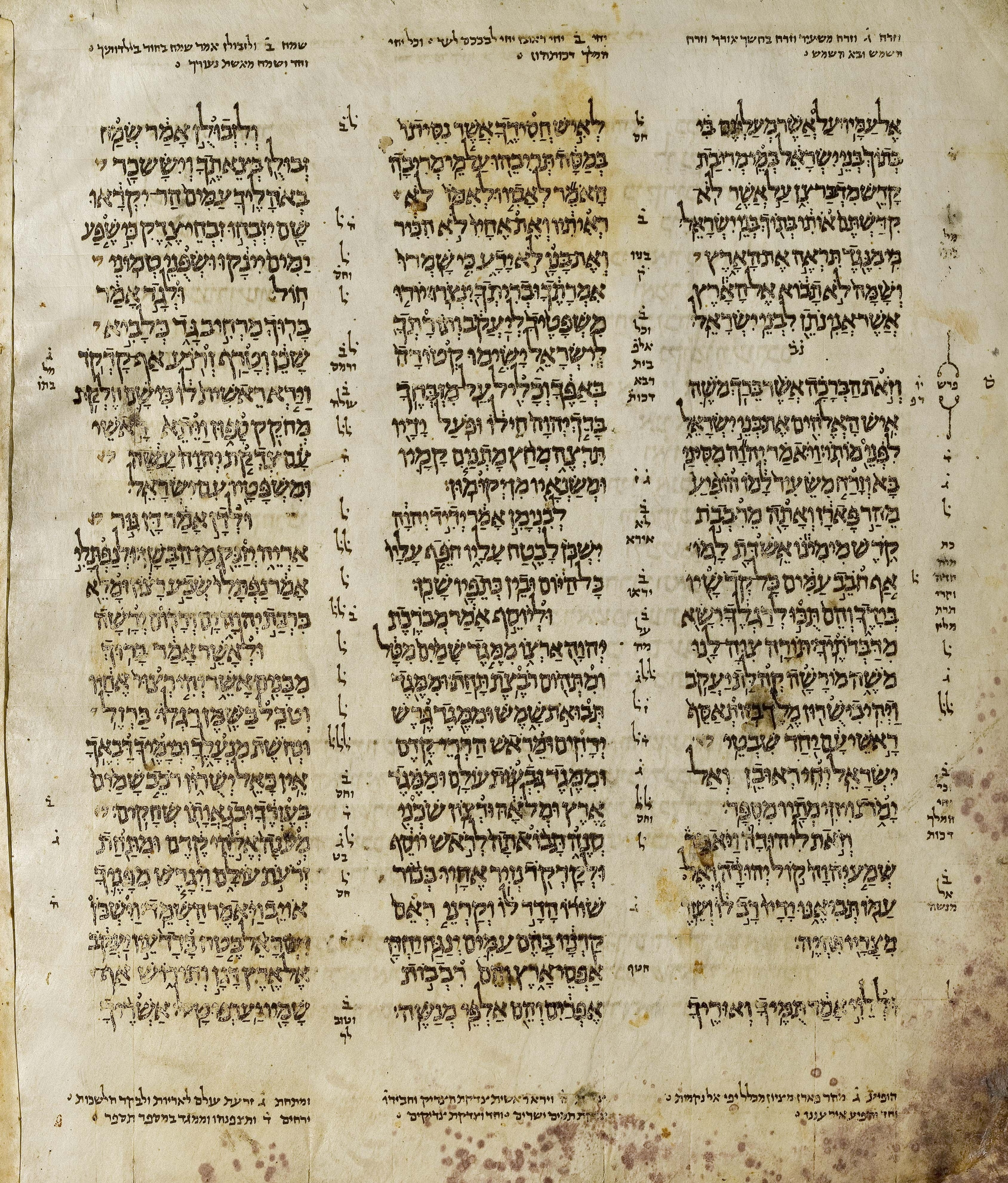
Page from Aleppo Codex, Deuteronomy

Today's Hebrew grammar books do not teach the Tiberian Hebrew that was described by the early grammarians. The prevailing view is that of David Qimḥi's system of dividing the graphic signs into "short" and "long" vowels. The values assigned to the Tiberian vowel signs reveals a Sephardi tradition of pronunciation (the dual quality of qameṣ (אָ) as /a/, /o/; the pronunciation of simple shva (אְ) as /ɛ̆/).

The phonology of Tiberian Hebrew can be gleaned from the collation of various sources:

- The Aleppo Codex of the Hebrew Bible and ancient manuscripts of the Tanakh cited in the margins of early codices, all of which preserve direct evidence in a graphic manner of the application of vocalization rules such as the widespread use of reduced vowels where one would expect simple shva, thus clarifying the color of the vowel pronounced under certain circumstances. Most striking is the use of reduced ḥireq in five words under a consonant that follows a guttural vocalized with regular ḥireq (as described by Israel Yeivin) as well as the anomalous use of the rafe over letters that do not belong to בגדכפ"ת or א"ה.
- The explicit statements found in grammars of the 10th and the 11th centuries, including the Sēfer haq-Qoloṯ ספר הקולות of Moshe ben Asher (published by N. Allony); the Sēfer Diqduqē haṭ-Ṭe'amim (ספר דקדוקי הטעמים Grammar or Analysis of the Accents) of Aaron ben Moses ben Asher; the anonymous works entitled Horayaṯ haq-Qorē הורית הקורא (G. Khan and Ilan Eldar attribute it to the Karaite Jew Aaron of Jerusalem); the Treatise on the Schwa (published by Kurt Levy from a genizah fragment in 1936), and Ma'mar haš-Šəwā מאמר השוא (published from Genizah material by Allony); the works of medieval Sephardi grammarians, including Abraham ibn Ezra and Judah ben David Hayyuj. In the case of the latter two, it is evident that the chain of transmission is breaking down or that their interpretations are influenced by local tradition.
- Ancient manuscripts that preserve similar dialects of Hebrew or Jewish Palestinian Aramaic vocalized with Tiberian niqqud that reveal a phonetic spelling rather than a phonemic spelling. They include the so-called "pseudo-Ben Naphtali" or "Palestinian-Sephardi" vocalized manuscripts, which generally conform to the rules enumerated below, such as pronouncing sheva as /ĭ/ before consonantal yod, as in /bĭji/ בְּיִ.
- Other traditions include Palestinian vocalization and (to a lesser extent) Babylonian (Mesopotamian) vocalization. Each community (Palestinian, Tiberian, Babylonian) developed systems of notation for pronunciation in each dialect, some of which are common among the traditions.
- Karaite transcriptions of Biblical text using the Arabic alphabet but vocalized with Tiberian signs, especially important for syllable structure and vowel length, which is marked in Arabic by matres lectionis and the sign sukun.
- Various oral traditions, especially Karaite and Yemenite Hebrew, have both preserved old features that correspond to Tiberian tradition, such as the pronunciation of schwa according to its proximity to gutturals or yod.

== Phonology ==
=== Consonants ===
Tiberian Hebrew had at least 23 consonantal phonemes, represented by 22 letters. The sin dot distinguishes between the two values of ש, with a dot on the left (שׂ) being pronounced the same as the letter Samekh. The letters בגדכפת (begadkefat) had two values each: plosive and fricative.

Tiberian Hebrew consonants
		Labial	Dental	Denti-alveolar		Palatal	Velar	Uvular	Pharyngeal	Glottal
		Labial	Dental	plain	emphatic	Palatal	Velar	Uvular	Pharyngeal	Glottal
Nasal		m		n						
Stop	voiceless	pʰ		tʰ	tˤ		kʰ	q		ʔ
Stop	voiced	b		d			g			
Fricative	voiceless	f	θ	s	sˤ	ʃ		χ	ħ	h
Fricative	voiced	v	ð	z				ʁ	ʕ	
Trill				ʀ̟						
Approximant				l		j				

The following are the most salient characteristics of the Tiberian Hebrew consonantal pronunciation:

- Before the labial vowels (בומ״ף) and shva (אְ), the waw-conjunctive (ו) was read as וֻ /wu/ (as is the case in some eastern reading traditions.
- The threefold pronunciation of resh ר. Even though there is no agreement as to how it was pronounced, the rules of distribution of such pronunciation is given in הורית הקורא Horayaṯ haq-Qorē:
  1. "Normal" Resh pronounced thus as a uvular sound [ʀ̟~ʁ] (according to Eldar) in all other instances (except for the circumstances described below): אוֹר [ʔoʀ̟]
  2. The "peculiar" resh [rˤ] before or after Lamed or Nun, any of the three being vocalized with simple sheva and resh after zayin ז, daleth ד, samekh ס, sin שׂ, taw ת, ṣade צ, ṭeth ט, any of them punctuated with simple sheva: יִשְׂרָאֵל [jisrˤɔˈʔel], עָרְלָה [ʕɔrˤˈlɔ]. Because of the proximity of a dental consonant, resh was pronounced as an alveolar trill, as it still is in Sephardi Hebrew.
  3. There is still another pronunciation, affected by the addition of a dagesh in the Resh in certain words in the Bible, which indicates it was doubled [ʀː~ʁː]: הַרְּאִיתֶם [haʀːĭʔiˈθɛm]. As can be seen, this pronunciation has to do with the progressive increase in length of this consonant (הָרְאִיתֶם). It was preserved only by the population of Ma'azya (מעזיה), which is in Tiberias.
- A possible threefold pronunciation of taw ת. There are three words in the Torah, Prophets, and Writings in which it is said that "the Taw is pronounced harder than usual". It is said that this pronunciation was halfway between the soft (/θ/) and the hard taw (/t/): וַיְשִׂימֶהָ תֵּל [wajsiˈmɛhɔ‿θ‿tel]

=== Vowels ===
This vowel chart gives a general idea of the vowel space of Tiberian Hebrew. It is not meant to be a precise mapping of the tongue positions, which would be impossible to do anyway since there are no native speakers of Tiberian Hebrew.

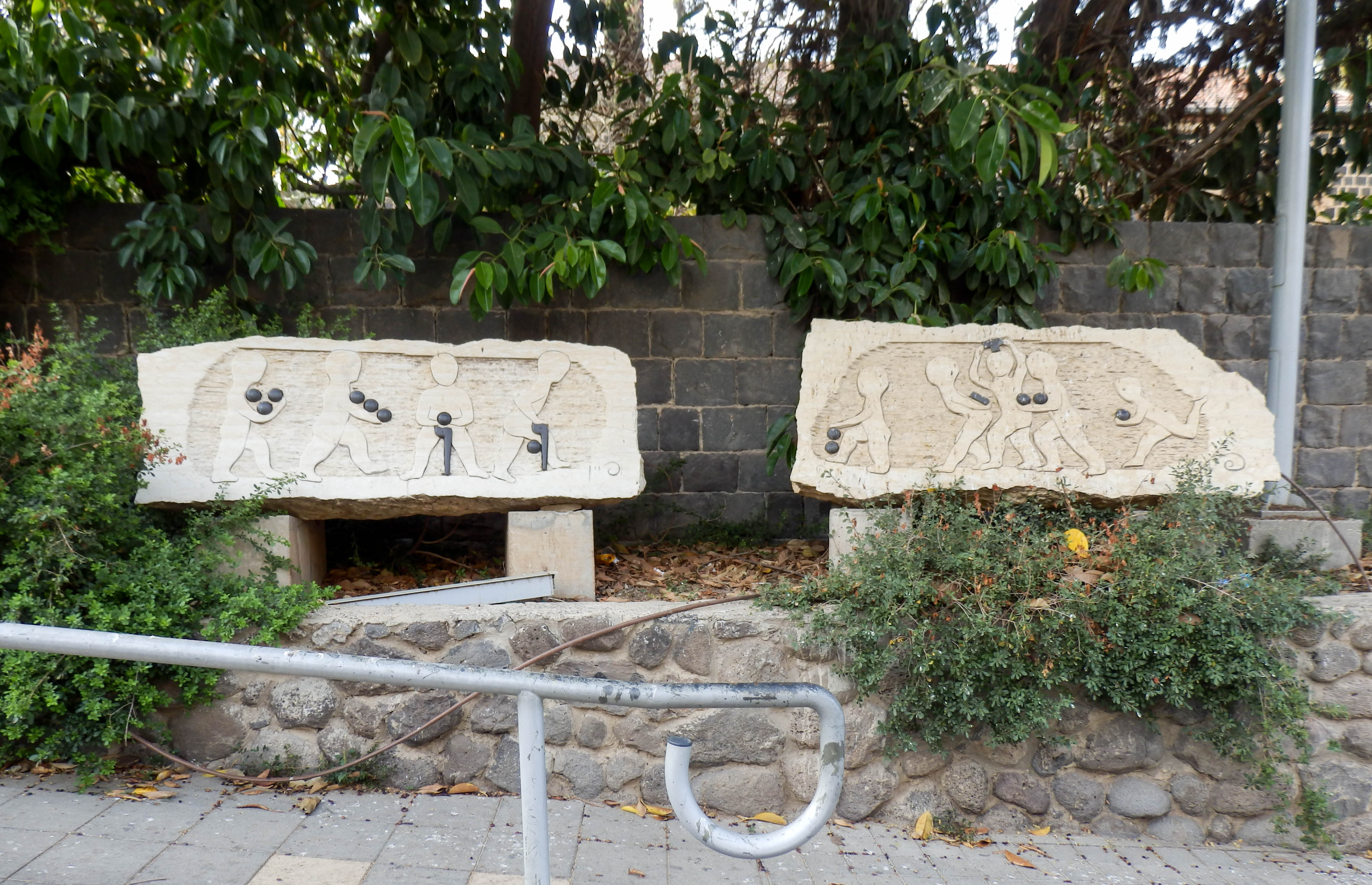
Figurines holding Tiberian vowel diacritics. Limestone and basalt artwork at the shore in Tiberias.

Tiberian Hebrew phonemic vowels
	Front	Back
Close	i	u
Close-mid	e	o
Open-mid	ɛ	ɔ
Open	a	
Reduced	ă ɔ̆ (ɛ̆)^{1}	

1. marginal

The vowel qualities /a e i ɔ o u/ have phonemic status: אָשָׁם הוּא אָשֹׁם אָשַׁם (Lev. 5:19) and אָשֵׁם 'guilty', אִם 'when' and אֵם 'mother'. /ɛ/ has phonemic value in final stressed position רְעֶה רְעִי רָעָה, מִקְנֶה מְקַנֵּה, קָנֶה קָנָה קָנֹה, but in other positions, it may reflect loss of the opposition /a/: /i/. By the Tiberian period, all short vowels in ultimately-stressed syllables had lengthened, making vowel length allophonic. (Note: In fact, all stressed vowels were first lengthened in pause, see Janssens (1982:58–59), as can be seen by forms like Tiberian כַּף /kaf/ < */kaf/, pausal כָּף /kɔf/ < */kɔːf/ < */kaːf/ < */kaf/. The shift in Tiberian Hebrew of */aː/ > */ɔː/ occurred after that lengthening but before the loss of phonemicity of length (since words like ירחם with allophonically long [aː] show no such shift).) Vowels in open or stressed syllables had allophonic length (such as /a/ in יְרַחֵם, which was previously short). (Note: That is attested to by the testimony of Rabbi Joseph Qimḥi (12th century) and by medieval Arabic transcriptions: Janssens (1982:54–56). There is also possible evidence from the cantillation marks' behaviour and Babylonian pataḥ: Blau (2010:82).)

The Tiberian tradition possesses three reduced (ultrashort, hatuf) vowels /ă ɔ̆ ɛ̆/ of which /ɛ̆/ has questionable phonemicity. (Note: See אֳנִי /ʔɔ̆ˈni/ 'ships' אֲנִי /ʔăˈni/ 'I', חֳלִי /ħɔ̆ˈli/ 'sickness' חֲלִי /ħăˈli/ 'ornament', עֲלִי /ʕăˈli/ 'ascend!' (Num 21:17) and בַּעֱלִי /baʕɛ̆ˈli/ '(with the) pestle' (Prov 27:22). Blau (2010:117–118) /ɛ̆/ alternates with /ă/ frequently and rarely contrasts with it: אֱדוֹם /ʔɛ̆ˈðom/ 'Edom' versus אֲדֹמִי /ʔăðoˈmi/ 'Edomite'. Blau (2010:117–118) /ɔ̆/ is clearly phonemic but bears minimal functional load. Sáenz-Badillos (1993:110) /ă/ is written both with mobile šwa ⟨ְ⟩ and hataf patah ⟨ֲ⟩. Blau (2010:117)) /ă/, under a non-guttural letter, was pronounced as an ultrashort copy of the following vowel before a guttural (וּבָקְעָה [uvɔqɔ̆ˈʕɔ]) and as [ĭ] preceding /j/, (תְדַמְּיוּנִי [θăðammĭˈjuni]). However, it was always pronounced as [ă] under gutturals: חֲיִי [ħăˈji].

=== Stress ===
Tiberian Hebrew has phonemic stress (בָּנוּ֫ /bɔˈnu/ 'they built' vs. בָּ֫נוּ /ˈbɔnu/ 'in us'). Stress is most commonly ultimate, less commonly penultimate, and rarely antepenultimate stress: הָאֹ֫הֱלָה /hɔˈʔɔhɛ̆lɔ/ 'into the tent'. (Note: It is unclear that a reduced vowel should be considered a whole syllable. For example, a word's stress shifts to a preceding open syllable to avoid it from being adjacent to another stressed syllable skips over ultrashort vowels: עִם־יוֹ֫רְדֵי בוֹר /ʕimˈjorăðe vor/ 'with those who go down into the pit' מְטֹ֫עֲנֵי חָ֫רֶב /măˈtˤoʕăne ˈħɔrɛv/ 'pierced with a sword'. See Blau (2010:143–144))

=== Phonotactics ===
As described above, vowel length is dependent on syllable structure. Open syllables must take long or ultrashort vowels; stressed closed syllables take long vowels; unstressed closed syllables take short vowels. Traditional Hebrew philology considers ultrashort vowels not to be syllable nuclei.

== Orthography ==
letter	א	ב	ג	ד	ה	ו	ז	ח	ט	י	כ/ך	ל	מ/ם	נ/ן	ס	ע	פ/ף	צ/ץ	ק	ר	ש	ת
transliteration	ʾ	b, ḇ	g, ḡ	d, ḏ	h	w	z	ḥ	ṭ	y	k, ḵ	l	m	n	s	ʿ	p, f	ṣ	q	r	š, ś	t, ṯ
pronunciation (Modern)	[ʔ]	[b] [v]	[ɡ]	[d]	[h]	[v]	[z]	[χ]	[t]	[j]	[k] [χ]	[l]	[m]	[n]	[s]	[ʔ]	[p] [f]	[ts]	[k]	[ʁ]	[ʃ] [s]	[t]
pronunciation (Yemenite)	[ʔ]	[b] [v]	[dʒ] [ɣ]	[d] [ð]	[h]	[w]	[z]	[ħ]	[tˤ]	[j]	[k] [x]	[l]	[m]	[n]	[s]	[ʕ]	[p] [f]	[sˤ]	[g]	[r]	[ʃ] [s]	[t] [θ]
pronunciation (Tiberian)	[ʔ]	[b] [v]	[ɡ] [ʁ]	[d] [ð]	[h]	[v]	[z]	[ħ]	[tˤ]	[j]	[kʰ] [χ]	[l]	[m]	[n]	[s]	[ʕ]	[pʰ] [f]	[sˤ]	[q]	[ʀ̟] [rˁ]	[ʃ] [s]	[tʰ] [θ]
pronunciation (Biblical, before 200 BCE)	[ʔ]	[b]	[ɡ]	[d]	[h]	[w] ~ [ʋ]	[z]	[ħ], [χ]	[tˤ]	[j]	[kʰ]	[l]	[m]	[n]	[s]	[ʕ], [ʁ]	[pʰ]	[sˤ]	[q]	[ɾ]	[ʃ], [ɬ]	[tʰ]
pronunciation (Biblical, after 200 BCE)	[ʔ]	[b] [β]	[ɡ] [ɣ]	[d] [ð]	[h]	[w] ~ [ʋ]	[z]	[ħ]	[tˤ]	[j]	[kʰ] [x]	[l]	[m]	[n]	[s]	[ʕ]	[pʰ] [ɸ]	[sˤ]	[q]	[ɾ]	[ʃ], [s]	[tʰ] [θ]

niqqud with ב	בַ	בֶ	בֵ	בִ	בָ	בֹ	בֻ	בוּ
name	pathaḥ	seghol	ṣere	ḥireq	qamaṣ	ḥolam	qubuṣ	shuruq
pronunciation	/a/	/ɛ/	/e/	/i/	/ɔ/	/o/	/u/	

niqqud with ב	בַא בַה	בֶא בֶה בֶי	בֵא בֵה בֵי	בִי בִא	בָא בָה	בֹא בֹה בוֹ	בוּא בוּה
name	pathaḥ male	seghol male	ṣere male	ḥireq male	qamaṣ male	ḥolam male	shuruq male
pronunciation	/a/	/ɛ/	/e/	/i/	/ɔ/	/o/	/u/

niqqud with א	אְ	אֲ	אֱ	אֳ
name	shwa	ḥaṭaf pathaḥ	ḥaṭaf seghol	ḥaṭaf qamaṣ
pronunciation	/ă/, ⌀	/ă/	/ɛ̆/	/ɔ̆/

niqqud	בּ	בֿ	הּ	שׁ	שׂ
name	daghesh	rafe	mapiq	shin dot	sin dot
pronunciation	Gemination of a consonant /Cː/, or the stop pronunciation of the בגדכפ״ת consonants	Fricative pronunciation of the בגדכפ״ת consonants (its use is optional)	/h/, being the last letter of a word	/ʃ/	/s/

The simple sheva sign changes its pronunciation depending on its position in the word (mobile/vocal or quiescent/zero) and its proximity to certain consonants.

In these examples, it has been preferred to show one in the Bible and represents each phenomenon in a graphic manner (a chateph vowel), but the rules still apply when there is only a simple sheva (depending on the manuscript or edition used).

When the simple sheva appears in any of the following positions, it is regarded as mobile (na):

- At the beginning of a word, which includes the sheva (originally the first of the word) following the attached particles bi-,ki-,li- and u- and preceded by metheg (the vertical line placed to the left of the vowel sign, which stands for either secondary stress or its lengthening). Examples: וּֽזֲהַב /ˌʔuzăˈhav/ Genesis 2:12; בִּֽסֲבָךְ /ˈbisăvɔx/ Psalms 74:5. But is not pronounced if there is no metheg; that is, they form a closed syllable.
- The sheva following these three vowels /e/, /ɔ/, /o/, except for known types of closed syllables (and preceded or not, by metheg). Examples: נֵֽלֲכָה־נָּא /ˌnelăχɔˈnːɔ/ Exodus 3:18; אֵ֣לֲכָה נָּא /ˈʔelăχɔ ˈnːɔ/ Exodus 4:18.
- The second of two adjacent shevas, when both appear under different consonants. Examples: אֶכְתֲּבֶנּוּ /ʔɛxtăˈvɛnːu/ Jeremiah 31:33; וָאֶשְׁקֲלָה־לֹּו /wɔʔɛʃqălɔˈlːo/ Jeremiah 32:9 (except for at the end of a word, אָמַרְתְּ /ʔɔˈmarˤt/).
- The sheva under the first of two identical consonants, preceded by metheg. Examples: בְּחַֽצְצֹן /băˌħasˤăˈsˤon/ Gen. 14:7; צָֽלֲלוּ /sˤɔlăˈlu/ Exodus: 15:10.
- The sheva under a consonant with dagesh forte or lene. Examples: סֻבֳּלוֹ /subɔ̆ˈlo/ Isaiah 9:3; אֶשְׁתֳּלֶנּוּ /ʔɛʃtăˈlɛnːu/ Ezekiel 17:23.
- The sheva under a consonant that expects gemination but is not so marked, for example, the one found under ר. And sometimes even מ when preceded by the article. Examples: מְבָרֲכֶיךָ /măvɔʀ̟ăˈχɛχɔ/ Genesis 12:3; הַמֲדַבְּרִים /hamăðabăˈʀim/ 2 Chronicles 33:18.
- In case a quiescent sheva was followed either by a guttural or yodh, it would turn into mobile according to the rules given below, if preceded by a metheg. Ancient manuscripts support that view. Examples: נִֽבֳהָל /nivɔ̆ˈhɔl/ Proverbs 28:22; שִֽׁבֲעַת /ʃivăˈʕaθ/ Job 1:3.
- Any sheva, if the sign metheg is attached to it, would change an ultrashort vowel to a short, or normal length vowel. For this, only ancient, reliable manuscripts can give us a clear picture, since, with time, later vocalizers added to the number of methegs found in the Bible.

The gutturals (אהח"ע), and yodh (י), affect the pronunciation of the sheva preceding them. The allophones of the phoneme /ă/ follow these two rules:

- It would change its sound to imitate that of the following guttural. וּקֳהָת /ˌʔuqɔ̆ˈhɔθ/ Numbers 3:17; וְנִזְרֳעָה /wănizrˤɔ̆ˈʕɔ/ Numbers 5:28.
- It would be pronounced as ḥireq before consonantal yodh. Examples: יִרְמִיָהוּ /jiʀmĭˈjɔhu/ Jeremiah 21:1; עִנִייָן /ʕinĭˈjɔn/ in Maimonides' autograph in his commentary to the Mishnah. (Note: These two rules, as well as the rule that metheg changes sheva from an ultrashort to a normal vowel, are recorded by Solomon Almoli in his Halichot Sheva (Constantinople 1519), though he states that these differences are dying out and that in most places vocal sheva is pronounced like segol. In Oriental communities such as the Syrians, these rules continued to be recorded by grammarians into the 1900s (such as Sethon, Menasheh, Kelale Diqduq ha-qeriah, Aleppo 1914), but they were not normally reflected in actual pronunciation. The rules about yodh and metheg, though not the rule about gutturals, is still observed by the Spanish and Portuguese Jews of Amsterdam: Rodrigues Pereira, Martin, 'Hochmat Shelomoh.)

It must be said that even though there are no special signs apart /ɛ̆/, /ă/, /ɔ̆/ to denote the full range of furtive vowels, the remaining four (/u/, /i/, /e/, /o/) are represented by simple sheva (ḥaṭaf ḥiriq (אְִ) in the Aleppo Codex is a scribal oddity and certainly not regular in Hebrew manuscripts with Tiberian vocalization).

All other cases should be treated as zero vowel (quiescent, nah), including the double final sheva (double initial sheva does not exist in this Hebrew dialect), and the sheva in the words שְׁתַּיִם /ˈʃtajim/ and שְׁנַיִם /ˈʃnajim/, read by the Tiberian Masoretes as אֶשְׁתַּיִם /ʔɛʃˈtajim/ and אֶשְׁנַיִם /ʔɛʃˈnajim/ respectively. This last case has similarities with phenomena occurring in the Samaritan pronunciation and the Phoenician language.

Depending on the school of pronunciation (and relying on musical grounds, perhaps), the metheg sign served to change some closed syllables into open ones, and therefore, changing the vowel from short to long, and the quiescent sheva, into a mobile one.

That is referenced specifically by medieval grammarians:

If one argues that the dalet of 'Mordecai' (and other letters in other words) has hatef qames, tell him, 'but this sign is only a device used by some scribes to warn that the consonants should be pronounced fully, and not slurred over'.

— Abu al-Faraj Harun, Hidāyat al-Qāri (Horayat Ha-Qore), quoted in Yeivin (1980:283–284)

The names of the vowel diacritics are iconic and show some variation:

The names of the vowels are mostly taken from the form and action of the mouth in producing the various sounds, as פַּתַ֫ח opening; צֵרֵ֫י a wide parting (of the mouth), (also שֶׁ֫בֶר) breaking, parting (cf. the Arab, kasr); חִ֫ירֶק (also חִרֶק) narrow opening; ח֫וֹלֶם closing, according to others fullness, i.e. of the mouth (also מְלֹא פּוּם fullness of the mouth). קָ֫מֶץ also denotes a slighter, as שׁוּרֶק and קִבּוּץ (also קבוץ פּוּם) a firmer, compression or contraction of the mouth. Segôl (סְגוֹל bunch of grapes) takes its name from its form. So שָׁלֹשׁ נְקֻדּוֹת (three points) is another name for Qibbúṣ. Moreover the names were mostly so formed (but only later), that the sound of each vowel is heard in the first syllable (קָמֶץ for קֹמֶץ, פַּתַח for פֶּתַח, צֵרִי for צְרִי); in order to carry this out consistently some even write Sägôl, Qomeṣ-ḥatûf, Qûbbûṣ.

— Wilhelm Gesenius, Gesenius' Hebrew Grammar, §8d
