= Bertheau =

Bertheau is a surname. Notable people with the surname include:

- Charles Bertheau (1660–1732), French pastor
- Ernst Bertheau (1812–1888), German orientalist and theologian
- Julien Bertheau (1910–1995), French actor
- Margarita Bertheau (1913–1975), Costa Rican painter and cultural promoter
- Kathrine Bertheau, Norwegian bridge player
- Peter Bertheau, Swedish bridge player
- Therese Bertheau (1861–1936), Norwegian mountaineer
