= Judah ibn Balaam =

Judah ibn Balaam (or Bal'am) (Hebrew: יהודה בן שמואל אבן בלעם, romanized: Yehuda ben Shmuel ibn Balaam; Arabic: Abu Zakariyya Yahya ibn Balaam; 1000–1070) was a Jewish rabbi active in al-Andalus during the eleventh century.

== Biographical information ==
The life of Judah ibn Balaam is only known by a poem by Moses ibn Ezra in his Kitab al-Muḍaḍarah. It seems that this poem is itself based on the work of Judah, and not on other sources.

According to Ibn Ezra, "Ibn Bal'am came from a respected family in Toledo, and settled later in Seville. In his old age he devoted himself to the study of halakhah. He possessed a quick comprehension and an excellent memory. His style was direct and terse, so that he could present comprehensive subjects in a few words. His literary work extended especially to compendious treatises, in which he availed himself of the thorough and comprehensive studies of his predecessors, but from which he extracted with care only their most essential and valuable contents. . . . Against his otherwise noble character and sedate nature his irritable temperament stood in marked contrast. Nobody escaped his criticism, which consisted not merely in the pointing out of faulty passages, but in a trenchant and ruthless analysis of their errors."

At the end of his life he devoted himself to the study of kabbalah.

== Works ==
The works of Ibn Balaam are written in Arabic. Some are only known by quotations, by himself or by other authors. Some of the preserved works no longer exist in the original Arabic, but through Hebrew translations.

A contemporary and rival of Moses ibn Gikatilla, he is better known in his time for his works of halakha than for those of biblical exegesis and grammar. According to Ibn Ezra, Judah ibn Balaam thoroughly analyzed the studies of his predecessors, but carefully selected only the most valuable and essential elements.

=== Halacha ===
He wrote two treatises on halacha, Sefer Hatsimud (Book of the Union) and Sefer Hahakhra'a (Book of Decision).

=== Biblical Exegesis ===
He also wrote commentaries on most Tanakh books in Arabic. From Kitab al-Tarjiḥ, exegesis on the Pentateuch, only the comments on the Books of Numbers and Deuteronomy have been preserved. He also wrote the Nuqat al-Miqra, a short biblical commentary, preserved in its quasi-entirety. The commentary on the Book of Isaiah was edited by Joseph Derenbourg and, more recently, translated and edited, along with the comments of other books, by Bar Ilan University. A book called Ta'did Mu'jizat al-Taurat wal-Nubuwwat, which lists the miracles in the Pentateuch and the prophetic books, is only known by a mention of Moshe ibn Ezra.

He adopts an intermediate attitude between that of Saadia Gaon and Abraham ibn Ezra, whom he greatly influenced. He examines the text with grammatical tools, but refuses to draw conclusions if they go against the teachings of the Sages.

=== Hebrew Grammar ===
In his works, Ibn Balaam is strongly influenced by Jonah ibn Janah, to the point of being regarded by some as an imitator of him without any originality. His works include:

- Ta'lif fi al-Mutabiq wal-Mujanis, also called Kitāb al-Tajnīs (in Hebrew, Sefer HaTagnis), on homonyms in the Hebrew Bible. The Arabic original has not been preserved, except for a fragment.
- Kitāb Hurūf al-Ma'ānī (in Hebrew, Otiyyot ha-'Inyanim), on the particles in the Hebrew Bible. Fragments of the Arabic original were included in the annotations to the Kitab al-Uṣul of Yona ibn Jannah, edited by Neubauer.
- Kitāb al-Af'āl al-Mushtaqqah min-al-Asmā' (in Hebrew, Ha-Pe'alim Shehem mi-Gizrat ha-Shemot), on the denominational verbs in the Hebrew Bible. The book was edited by G. Polak, and reissued by B. Goldberg and Adelman.

Isaac ibn Barun also mentions a grammatical treaty, which has since been lost.

=== Other ===
Judah ibn Balaam authored the liturgical poem Bezikhri 'al mishkavi, recited by the Sephardic congregations during the Selihot and during the Days of Awe. He could also be the author of poems bearing Bala'am in acrostic.

A treaty on the rules and accents of the masses, the Hidayat al-Qari (in Hebrew, Horayat ha-Ḳore, Help to the reader), was generally attributed to him. However William Wickes, editor of the Arabic original, put this opinion in doubt. It has since been shown that the book was written by Aaron of Jerusalem, a grammarian earlier than Ibn Balaam by a century.
