= Hartwig Derenbourg =

French Orientalist

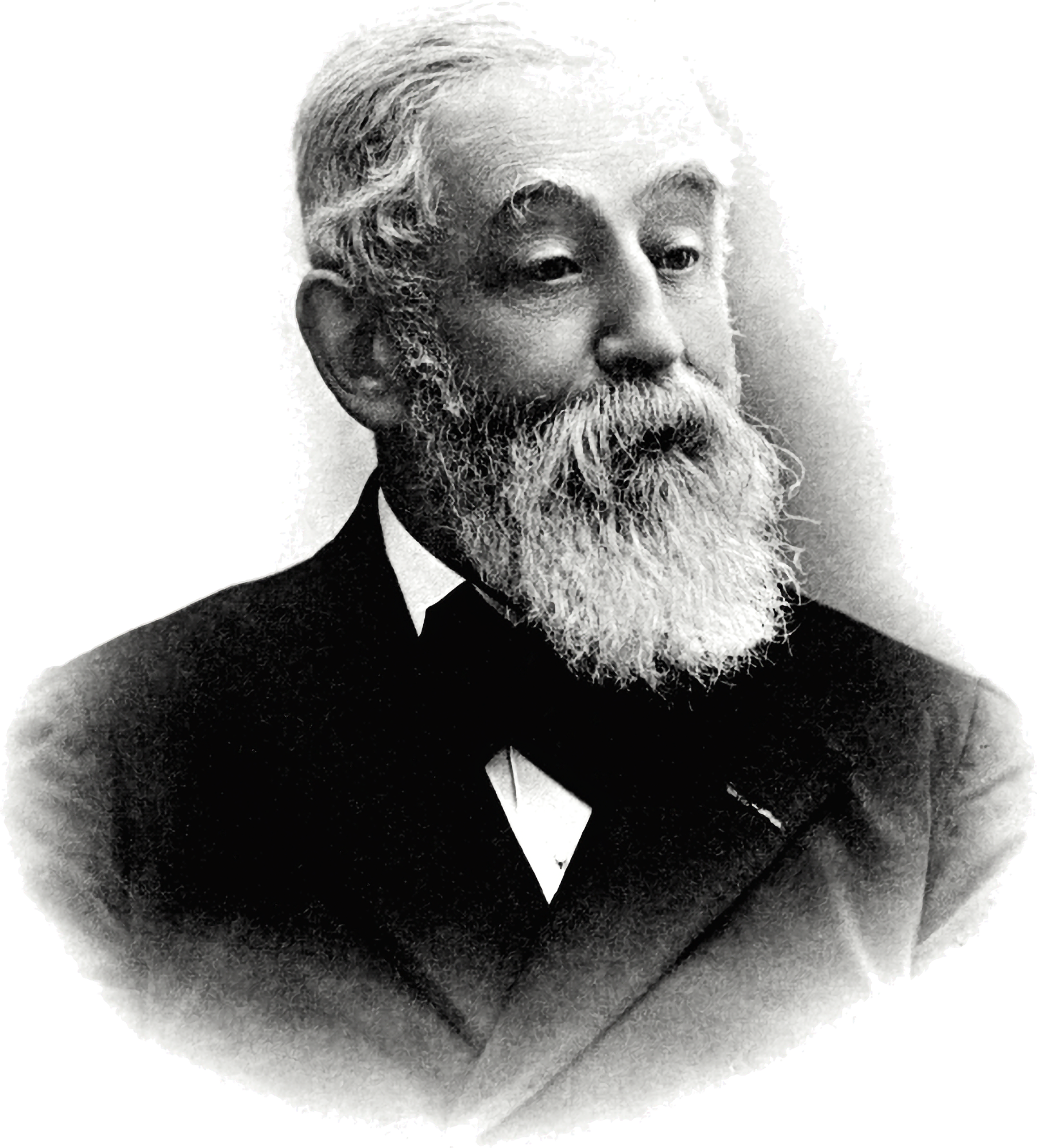
Hartwig Derenbourg

Hartwig Derenbourg (17 June 1844 – 12 April 1908) was a French Orientalist. He held the position of Chair of Islamism and the religions of Arabia in the École des Hautes Études in Paris.

== Biography ==
Derenbourg was born in Paris where he studied Hebrew, Arabic, and other Semitic languages as a pupil of Joseph Toussaint Reinaud, Salomon Ulmann and his father, orientalist Joseph Derenbourg. He furthered his education at Göttingen as a student of Ferdinand Wüstenfeld, Heinrich Ewald and Ernst Bertheau, and at the University of Leipzig under Christoph Krehl and Heinrich Leberecht Fleischer. After receiving his degree, he worked at the Bibliothèque Impériale, where he continued preparation of the catalogue of Arabic manuscripts until 1870. From 1875 he taught classes in Arabic grammar at the École spéciale des langues orientales, attaining the chair of Arabic literature in 1879. In 1885 he was named professor of Islamism and of the religions of Arabia at the École pratique des hautes études in Paris. He died in Paris, aged 64.

== Published works ==
Derenbourg produced a number of important translations of Arabic texts. Among these are the following:

- Oeuvres complètes; French-Hebrew translation from the Arabic version of the Proverbs of Saadia ben Joseph al-Fayyoûmî (882-942) in collaboration with his father Joseph Derenbourg and Mayer Lambert.
- Le dîwân de Nâbiga Dhobyânî; poetry of al-Nābighah al-Dhubyānī (c. 535 - c. 604); (Paris, 1869)
- Histoire Litteraire de l'Ancien Testament (History of the Old Testament by Theodor Noldeke); transl. from German to French by Derenbourg and Soury (1873)
- Le Livre de Sibawaih; the great grammatical treatise known as "Al-Kitāb", or The Book of Sibawayh (c. 760–796); (2 vols., Paris, 1881-1889).
- Les manuscrits arabes de l’Escurial (vol. 1, 1884; vols. 2 and 3, 1903)
- Chrestomathie élémentaire de l'Arabe littéral (in collaboration with Jean Spiro, 1885; 2nd ed., 1892)
- Opuscules et traités d'Abou 'l-Walid Merwan Ibn Djanah de Cordoue, The works of Jonah ibn Janah (c.990-1050) (French, Arabic); Introduction, Kitab al-moustalhik, Risâlat at-tanbih, Risâlat at-takrib wat-tashil and Kitâb at-taswiya. (Paris, ed., Ernest Leroux, 1886)
- La Science des religions et l'islamisme, deux; (Paris, ed., Ernest Leroux, 1886)*Ousama ibn Mounkidh, preface du livre du baton (with trans., 1887)
- Ousama ibn Mounkidh, un emir Syrien au premier siècle des croisades (1095–1188); (Paris, 1889). In 1880 Derenbourg had discovered the only known manuscript of the Kitāb al-i'tibār by the poet-envoy Usāma ibn Munqidh.
- Al-Fakhrî: Histoire du khalifat et du vizirat, depuis leurs origines jusqu'a... by the historian Ibn al-Tiqtaqa (1262-1310); (1895)
- Oumâra du Yémen, sa vie et son œuvre; biography and works of the Yemeni poet ʻUmārah ibn ʻAlī al-Ḥakamī (1121-1174); (Paris, ed., Ernest Leroux, 1897)
