= David Kimhi =

13th-century Spanish rabbi and author (1160–1235)

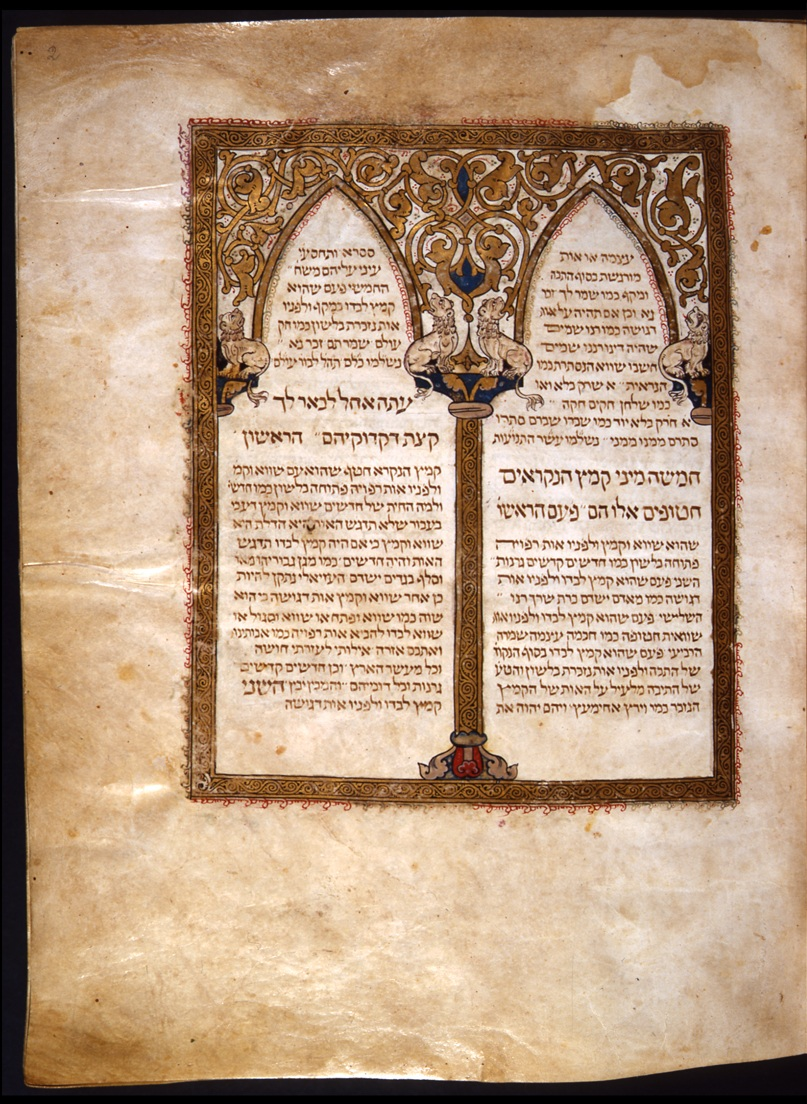
Cervera Bible, David Kimhi's Grammar Treatise

David Kimhi (Hebrew: ר׳ דָּוִד קִמְחִי, also Kimchi or Qimḥi) (1160–1235), also known by the Hebrew acronym as the RaDaK (רַדָּ״ק) (Rabbi David Kimhi), was a medieval rabbi, biblical commentator, philosopher, and grammarian.

== Early life ==
Kimhi was born in Narbonne, a city in Provence, Occitania, then under the rule of Philip II of France. He was the youngest son of Rabbi Joseph Kimhi and the brother of Moses Kimhi, both also biblical commentators and grammarians.

Kimhi was raised by his older brother Moses following the untimely death of their father. Later, he supported himself by teaching Talmud to the young. He was well versed in the whole range of Hebrew literature, and became the most illustrious representative of his name. Works of the Kimhi family were underwritten by the ibn Yahya family of Lisbon in the Kingdom of Portugal.

== Rabbinic career and scholarship ==
Kimhi saw himself primarily as a compiler and summarizer. As a noted Hebrew grammarian, his book Mikhlol (מכלול) and his dictionary of the Hebrew language called Sefer HaShorashim (ספר השורשים, "Book of Roots") draws heavily on the earlier works of Judah ben David Hayyuj and Jonah ibn Janah, as well as from the work of his father. These two books were originally written as one, although over the years they have come to be printed separately. This book, while based on his predecessors, shows a significant amount of innovation, stakes out new territory in his scholarly fields, and from a methodological point of view is superior to what came before. For example, in the Mikhlol, Kimhi expounds on his predecessors' opinions in a clear, straightforward way with a comprehensive approach to the Hebrew structure. Sefer Hashorashim highlights his talent as a writer because of its logical organization, particularly the way he bases his definitions upon etymology and comparisons between languages. Another of Kimhi's works, "'Eṭ Sofer," (עט סופר) was a sort of abridged version of Mikhlol and acted as a manual for Biblical scribes. This was a necessary compilation of rules for the writing of Bible-rolls, Masoretic notes, and accents, due to widespread ignorance among the scribes of the 12th century.

Kimhi also delved into philosophy and the sciences, and was very much influenced by both Abraham ibn Ezra and Maimonides. In later life, he took part in the controversy surrounding the works of Maimonides and staunchly defended him. He even sent letters to other rabbis in order to gain their support. His stance on philosophy was moderate and therefore permitted its study to those whose belief in God and fear of heaven was firm.

Kimḥi also participated in public debates with Christians. According to Kimḥi, Christian interpretation demonstrated a corruption of the text and in some cases was inapplicable and irrational. He mostly attacks the allegorical method of interpretation and Christian claims towards the "true Israel" by stressing the superior morality and religiosity of the Jews. His interpretations were the favourite of the translators of the King James Version.

== Commentaries ==
Kimhi is known primarily for his biblical commentaries on the books of the Prophets. He also wrote commentaries on the books of Genesis, Psalms, and Chronicles. His biblical work mirrors his grammarian work, and focuses on issues of language and form as well as upon content.

He explains words on the basis of their grammatical construction and their etymological development. His commentary also includes homiletic and philosophical material, niqqud (vocalization), rabbinic tradition of the reading, and literal meaning of the words. He also addresses key issues such as the authorship of the various books and the historical eras in which the prophets were active, as well as other historical and geographical questions.

His commentary on Genesis tends toward the philosophical. He seeks out the ethical underpinnings of the stories, believing that they were not included in the text for purely historical reasons, but rather for their moral message.

He makes extensive use of the ancient Targum translation of the text into Jewish Palestinian Aramaic attributed to Jonathan ben Uzziel, commenting on it and bringing variant readings. The commentary also includes a mystical interpretation of the Garden of Eden and the story of Cain and Abel. A similar, mystical interpretation by Kimhi can also be found in his glosses on the final chapter of the Book of Ezekiel, describing the Divine Chariot. When he does not understand a particular text, he follows the example of Rashi and writes, "I did not understand the reason why this story appears in this particular place," or "I did not find a proper reason for it."

His work extensively influenced the "Metzudos" commentary by R. David Altschuler.

== Commemoration and legacy ==
Radak Street in Jerusalem's Rehavia neighborhood is named for him.

== Relevant literature ==
- Grunhaus, Naomi. (Autumn 2003). The commentary of Rabbi David Kimhi on Proverbs: A case of mistaken attribution. Journal of Jewish Studies 54(2): 311-327.
