= Tanhum of Jerusalem =

13th-century Jewish lexicographer

Tanhum ben Joseph Tanhum ha-Yerushalmi
- Born: 1220; Jerusalem
- Died: 27 June 1291 (aged 70–71); Fostat, Mamluk Sultanate (present-day Egypt)

Philosophical work
- Era: Medieval philosophy
- Region: Palestine
- Main interests: Philology, Linguistics
- Notable works: Murshid al-kāfī Kitāb al-Ijāz wal-Bayān

Tanhum ben Joseph of Jerusalem, also known as Tanḥum ha-Yerushalmi (1220–1291), was a 13th-century Hebrew lexicographer and biblical exegete who compiled several Hebrew works, the most notable of which being a lexicon on Mishnaic words entitled Murshid al-kāfī ("The Sufficient Guide"). Tanhum's learning in Jewish studies was so pervasive that he was coined the name "the Abraham ibn Ezra of the Levant."

== Early life ==
Tanḥum ha-Yerushalmi is thought to have been born in Jerusalem and lived for the greater part of his life in the Land of Israel. Towards the latter end of his life, he moved to Cairo, in Egypt, where he lived until his death.

The only information about him is from a eulogy written by his son, the Jerusalem poet Yosef Ben Tanhum. According to this eulogy, R. Tanhum died in the Fustat (now Cairo) in Egypt, on the 21st of Tammuz, 1291. From his writings it can be assumed that he also lived in the Land of Israel, although there is no clear evidence of this. Some suggest that he may have received his epithet "of Jerusalem" from his ancestors, whose origins were from that city.

Tanhum authored two main works: Kitāb al-Bayān ("Book of Elucidation") - A Commentary on the Prophets and Hagiographa, and Al-murshid al-kāfī ("The Sufficient Guide") - A comprehensive and detailed lexicon arranged in alphabetical order in which he defines difficult words found in the Mishnah and in the writings of Maimonides, namely, in his Mishne Torah. All Hebrew words are arranged according to their lexical root. In addition, Tanhum wrote an introduction to his books, entitled Al-Kuliyāt ("General Principles"). In Tanhum's writings there is considerable interest in the natural sciences and worldly wisdom; There is considerable use of professional terms from the fields of medicine and music, as well as a little from astronomy and physics.

Tanhum employed a style of writing in which he frequently makes use of a lyrical Judeo-Arabic, a style very common among Jews in the East. An old copy of his Al-murshid al-kāfī had been preserved in Yemen, and, because of its unique style, was thought by Avraham Al-Naddaf to have been penned in the Yemenite dialect of Arabic. The lexicon had been sent from Egypt to Yemen, unto Rabbi David Hanagid, the son of Rabbi Abraham Maimonides, by the son of the author, R. Yosef ben Tanhum. Only in recent years have Tanhum's works begun to be translated into Hebrew systematically. In places where his books were common, they were widely used, and many authors cite them. The appreciation and trust given to the writings of Tanhum of Jerusalem gave him the title "Ibn Ezra" of the East.

== Rediscovery and publication of Tanhum's works ==
Although studied in Yemen, it was not until the second half of the seventeenth century that Tanhum's writings became known to the western world, when the English orientalist, Edward Pococke (1604–1691), brought several manuscript copies of Tanḥum's writings to Europe from the Near East and published extracts from them in several of his own works, particularly, in his Porta Mosis. In addition, fragments of Tanhum's commentaries have been published in various learned periodicals.

Tanhum combined his commentaries on the Bible in a book called Kitāb al-Bayān ("Book of Elucidation") or sometimes Kitāb al-Ijāz wal-Bayān ("The Book of Simplification and of Elucidation"), which he wrote in Judeo-Arabic. In his commentaries, Tanhum will often explain biblical passages according to the plain and unobtrusive sense of the Hebrew scriptures, but will occasionally bring down biblical exegesis or allegorical interpretations. Despite his simplistic approach, he distances himself from the corporeality of God. His interpretation of the Book of Jonah is a particularly edited and systematic one that explains allegorically the story of Jonah the son of Amittai, in which the human body is compared to the whale, whereas Jonah himself to the human spirit, although doing so with some reservations, as he does not nullify altogether Jonah's prophecy, nor the repentance made by the people of Nineveh. Tanhum raises the suggestion that the Book of Jonah may not have been transmitted to the nation of Israel in its entirety, seeing that it contains a number of "enigmatic episodes."

Today, a handwritten manuscript of his Hebrew lexicon, al-Murshid al-kāfī, is preserved at the Bodleian Library in Oxford University, as well as other Mss. in the Guenzburg library. The first part of the lexicon (up to kāf, the eleventh letter of the Hebrew alphabet) was published in 1961, translated by Rabbi Barukh Avraham Toledano. In 2006, the entire dictionary was republished, based on the 2nd edition of the Murshid and translated into Hebrew by Hadassah Shai of the National Academy of Sciences in Israel.

=== Hebrew grammar ===
Tanhum's works on Hebrew grammar are mainly founded upon the writings of the Spanish grammarian, Jonah ibn Janah. He also draws from Moses ibn Gikatilla. In his commentary on the Hebrew scriptures, Tanhum occasionally divulges the etymological origins of words and compares them with what has been stated about the language in Halacha (sometimes while referring his readers to his own lexicon), as well as to the word's Aramaic and Arabic equivalents. Tanhum explains that the Hebrew and Aramaic are cognate languages, and, where applicable, he tries to find parallels between them.

== Published works ==
- Ad Libros V. T. Commentarii Arabici Specimen una cum Annott. ad Aliquot Loca Libri Judicum (ed. Ch. F. Schnurrer, Tübingen, 1791);
- Commentarii in Prophetas Arabici Specimen, etc. Includes Book of Judges, Books of Samuel, Books of Kings, and Book of Jonah (ed. Theodor Haarbrücker, Halle, 1842–62);
- Commentaire sur le Livre de Habakkouk, Publié en Arabe avec une Traduction Française par Salomon Munk (in Cahen's French Bible, vol. xvii.) Book of Habakkuk (S. Munk, 1843) (OCLC 993876726);
- Commentarii Arabici in Lamentat. (Lamentations) (ed. G. Cureton, London, 1843);
- Arab. ad Libros Samuelis et Regum Locos Graviores, Edidit et Interpretationem Latinam Adjecit Th. Haarbrücker (Leipzig, 1844);
- Book of Joshua, by the same editor (published with the Blätter aus der Veitel-Heine-Ephraim Lehranstalt, Berlin, 1862);
- Book of Judges (extracts), published by Goldziher in his Studien, 1870;
- Book of Ecclesiastes (Commentary on Ḳohelet) (ed. Samuel Eppenstein, Berlin 1888);
- Psalms (idem, 1903).
- Book of Jonah (ed. Kokowzow), in the Rosen-Festschrift, St. Petersburg, 1897;
- Murshid al-kāfī (extracts), published by Wilhelm Bacher under the title Aus dem Wörterbuche Tanchum Jerushalmi's ["From Tanhum Yerushalmi's dictionary"] (Strasburg, 1903) (OCLC 234056592).
- Hadassa Shy, Tanhum Ha-Yerushalmi's Commentary on the Minor Prophets, The Magnes Press: Jerusalem, 1991 (OCLC 1124026990, 233062493)
- Hadassa Shy (ed.), Al-Murshid al-kāfī, The Israel Academy of Sciences and Humanities, 2005
