= Moses ibn Gikatilla =

Jewish grammarian and poet

Moses bar Samuel ha-Kohen ibn Gikatilla was a Jewish grammarian and Bible exegete of the late eleventh century.

== Name ==
His full name was "Moses b. Samuel haKohen," but Abraham ibn Ezra generally called him "Rabbi Moses ha-Kohen." His surname, which appears as early as the tenth century in the writings of a pupil of Menahem ben Saruḳ, Isaac ibn Gikatilla was probably derived from the Spanish Chiquitilla (a diminutive of the Latin caecus "blind"); its Arabic transcription, ibn Gikatilla, is the form usually adopted.

== Biography ==
About Gikatilla's life little is known. His native place was Cordova, but he resided later at Saragossa, where he may have enjoyed personal intercourse with the eminent Hebrew grammarian, Abu al-Walid Merwan ibn Janah. He appears to have lived for some time also in southern France, and there, at the suggestion of Isaac b. Solomon, translated the writings of Ḥayyuj from Arabic into Hebrew. Judah ibn Balaam, his somewhat younger contemporary, says of him: "He was one of the foremost scholars and grammarians and one of the most noted writers, being distinguished for prose and poetry in both Hebrew and Arabic. Physical weakness alone detrimentally affected his position as one of the most eminent men of his time." Judah al-Ḥarizi ("Taḥkemoni," ch. 3) likewise praised his poems, of which, however, not one has been preserved. Gikatilla's importance is in the province of Hebrew grammar and Bible exegesis. Abraham ibn Daud the historian (twelfth century), places him alongside of Abu al-Walid as successor to Ḥayyuj in this province, and Abraham ibn Ezra terms him the "greatest grammarian."

== Works ==
Gikatilla wrote a monograph on Hebrew grammar, which, however, has been lost; it was entitled Kitab al Tadhkir wal-Ta'nith (in Hebrew Sefer Zekarim u-Neḳebot, i.e., Book of Masculines and Feminines). He translated into Hebrew the two principal works of Ḥayyuj, the treatises on "Verbs Containing Weak Letters" and "Verbs Containing Double Letters" (edited from Bodleian MSS., with an English translation by John W. Nutt, 1870).

Numerous citations are found, especially in Abraham ibn Ezra, from Gikatilla's commentaries on Isaiah, the Minor Prophets and the Psalms. Gikatilla is the first Jewish exegete who gave a purely historical explanation of the prophetical chapters of Isaiah and of the utterances of the other prophets. He refers the prophecies in the first part of Isaiah to the time of King Hezekiah and to the Assyrian period, and those in the second part to the time of the Second Temple. According to him, Joel 3:1 does not refer to the Messianic time, but to the numerous prophets' disciples contemporary with Elijah and Elisha. He also assumes the existence of exilic psalms, recognizing as such Psalms 42, 137, and others, and considering the last two verses of Psalm 51 an addition made to a Psalm of David by a pious exile in Babylon. In the course of a disputation which he once held with Judah ibn Balaam concerning Joshua 10:12, Gikatilla rationalizes the so-called miracle of the Sun and Moon by maintaining that after sunset the reflection of the Sun lingered so long that daylight remained while Joshua pursued the enemy; and Judah ibn Balaam remarks in his account of the disputation that this opinion was one of Gikatilla's many misleading and pernicious notions.

In addition to the commentaries above mentioned on the three books of the Bible (Isaiah, the Minor Prophets, and the Psalms), Gikatilla wrote a commentary on Job. In a manuscript at Oxford there exists a considerable portion of this commentary, its introduction and a large part of the Arabic translation of the text, to which the commentary is attached (Neubauer, "Cat. Bodl. Hebr. MSS." No. 125). He seems also to have written a commentary on the Pentateuch, from which Abraham ibn Ezra and Aaron ben Joseph (a Karaite author of the thirteenth century) quoted freely; a commentary to the earlier prophets, some points of which Judah ibn Balaam controverted; and perhaps also a commentary to the Song of Songs, which, as Joseph ibn 'Aḳnin says, Gikatilla explained according to the method of "peshaṭ," that is, in the simplest literal sense. The fragments of Gikatilla's writings, existing for the most part as quotations by Abraham ibn Ezra, were collected by Samuel Poznanski in his monograph, "Moses b. Samuel ha-Kohen ibn Chiquitilla, Nebst den Fragmenten Seiner Schriften," Leipsic, 1895.
