= Benjamin ben Judah =

14th-century Biblical exegete

Benjamin ben Judah of Rome (c. 1290-1335), a member of the prominent Bozecco family, was a Biblical exegete, grammarian, and philosopher. He was the disciple of Joab ben Benjamin ben Solomon. Although his activity lay in the fields of exegesis and grammar, Dov Yarden argues that the poet Immanuel of Rome represents him as an accomplished scientist and philosopher.

== Works ==
- A commentary on Chronicles and Proverbs, still extant in manuscript (Codex de Rossi, 308^{1}, 691, 728^{3}; Paris, 214^{3}; Oxford, 221^{2}, 364^{1}, 714^{3}), in which he endeavors to avoid all haggadic explanations, condemning them and adhering to the literal interpretation based upon grammar and lexicography (he frequently quotes Ibn Ganaḥ, Ibn Ezra, and Ḳimḥi, who served him as models). Heinrich Berger published the commentary to Proverbs, based on the Munich manuscript, in Pressburg, 1901 (on Otzar).
- A commentary on Kings which is preserved starting 1 Kings 7:15 (Codex Angelica 1, Parma 2728 f. 37-50).
- Glosses to the greater part of the Bible (compare Berliner, in "Hebr. Bibl." 14:69).
- Mavo Qaẓar le-Torat ha-Higgui, an introduction to Hebrew pronunciation which was published as an introduction to Moses Ḳimḥi's Sefer ha-Dikdukim.
- Mavo, a grammatical work first published as an introduction to Moses Kimhi's Mahalakh (found 140 years earlier in manuscript as an introduction to Abraham ibn Ezra's Tzachot and Moz'nayim) enjoyed great success and was often reprinted. A commentary on the same work was not attributed, leading to the misimpression that it was also written by Benjamin b. Judah until it was claimed by Elia Levita, who, not knowing the true origin of the introduction, accused Benjamin b. Judah (dead 170 years) of having stolen the commentary for profit.
- Mavo haDikduk, a revised version and extensive summation of the former book, published by S. Loewinger in 1931.
- Heinrich Berger attributed a commentary on Ezra–Nehemiah to him in 1895, but this attribution had already been disproven by H. J. Matthews in 1882.
- Various piyyutim.
- H.J. Matthews suggests that comments to Nevi'im and Ketuvim in the name of זא"ב are to be attributed to Benjamin b. Judah or one of his students. These comments are in his efficient, grammatical style and skip over the sections (Chronicles, Proverbs, 1 Kings 1:1-7:14) on which b. Judah has known commentaries.
