= Joseph Kimhi =

12th-century French rabbi (1105–1170)

Joseph Kimhi, Qimḥi, or Kimchi (1105–1170) (Hebrew: יוסף קמחי) was a medieval Jewish rabbi and biblical commentator. He was the father of Moses and David Kimhi, and the teacher of Rabbi Menachem Ben Simeon and poet Joseph Zabara.

Grammarian, exegete, poet, and translator; born in southern Spain about 1105; died about 1170. Forced to leave his native country owing to the religious persecutions of the Almohades, who invaded the Iberian Peninsula in 1146, he settled in Narbonne, Provence, where he spent the rest of his life. The Hachmei Provence were under the considerable influence of the neighboring Spanish Jewish community to the south at the time.

Kimhi is known to have written commentaries on all the books of the Bible, though only fragments of his work have survived until today. The foundation of his work is a literal reading of the Masoretic Text ("𝕸") and its grammatical analysis, interspersed with contemporary philosophical musings. This reflects his opposition to a christological reading of the text, which highlights allegory. In fact, Kimhi participated in several public debates with Catholic clergy, in which he highlighted his own method of reading biblical texts. His opposition to the contemporary Christian reading can be found in his Book of the Covenant (Hebrew: ספר הברית).

His son David, though but a child at the time of his father's death, may also be considered one of his pupils, either directly through his works, or indirectly through the instruction David received from his elder brother Moses.

== Relations with Ibn Ezra ==
Abraham ibn Ezra, who in his wanderings visited Narbonne in 1160, may have possibly met Joseph. The latter followed Ibn Ezra in some particulars, e.g., in the use of the stem שמר for the paradigm of the verb. Both scholars worked at the same time and along the same lines to popularize Judeo-Arabic science among the Jews of Christian Europe by excerpting from and translating Arabic works. Although ibn Ezra was Kimhi's superior in knowledge, the latter can rightly claim to have been the first successful transplanter of Judeo-Arabic science in the soil of Christian Europe. His diction is elegant and lucid, the disposition of his material scientific, his treatment of his subject even and without digressions; so that his works are much better adapted for study than those of Ibn Ezra, which lack all these qualifications.

== Relations with Rabbeinu Tam ==
Another famous contemporary of Kimhi was Jacob ibn Meïr, called Rabbeinu Tam, of Ramerupt, who was the greatest Talmudic authority of the day. This scholar, wishing to settle the literary quarrel between the followers of Menahem ben Saruq and of Dunash ben Labraṭ, had written a book of decisions (הכרעות hakhraʻot), in which he took the part of Menahem. These decisions did not satisfy Kimhi. Feeling himself better able than Rabbeinu Tam to pass judgment in the case, he wrote the Sefer ha-Galui in 1165.

This work falls into two parts: the first treats the differences between Menahem and Dunash; the second contains independent criticisms on the former's dictionary. In the introduction, Kimhi apologizes for daring to come forward against so eminent a man as the leading Talmudic authority of his time. Hearing that the ignorant among the people will attack him on that account, he puts into their mouths the words which Abner, the captain of Saul, spoke, when David cried out to the king: "Who art thou that criest to the king?" ('I Sam. 26,14').

His fears were realized; Benjamin of Canterbury, a pupil of Rabbeinu Tam, made observations on the Sefer ha-Galui, defending his teacher. He also called Kimhi in a contemptuous sense HaQore "The Crier" because the latter ventured to cry his contradictions to the "king," i.e., Rabbeinu Tam.

== Grammarian and lexicographer ==
In Kimhi's grammatical works Sefer Zikkaron (edited by Bacher, Berlin, 1888) and Sefer haGalui (edited by Matthews, ib. 1887) he is dependent on Judah ben David Hayyuj for the treatment of his subject, but in his explanations of words he relies mainly on Jonah ibn Janah.

On the whole, he is not original; in minor points, however, he goes his own way, becoming therein the model for future generations. Thus he was the first to recognize that the hif'il has also a reflexive and an intransitive meaning; he was also the first to arrange a list of nominal forms, and to indicate eight verb classes. He was acquainted moreover with Latin grammar, under the influence of which he resorted to the innovation of dividing the Hebrew vowels into a system of five short and five long ones. In his works he pays frequent attention also to the language of the liturgy. In his etymological explanations he seeks for analogies in Bible, Talmud, Targum, and in Arabic. In cases where such analogies are wanting or unsatisfactory he is guided by the principle, "The unknown must be deduced from the known." Not seldom he explains difficult words on the basis of phonetic laws laid down by himself.

== Exegete ==
Of his exegetical works few have been preserved. Mention is made of his Sefer hatTorah, a commentary on the Torah, which introduced into the theory of the verbs a new classification of the stems which was leter retained by later scholars; his Sefer hamMiḳnah, a commentary on the Nevi'im; and his Ḥibbur halLeḳeṭ of unknown contents. A commentary by him on the Song of Songs exists in manuscript; his commentary on the Book of Proverbs has been published by Dob Bär ans Dubrowo under the title Sefer Ḥuqqah (Breslau, 1868); and variants to the badly printed text are given by Simon Eppenstein in Zeit. für Hebr. Bibl. v. 143 et seq.

In the far more ample Sefer Ha-Galuy, "Book of Demonstration" Kimhi attacked the philological work of the greatest French Talmud scholar of that day, Rabbeinu Tam, who espoused the antiquated system of Menahem ben Saruq, and this he supplemented by an independent critique of Menaḥem. This work is a mine of varied exegetical and philological details.

A fragment of his commentary on the Book of Job was published by Israel Schwarz in his Tiqwat Enosh (Berlin, 1868); the remaining portions, by Simon Eppenstein in Revue des Études Juives xxxvii. 86 et seq. Many exegetical remarks are scattered throughout Kimhi's grammatical works. His method is mostly that of the peshaṭ, i.e., literal interpretation. He frequently follows the Spanish school, without, however, reading into the Scriptural text the scientific knowledge of his own time. He pays a great deal of attention to the context, a point usually neglected by Aggadists. His explanations are short and terse. While criticizing at times some untenable explanations of his predecessors, he accepts such as seem to him to be correct. He is the first eclectic of the Hachmei Provence. In his commentaries he also made contributions to the comparative philology of Hebrew and Arabic.

== Poet ==
Kimhi tried his hand also at writing poetry. His liturgical hymns and other poems which have come down are distinguished by beauty of form and elegance of language. He retains importance as one of the Provençal poets. His poems met with consideration at the hands of later generations and were frequently quoted by them. He is the first known author to write poems in the Magen Avot genre, and apparently is the inventor of the genre, which later became popular in Germany.

== Translator ==
He translated Bahya ibn Paquda's ethical work Hobot halLebabot from Arabic into Hebrew, and he turned Solomon ibn Gabirol's Mibḥar hapPeninim into metrical form under the title Sheqel haqQodesh. Of the translation, only a fragment has been preserved, which was published by Jellinek in Benjacob's edition of ibn Tibbon's translation of that work (Leipsic, 1846); the "Sheqel" is still unprinted. In his translation, aiming chiefly at elegance of expression, Ḳimḥi does not keep to the original. He works too independently and, carrying into the work his own spirit, he often obscures the thought of the author. Notwithstanding its defects, his translation is not without merit. It has contributed to a better understanding of the Arabic authors, and is, therefore, to be considered in a certain sense as supplementing the works of the Tibbonides.

== Apologete ==
Kimhi's apologetic work Sefer ha-Berit contributed to Jewish polemics and apologetics in the Middle Ages, though it was not printed until a fragment was published in Milḥemet Ḥobah (Constantinople, 1710). This work was written at the request of one of his pupils who wished to have a collection of all the prophetic passages in Scripture that might serve as aids in refuting those persons who denied the Torah. It is in the form of a dialogue between a loyal Jew and an apostate. The loyal Jew claims that the moral conduct of the individual may recognize the true religion of the Jew; all Jews are intent on carrying out in their lives the Ten Commandments; they give no divine honors to anyone besides God; do not perjure themselves; commit no murder; and are not robbers. Their children are educated in the fear of God; their women are chaste; the Jews are hospitable toward one another, perform works of charity, and redeem captives—all virtues which are not found in such a high degree among non-Jews. The apostate admits all these claims but points out that Jews demand high interest on loans. This objection of the loyal Jew meets with the statement that non-Jews also are usurers and that they impose upon members of their faith. At the same time, rich Jews lend money to their coreligionists without any interest whatsoever. The Sefer ha-Berit showed the moral condition of the Jews at that time and bore testimony to the conditions of those days, in which the Jews of Occitania could freely express themselves not only about their religion but also about the religion of their neighbors.

== Jewish Encyclopedia bibliography ==
- Blüth, in Berliner's Magazin, xviii. 1, xix. 89;
- Eppenstein, in Monatsschrift, xl. 173, xli. 83;
- R. E. J. xxxvii. 86;
- Zeit. für Hebr. Bibl. v. 143.G. C. L.
