= Aaron of Jerusalem =

11th century Karaite grammarian who lived in Jerusalem

- אַבּוּ אלְ-פַרַג' הַארוּן אִבְּן אלְ-פַרַג
- Born: Jerusalem
- Other names: Abū al-Faraj Hārūn ibn al-Faraj
- Occupations: Scholar, Grammarian
- Years active: 11th century
- Known for: Mushtamil, Kitab al-Kafi, Sharḥ al-Alfaẓ
- Notable work: Mushtamil (The Comprehensive), Kitab al-Kafi, Sharḥ al-Alfaẓ

Aaron of Jerusalem, also known as Abū al-Faraj Hārūn ibn al-Faraj (Judeo-Arabic אַבּוּ אלְ-פַרַג' הַארוּן אִבְּן אלְ-פַרַג), was a Karaite Jewish scholar of the eleventh century who resided in Jerusalem.

== Grammarian ==
Little was known of Aaron until Adolf Neubauer discovered, among the manuscript collection of Abraham Firkovich in Saint Petersburg, important fragments in Arabic of the Mushtamil "The Comprehensive", a Hebrew grammar consisting of eight books. Bacher, while studying these fragments, succeeded in rediscovering the unknown grammarian. Samuel Abraham Poznański published some valuable specimens of Aaron's work; and, following a suggestion of Abraham Harkavy, he threw new light on the author and some other works of his: namely, the Kitab al-Kafi, a commentary on the Torah, often quoted by Karaite writers, and a lexicographical work bearing the title Sharḥ al-Alfaẓ, a part of which is extant in the British Museum.

He was acknowledged by the Rabbanites as one of the principal representatives of Karaitic learning and as a great authority on grammar and exegesis. He is quoted by Abraham ibn Ezra in the preface to his Moznayim as "the sage of Jerusalem, not known to me by name, who wrote eight books on grammar, as precious as sapphire." Moses ibn Ezra refers to him as "the sage of Jerusalem who wrote the Mushtamil, and also quotes him as "Sheik Abu al-Faraj of Jerusalem, who is no adherent of our religious community." Judah ibn Balaam likewise mentions "the grammarian of the Holy City"; and Jonah ibn Janah in his Riqmah relates that Jacob de Leon brought him from Jerusalem "the copy of a book by an author who lived there, but whose name he refrains from mentioning," because, as Bacher surmises, he was a Karaite.

Abu al-Faraj occasionally cites from the Hebrew-Arabic dictionary compiled by David ben Abraham al-Fasi.
