= Jean Spiro =

Swiss clergyman (1847–1914)

Jean Herszek Spiro (19 February 1847, in Arnhem – 13 April 1914, in Lausanne) was a Swiss clergyman and orientalist.

In 1871 he received his ordination in Neuchâtel, and afterwards served as a pastor in the communities of Trey (1872–76) and Porrentruy (1876–83). From 1883 to 1890 he taught classes in oriental languages at Collège Sadiki in Tunis. In 1891 he returned to Switzerland, where he became a lecturer at the University of Lausanne and served as a pastor in the town of Vufflens-la-Ville. In 1894 he was named an associate professor of Semitic and oriental languages at Lausanne. Among the lessons he taught at the university, were classes on Phoenician and Sabaean epigraphy.

== Selected works ==
- Chrestomathie élémentaire de l'arabe littéral avec un glossaire (with Hartwig Derenbourg, 1895, 3rd edition 1912) – Elementary chrestomathy of literal Arabic with a glossary.
- Origine et formation du régime matrimonial Vaudois, 1896 – Origin and formation of the Vaudois matrimonial regime.
- Étude sur le peuple samaritain, 1897 – Study on the Samaritan people.
- Les Yezidi, ou les Adorateurs du diable, 1900 – The Yezidi, or worshippers of the devil.
- L'histoire de Joseph selon la tradition musulmane, 1906 – The history of Joseph according to Muslim tradition.
