= H. J. Matthews =

19th-century English librarian and scholar of Rabbinics

Henry John Matthews (Hebrew: הינרי יוחנן מאתיוס; 1844 - April 22, 1905), known professionally as H. J. Matthews, was a British librarian and scholar of Rabbinic commentaries to the Hebrew Bible. He is most notable for first publishing the commentary of "Saadia" to the book of Ezra–Nehemiah and for his study of Benjamin ben Judah of Rome.

== Career ==
Matthews attended Exeter College, Oxford. In 1866, he won the Boden Sanskrit Scholarship, and in 1869 he obtained his B.A. In 1870 he was awarded the Pusey and Ellerton Hebrew Scholarship. In 1874 he earned his M.A. and in 1880 he was appointed head librarian of the Bodleian Library locum tenens. He became a member of the Library Sub-Committee in 1882 and became its chairman in 1888, the same year he was examiner of the Kennicott Hebrew Scholarship, and held that position until his death in 1905. During his time at the Brighton library he undertook the whole of its management and cataloging, entirely as a volunteer, something "unique in the history of public libraries". In his lifetime he presented more than 2,000 volumes, and he bequeathed his personal collection of 3,500 15th to 19th century Hebrew and Middle Eastern volumes to the Brighton library in his will. This collection was described by a prominent member of the Brighton Jewish community as the finest collection he knew outside of Israel.

== Personal life ==
Matthews was a shy and reserved bachelor of independent means who devoted his life to his scholarship and to the Brighton and Hove Public Library.

== Works ==
- (1874) Abraham Ibn Ezra's commentary on the Canticles: after the first recension. London: Trübner.
- (1877) "Abraham Ibn Ezra's short commentary on Daniel, with an appendix of two addition MSS. of his commentary to Canticles after the first recension" in Miscellany of Hebrew literature vol. II. p. 263-71 London: Trübner.
- (1878) Binyamin ze'ev yitrof: Notes from various authors on Psalms, Job, the Megilloth (except Ruth) and Ezra. Amsterdam: Levisson.
- (1879) In memoriam: George Long. Brighton.
- (1880) "Miscellaneous Notes" in Israelietische Letterbode vol. VI. pp. 77–80, 186-192.
- (1881) "Notes on the Minor Prophets by זא"ב" in Israelietische Letterbode vol. VII. pp. 32–38, 70-96.
- (1882) Commentary on Ezra and Nehemiah by Rabbi Saadiah. Oxford: Clarendon Press.
- (1883) "Miscellaneous Notes" in Israelietische Letterbode vol. IX. pp. 59–65.
- (1886) Brighton College Register, Part 1, 1847–63, Nos 1-1000, with Brief Biographical Notices. Brighton: J. Farncombe.
- (1887) Sefer ha-galui Yosef b. Yitsḥaḳ ben Ḳimḥi; ʻim hagahot shel ish eḥad shemo Binyamin; hotsiʼam le-or mi-ketav yad yeḥidi. Berlin: H. Itzkowski.
- (1889) "Buxtorf's Manuale Hebraicum et Chaldaicum: Where is the edition of 1602?" in Zentralblatt für Bibliothekswesen vol. VI. pp. 108–110.
- (1896) "An anonymous commentary to Shir haShirim." Festschrift zum achtzigsten geburtstage Moritz Steinschneider's. pp. 238–240 (English), 164-185 (Hebrew side). Leipzig, O. Harrassowitz.
