= Rabbah b. Shela =

Rabbah b. Shela (or Rabbah b. Shila or R. Abba b. Shila or Rabbah son of R. Shila or simply Rabbah) was a Babylonian rabbi of the 4th century (fourth generation of amoraim).

== Biography ==
Rabbah was probably a student of Rav Chisda, to whom he once addressed a halakhic question; he also quotes some of Chisda's halakhic and aggadic teachings. He also transmitted teachings in the name of Rav Nachman, R. Matna, and R. Hamnuna the Elder.

He was a contemporary of Rava, and a judge probably at Pumbedita. His strict honesty is shown by his teaching that a judge may not borrow anything from those who are under his jurisdiction, unless he is in a position to lend something in return, since otherwise he may be bribed by the kindness which has been done to him in the making of the loan.

Several of his interpretations of Biblical passages have been preserved, some being his independent opinions, while others were derived from his predecessors.

It is told that he once met Elijah and asked him: "What is the Holy One, blessed be He, doing?" Elijah answered: "He utters traditions in the name of all the Rabbis, but in the name of Rabbi Meir He does not utter... because he learnt traditions at the mouth of Aher. Rabbah asked, "But why? R. Meir [is like a man who] found a pomegranate; he ate [the fruit] within it, and the peel he threw away!" Elijah answered: "Now He [the Holy One] says: Meir my son says..."
