= Moses Kimhi =

12th century Jewish biblical commentator

Moses Kimhi (c. 1127 – c. 1190), also known as the ReMaK, was a medieval Jewish biblical commentator and grammarian.

== Birth and early life ==
Kimhi was born around 1127, the eldest son of Joseph Kimhi and the brother of David Kimhi, known as the RaDaK. He was born and lived in Provence in Occitania, an area that was heavily under the influence of the Sephardic community of that time. Little else is known of his early life.

== Adulthood ==
He apparently raised his younger brother David following the death of their father, and was a major influence in his commentaries.

== Career as a commentator ==
Like his father, he wrote a number of commentaries on the Bible, basing himself on the literal meaning of the text. His surviving works include commentaries on the books of Proverbs, Job, Ezra, and Nehemiah.

He also wrote a book of essays on Hebrew grammar, known, after the first three words, as Mahalak Shebile Ha-daat, or briefly as Mahalak. In it he described the underlying principles of his commentaries, combined with tangential discussions of medieval philosophy. This handbook was of great historical importance as in the first half of the 16th century it became the favourite manual for the study of Hebrew among non-Judaic scholars.
