= Paul Mankowski =

American Jesuit priest and biblical scholar (1953–2020)

Fr. Paul Vincent Mankowski, SJ
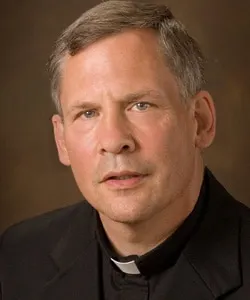
- Born: November 15, 1953; South Bend, Indiana, U.S.
- Died: September 3, 2020 (aged 66); Evanston, Illinois, U.S.
- Education: University of Chicago (A.B.); University of Oxford (M.A.); Weston Jesuit School of Theology (M.Div., S.T.L.); Harvard University (Ph.D.)
- Occupations: Priest, biblical scholar, writer, satirist

Paul Vincent Mankowski, S.J. (November 15, 1953 – September 3, 2020) was an American Catholic priest, biblical scholar, philologist, and essayist. He was a member of the Society of Jesus.

== Early life ==
Paul Vincent Mankowski was born on November 15, 1953, in South Bend, Indiana. He worked in steel mills to finance his education at the University of Chicago, earning an A.B. in Classics and Philosophy in 1976.

== Education and Jesuit formation ==
Mankowski entered the Society of Jesus as a novice on September 5, 1976, in Berkley, Michigan. He earned an M.A. in classics from the University of Oxford in 1983, a Master of Divinity and Licentiate in Sacred Theology from Weston Jesuit School of Theology in 1987, and a Ph.D. in Comparative Semitic Philology from Harvard University in 1997. He was ordained a priest on June 13, 1987, and professed final vows on December 12, 2012, at Loyola University Chicago. During his regency (1979–1984), he studied at Oxford and taught at Xavier University in Cincinnati, Ohio.

== Academic and pastoral career ==
From 1994 to 2009, Mankowski was a professor of Old Testament languages at the Pontifical Biblical Institute in Rome, teaching ancient Semitic languages and advising on liturgical translations. He taught at the University of Chicago's Graham School of General Studies from 2010 to 2011. In 2011, he served as pastor of Sacred Heart Church English Language Parish in Amman, Jordan. From 2012 to 2020, he was Scholar-in-Residence at the Lumen Christi Institute at the University of Chicago, leading courses on theology and classics and catechesis for RCIA programs. He also provided pastoral ministry at parishes and Newman Centers.

== Writings and publications ==
Mankowski wrote essays and reviews on liturgy, biblical studies, and Catholic theology, published in First Things and Catholic World Report under the pseudonym "Diogenes." His works include a 1994 satirical piece, The Tragedy of Macdeth, in The American Spectator. A collection of his essays, Jesuit at Large: Essays and Reviews by Paul V. Mankowski, S.J., was published in 2021 by Ignatius Press.

== Restrictions on publishing ==
In 2007, Mankowski was restricted from publishing under his name by Jesuit superiors after criticizing a fellow Jesuit's political activities. He used the pseudonym "Diogenes" for columns in Catholic World Report. In 2008, further restrictions limited him to speaking only on ancient Semitic languages.

== Death ==
Mankowski died on September 3, 2020, in Evanston, Illinois, from a cerebral hemorrhage caused by a ruptured brain aneurysm.
