= David Altschuler =

Hebrew Bible commentator

Rabbi David Altschuler of Prague (1687-1769) was a biblical commentator and the author of a classic commentary, known as the Metzudos, to the Hebrew Bible's Nevi'im and Ketuvim. Altshchuler is also known as the Baal Metzudot, "Author of the Metzudot."

== Biography ==
Altschuler was born in Yavoriv in western Galicia. His family had its origins in Portugal, but were forced to leave with the expulsion of Jews from Portugal. It is reported that upon reaching Prague they built a synagogue using stones from the old Portuguese synagogues they had left, and therefore the family name became Altschuler ("of the old synagogue"). According to other reports, the family origin was in Provence.

In the year 5486 (1725-1726) he is recorded as serving as a rabbi or judge of Yavoriv. Apparently, after this he served as rabbi of Prague, as did other members of his family.

== Works ==
R. Altschuler saw that the study of Tanakh, Hebrew Bible, had become weak among European Jews and even among scholars. Believing that the reason for this was the lack of a sufficiently simple and clear commentary, he wrote his commentary "Metzudat David" to fit this need. The commentary covers all Neviim and Ketuvim except for Ruth, Lamentations, and Esther. It is principally based on the commentary of Radak, but includes ideas from many other previous commentators. According to the Hida, these sources include Rashi, Ibn Ezra, Ralbag, Moshe Alshich, Saadiah Gaon and Ramban. The commentary was published in Zhovkva in 1753, and later published a second time before his death.

David's son Yechiel Hillel Altschuler also served as rabbi of Yavoriv, and finished his father's great work, and traveled extensively in Europe in order to publish and spread it. David published the commentary as one work, but Yechiel divided it into two works: Metzudat David which explains the meaning of the verses, and Metzudat Tzion which explains individual words and phrases. The two works are collectively known as the Metzudot.

In time the Metzudot became one of the basic commentaries on Neviim and Ketuvim, printed in most editions of the Hebrew Bible with commentators. See Yeshiva § Torah and Bible study.
