= Charles Bertheau =

French pastor in London (1660–1732)

Charles Bertheau (1660–1732) was a French pastor in London, was born at Montpelier, and educated partly in France and partly in Holland. He was admitted to the ministry at the synod held at Vigan in 1681, and shortly afterwards became one of the pastors of the then important church of Charenton, Paris. The revocation of the Edict of Nantes drove him out of France, and he came to England in 1685. In the following year he was chosen one of the pastors of the French church in Threadneedle Street, London, a post which he occupied for forty-four years.

He is said to have been remarkable for his memory and eloquence. Two volumes of his sermons were printed in Holland in 1712 and 1730. An obituary notice in vol. i. of the Bibliotheque Britannique, published at The Hague in 1733, is the main authority for the facts of Bertheau's life, and has been copied, or abridged, by subsequent biographers. The article in Jacques Georges de Chaufepie's Nouveau dictionnaire historiqne et critique, published at Amsterdam in 1750, has additional information, and a list of the subjects of the published sermons.
