= Joseph Derenbourg =

Franco-German orientalist (1811–1895)

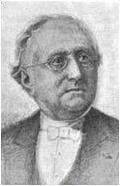
Joseph Derenbourg

Joseph Derenbourg, or Joseph Naftali Derenburg (21 August 1811 – 29 July 1895) was a Franco-German orientalist.

He was born in Mainz (then French-controlled), as a youngest son of the lawyer Jacob Derenburg.

According to the 1911 Encyclopædia Britannica, "He was a considerable force in the educational revival of Jewish education in France." He made great contributions to the knowledge of Saadia, and planned a complete edition of Saadia's works in Arabic and French. A large part of this work appeared during his lifetime.

He also wrote an Essai sur l'histoire et la géographie de la Palestine (Paris, 1867). This was an original contribution to the history of the Jews and Judaism in the time of Christ, and has been much used by later writers on the subject (e.g., by Emil Schürer). He also published in collaboration with his son Hartwig Derenbourg, Opuscules et traités d'Abou-l-Walid (with translation, 1880); Deux Versions hebraïques du livre de Kalilah et Dimnah (1881), and a Latin translation of the same story under the title Joannis de Capua directorium vitae humanae (1889); Commentaire de Maïmonide sur la Mischnah Seder Tohorot (Berlin, 1886-1891); and edited the second edition of Silvestre de Sacy's Séances de Hariri (Paris, Hachette, 1853). In 1871, Derenbourg annotated and published in Paris an important medieval work on Hebrew grammar, taken from a manuscript retrieved in Yemen, and which he titled Manuel du Lecteur (Readers Manual). The manuscript is one of the sole remaining copies of a Hebrew variant of the work known as Maḥberet ha-Tiğān (Manual of the Codices), outlining the rules of Hebrew grammar. He died in 1895 at Bad Ems, Hesse-Nassau.

== See also ==
- Hartwig Derenbourg
