= Biblical grammarians =

Biblical grammarians were linguists whose understanding of the Bible at least partially related to the science of Hebrew language. Tannaitic and Ammoraic exegesis rarely toiled in grammatical problems; grammar was a borrowed science from the Arab world in the medieval period. Despite its foreign influence, however, Hebrew grammar was a strongly Jewish product and developed independently. Scholars have continued to study grammar throughout the ages, until the present. Those mentioned in this article are a few of the most eminent grammarians.

== Early influences ==
=== Masoretes ===
The Masoretes, who solidified the Masoretic Text of the Hebrew Bible, vocalized and punctuated the biblical text. Most of the work of the Masoretes is generally anonymous, though we know several names of Masoretes. While their work essentially focused on establishing the correct text and not the principles of grammar, the Masoretes contributed to the future study of biblical language. Many future grammarians continued the efforts of the Masorah and gave it a “central place in their works.”

== Medieval grammarians ==
=== Saadia Ga’on ===
Saadia Ga’on dealt with inflections and roots in his grammatical work. These contributions laid essential foundations for future grammarians. He also wrote about exceptions. His contemporary, Menahem ben Saruk, elaborated upon the study of roots, and was also the first grammarian to write in Hebrew. A pupil of Saadia’s, Dunash ben Labrat, criticized both Menahem and Saadia’s works but made many important contributions to understanding roots. Defenses of both sides by scholars such as Rabben Tam and ibn Ezra continued for centuries.

=== Rashi ===
Rashi's commentary attempted to explain the simple meaning of the biblical text. In many places in his commentary, Rashi explains a linguistic or grammatical rule, providing several examples of other places in which that rule applies. Many of his principles he derives from the work of Menahem and Dunash. Evidence shows that Rashi understood the difference between biblical Hebrew and rabbinic Hebrew. Rashi also utilized Old French to explain the meaning of words that could not be otherwise explained.

=== Abraham ibn Ezra ===
In his introduction to the Pentateuch, Ibn Ezra writes that his commentary is “bound by the cords of grammar.” The way to appreciating the text is to understand the simple meaning, and he opposed explanations of the text that do not explain the original intent. Generally, he limited applying predecessors’ laws to understanding the text and avoided outlandish explanations of exceptions. A specific opposition ibn Ezra had was to the explanation of “plene versus defective spelling.” The Spanish commentator also wrote several grammatical works outside his biblical commentary.

=== Joseph Kimhi ===
Joseph Kimhi of the 12th century composed Sefer Zikkaron, introducing a new understanding of vowels. His two sons, Moses and David, also were grammarians. The Kimhis were exegetes who relied most on peshat and avoided homiletical interpretations, and especially for David, philology played a large role in that.

== Modern grammarians ==
=== The maskilim ===
The maskilim abandoned the use of rabbinic Hebrew and returned to biblical Hebrew. They felt serious grammar was of major import for modernization. Naphtali Herz Wessely and Judah Leib Ben Ze’ev were major perpetrators of this movement of Hebrew, which may have led to modern Hebrew. Study of Hebrew grammar had been neglected for nearly two centuries until the arrival of Moses Mendelssohn.
