= Judah ben David Hayyuj =

10th-century Moroccan Jewish linguist

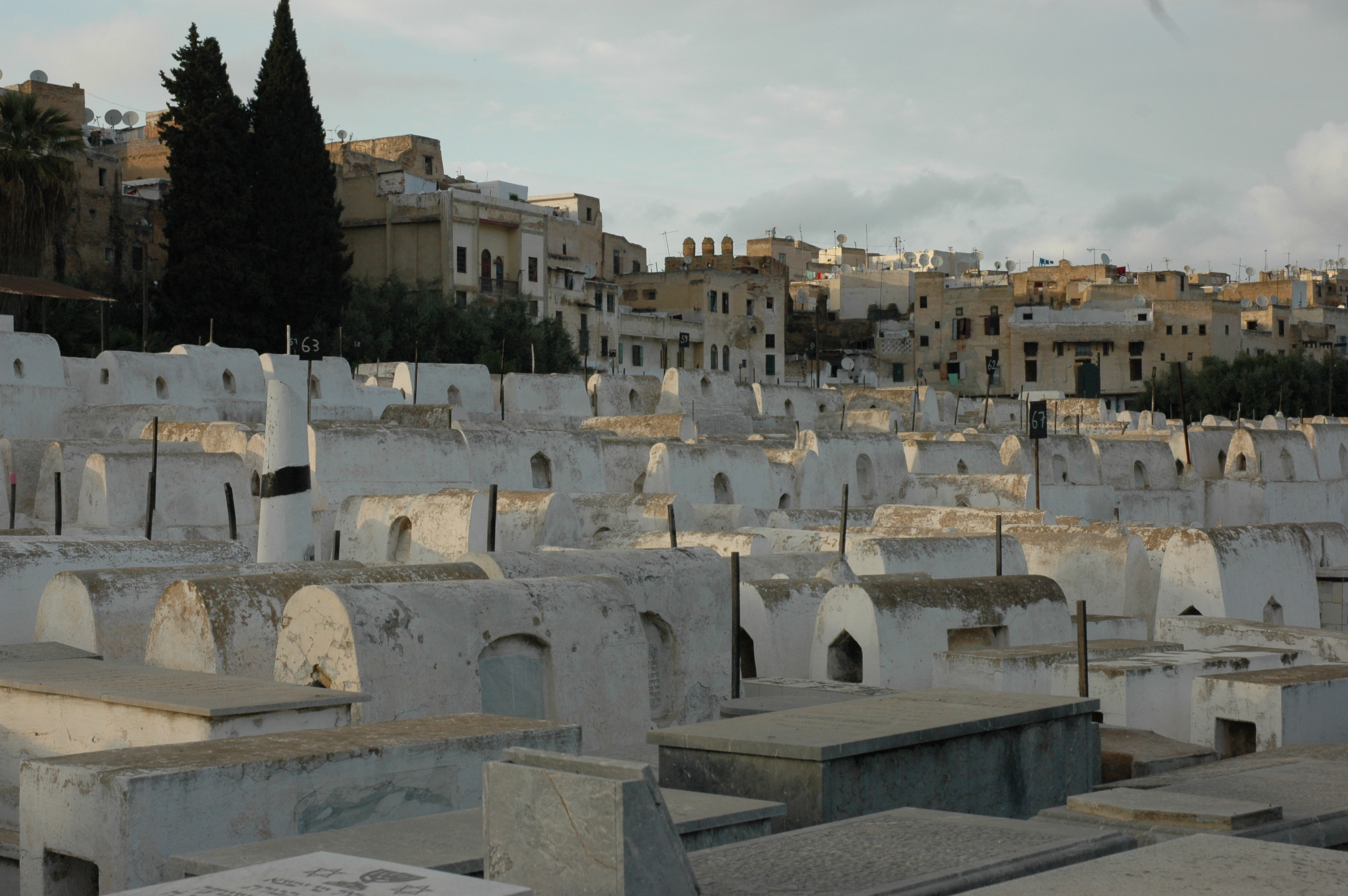

Judah ben David Hayyuj (Hebrew: יְהוּדָה בֶּן דָּוִד חַיּוּג׳, romanized: Yəhuḏā ben Dawiḏ Ḥayyuj, Arabic: أبو زكريا يحيى بن داؤد حيوج, romanized: Abū Zakariyya Yahyá ibn Dawūd Ḥayyūj) was a Moroccan Jew of Al-Andalus born in North Africa. He was a linguist and is regarded as the father of Hebrew scientific grammar.

Judah was born in Fez, then part of the Idrisid dynasty, about 945. At an early age, he went to Córdoba during the Golden age of Jewish culture in Spain, where he seems to have remained till his death about 1000. He was the first to propose that Hebrew words stem from triconsonantal roots.

== Career ==
Hayyuj was a pupil of Menahem ben Saruq, whom he later helped to defend against the attacks of Dunash ben Labrat and his followers. Later in life, Hayyuj developed his theories about Hebrew grammar and was obliged to step forward as an opponent of the grammatical theories of his teacher. His thorough knowledge of Arabic grammatical literature led him to apply the theories elaborated by Arabic grammarians to Hebrew grammar and thus become the founder of the scientific study of that discipline.

Preceding scholars had found the greatest difficulty in accounting, by the laws of Hebrew morphology, for the divergences existing between the so-called "strong" and "weak" verbs. Much ingenuity was spent discovering the principles that controlled the conjugation of the verbs. The weakness of Menahem's assertion that there are stems in Hebrew containing three letters, two letters, and one letter, respectively, was pointed out by Dunash; but, although the latter was on the road to a solution of the problem, it was left to Ḥayyuj to find the key.

== His works ==
Hayyuj announced that all Hebrew stems consist of three letters and maintained that when one of those letters was a "vowel letter," such a letter could be regarded as "concealed" in diverse ways in the various verbal forms. To substantiate his theory, he wrote the treatise upon which his reputation chiefly rests, the Kitāb al-Af‘āl Dhawāt Ḥurūf al-Līn "The Book of Verbs Containing Weak Letters." The treatise is in three parts: the first is devoted to verbs whose first radical is a weak letter, the second to verbs whose second radical is weak, and the third to verbs whose third radical is weak. Within each division, he furnishes what he considers a complete list of the class' verbs, enumerates various verb forms, and, when necessary, adds brief comments and explanations. Preceding each division, the principles underlying the formation of the stems belonging to the division are systematically outlined in a series of introductory chapters.

As a supplement to this treatise he wrote a second, which he called the Kitāb al-Af‘āl Dhawāt al-Mithlayn "The Book of Verbs Containing Double Letters", and in which he points out the principles governing the verbs whose second and third radicals are alike. He furnishes a list of these verbs and their various forms occurring in the Bible. Besides the two treatises on verbs, Hayyuj wrote Kitāb al-Tanqīṭ "The Book of Punctuation". This work, probably written before his two chief treatises, attempts to set forth the features underlying the Masoretic use of the vowels and tone. In this work, he deals chiefly with nouns, and their purpose is more of a practical than of a theoretical character.

A fourth work, the Kitāb al-Nutaf "The Book of Extracts," is known to have been written by Hayyuj, but only a few fragments and quotations by later authors have survived. This was a supplement to his two grammatical works on the verb, and he noted the verbs he omitted in the former treatises. In doing this he anticipated in a measure Jonah ibn Janāḥ's Mustalḥaq, which was devoted to this very purpose. He arranged and discussed the verbal stems in question, not alphabetically, but in the order in which they occur in the Hebrew Bible. An edition consisting of all discovered fragments was published by Nasir Basal in 2001.

== Influence ==
Hayyuj exerted an immense influence on succeeding generations. All later Hebrew grammarians up to the present day base their works on his; and the technical terms still employed in current Hebrew grammars are most of them simply translations of the Arabic terms employed by Hayyuj. His first three works were translated into Hebrew twice, first by Moses ibn Gikatilla and later by Abraham ibn Ezra. The following modern editions of his works have appeared:

- Ewald and Dukes, "Beiträge zur Geschichte der Aeltesten Auslegung und Spracherklärung des Alten Testaments," Stuttgart, 1844. (i. 123, ii. 155; vol. iii. contains Ibn Ezra's translation of Hayyuj; linked here).
- John W. Nutt, "Two Treatises on Verbs Containing Feeble and Double Letters by R. Jehuda Ḥayug of Fez: From a Hebrew Translation of the Original Arabic by R. Moses Gikatilla of Cordova; to Which Is Added the [Arabic text of the] Treatise on Punctuation by the Same Author, Translated by Aben Ezra: Edited from Bodleian MSS. with an English Translation." London and Berlin, 1870 (linked here).
- M. Jastrow, Jr., "The Weak and Geminative Verbs in Hebrew by . . . Hayyug, the Arabic Text Now Published for the First Time." Leyden, 1897. (Comp. Bacher in "J. Q. R." xi. 504-514.)

== Editions ==
- Nasir Basal: : כתאב אלנתאף לר׳ יהודה חיוג׳ [Kitāb al-Nutaf le-R. Yehudah Ḥayyūj. A Critical Edition]. Texts and Studies in the Hebrew Language and Related Subjects 11. Tel Aviv 2001.
- Daniel Sivan and Ali Wated: שלושת חיבורי הדקדוק של ר׳ יהודה חיוג׳ במקורם הערבי ובתרגום לעברית חדשה. מהדורה ביקורתית [Three Treatises on Hebrew Grammar by R. Judah Ḥayyuj. A New Critical Edition of the Arabic Text with a Modern Hebrew Translation]. Beer Sheva 2011. ISBN 978-965-536-096-7
- Aharon Maman and Ephraim ben-Porat: כִּתַאבּ אַלנֻּתַף: פירושו הדקדוקי של ר׳ יהודה חיוג׳ לספרי נביאים בעיבוד עלי בן סלימן [Kitâb al-Nutaf: R. Yehuda Ḥayyūj’s Philological Commentary to the Books of Prophets in ʿAli ibn Suleymân’s Compendium]. Texts and Studies, New Series 12. Jerusalem 2012. ISBN 978-965-481-044-9

== Bibliography ==
- W. Bacher, Die Grammatische Terminologie, des ... Hajjug, Vienna, 1882 (comp. with this N. Porges in Monatsschrift, xxxii.285-288, 330-336);
- W. Bacher, in Winter and Wünsche, Die Jüdische Literatur, ii.161-169;
- Israelsohn, in R. E. J. xix.306;
- J. Derenbourg, ib. xix.310;
- Harkavy, ib. xxxi.288;
- N. Porges, in Monatsschrift, xxxiv.321;
- L. Luzzatto, in Il Vessillo Israelitico, xliv.385;
- B. Drachman, Die Stellung und Bedeutung des J. Hajjug in der Geschichte der Hebräischen Grammatik, Breslau, 1885;
- Morris Jastrow, Jr., Abu Zakarijja Jahja b. Dawud Hajjug und Seine Zwei Grammatischen Schriften über die Verben mit Schwachen Buchstaben und die Verben mit Doppelbuchstaben, Giessen, 1885.
