= Ernst Bertheau =

German orientalist and theologian

Ernst Bertheau (23 November 1812, in Hamburg – 17 May 1888, in Göttingen) was a German orientalist and theologian, known for his exegetical studies of the Old Testament.

From 1832 he studied theology and oriental languages in Berlin, then continued his education at the University of Göttingen as a pupil of Heinrich Ewald, Karl Gieseler and Friedrich Lücke. In 1839 he obtained his habilitation for Old Testament exegesis and oriental languages at Göttingen, where in 1843 he became a full professor. At the university, he gave lectures on exegesis, archaeology and theology of the Old Testament and instructions in Arabic, Chaldean and Syriac.

== Published works ==
Among his numerous writings was an edition of the Syrian grammar of Gregorius Bar-Hebraeus, titled Gregorii Bar Hebraei qui et Abulpharaǵ Grammatica linguae Syriacae (1843). He was also the author of the following:

- Die sieben Gruppen mosaischer Gesetze in den drei mittleren Büchern des Pentateuchs, 1840 – The seven groups of Mosaic laws in the three middle books of the Pentateuch.
- Zur Geschichte der Israeliten: Zwei Abhandlungen, 1842 – On the history of the Israelites: two essays.
- Die Sprüche Salomo's, 1843 – The Proverbs of Solomon.
- Das Buch der Richter und Rut, 1845 – The Books of Judges and Ruth.
- Die Bücher der Chronik, 1854 – The Books of Chronicles.
- Die Bücher Numeri, Deuteronomium, und Josua, 1861 – The Book of Numbers, Deuteronomy and Joshua.
- Die Bücher Esra, Nechemia und Ester, 1862 – The Books of Ezra, Nehemiah and Esther.
