= Jonah ibn Janah =

Jewish rabbi and grammarian (c. 990–1055)

Personal life
- Born: between 985 and 990 Córdoba, Caliphate of Córdoba (modern-day Spain)
- Died: 1055 Zaragoza, Taifa of Zaragoza (modern-day Spain)
- Occupation: Physician

Religious life
- Religion: Judaism

Jonah ibn Janah (Judeo-Arabic: יוֹנָה אִבְּן גַּ֗נָאח, romanized: Yonā ibn Janāḥ) or Abū al-Walīd Marwān ibn Janāḥ (Arabic: أبو الوليد مروان بن جناح), (c. 990 – c. 1055), was a Jewish rabbi, physician and Hebrew grammarian active in al-Andalus (Muslim-ruled Spain). Born in Córdoba, ibn Janah was mentored there by Isaac ibn Gikatilla and Isaac ibn Mar Saul ben Levi before he moved around 1012 due to the siege and sack of the city by Berbers. He then settled in Zaragoza, where he wrote Kitab al-Mustalhaq, which expanded on the research of Judah ben David Hayyuj and led to a series of controversial exchanges with Samuel ibn Naghrillah that remained unresolved during their lifetimes.

His magnum opus, Kitab al-Tanqīḥ, contained both the first complete grammar for Hebrew and a dictionary of Biblical Hebrew, and is considered "the most influential Hebrew grammar for centuries" and a foundational text in Hebrew scholarship. Ibn Janah is considered a very influential scholar of Hebrew grammar; his works and theories were popular and cited by Hebrew scholars in Europe and the Middle East. His second seminal work of no less importance was a book entitled Kitāb al-Talkhīṣ ("Book of the Commentary"), the oldest monograph on the nomenclature of simple drugs.

== Name ==
His first name Jonah (Hebrew: יוֹנָה, romanized: yonā, lit. 'dove') spawned the Arabic nasab ibn Janāḥ (lit. "the Winged"; Ibn Falaquera uses Hebrew equivalent בעל הכנפים), which became a family name. He is also called by the Arabic ism Marwān (Ibn Ezra cites him as "Marinos") (Note: Ibn Ezra's habit was to Hebraicize Arabic names: he also calls Dunash ben Labrat "Adanim" (e.g.). Although Marinos is originally a Greek name, it was known to Ibn Ezra through the Talmudic sages who bore it. He is followed in the use of "Marinos" by Abraham ibn Daud and the Kimchis, among others. Ibn Yahya, followed by Giulio Bartolocci and others, mistakenly records Marinus as Jonah's father. According to Derenbourg, "Marwan" represents Jonah by way of מרון>מר יונה, but Steinschneider and Bacher discard this theory.) and by the kunya Abū al-Walīd, which was often given to men named Jonah.

== Early life ==
There is little information on his family or early life, mostly from biographical details in his writings. He was born in Córdoba, Spain, then the capital of the Umayyad state of Córdoba, between 985 and 990. He studied in the nearby Lucena; his teachers there included Isaac ibn Gikatilla and Isaac ibn Mar Saul. His education included the languages of Arabic, Hebrew, and Aramaic, tafsir or exegesis of the Bible and the Quran, as well as rabbinic literature. Ibn Mar Saul was a master of poetry, and ibn Janah attempted to write some Hebrew poetry himself but was unsuccessful at it. Ibn Gikatilla was an expert in both Hebrew and Arabic grammar, and under his tutelage, ibn Janah became fluent in Arabic, familiar with Arabic literature and "acquired an easy and graceful" Arabic writing style. Arabic became his language of choice for most of his writings. Ibn Janah also mentioned Judah ben David Hayyuj as one of his major influences. He was unlikely to have met him because Hayyuj was active in Córdoba and died before ibn Janah returned there.

Around 1012, he returned to Córdoba, where he studied and practiced medicine. By this time, Iberia was in the Fitna of al-Andalus, a period of instability and civil war. Córdoba was besieged and sacked by Berber rebels, who committed atrocities on its citizens, including the Jews. The caliphate of Córdoba soon disintegrated into small states known as taifas.

Ibn Janah and many other Jews were forced to leave the capital. He moved to the Upper March region of al-Andalus, and, after a period of wandering there, settled in Zaragoza. He had at least one son.

== Career in Zaragoza ==
He remained in Zaragoza until the end of his life, where he practiced medicine and wrote books. He wrote at least one medical book, Kitāb al-Taḫlīṣ (Arabic for "Book of the Commentary"), on formulae and measures of medical remedies, which for decades was thought to be lost, but recently discovered. Today, the only extant manuscript of this work is preserved in the Süleymaniye Library in Istanbul, Turkey (MS Aya Sofia 3603, fols. 1v–90v).

Ibn Janah became known as a successful physician; he was often called by the laqab "the Physician" and was mentioned by the 13th-century Syrian physician ibn Abi Usaybi'a in his collection of biographies, Lives of the Physicians.

Aside from his work in medicine, he also worked on the field of Hebrew grammar and philology, joining other scholars in Zaragoza such as Solomon ibn Gabirol.

=== Kitāb al-Mustalḥaq ===
Ibn Janah was deeply influenced by the works of Judah ben David Hayyuj. Earlier Hebrew grammarians, such as Menahem ben Saruq and the Saadia Gaon, had believed that Hebrew words could have letter roots of any length. Hayyuj argued that this was not the case, and Hebrew roots are consistently triliteral. In his work, Kitāb al-mustalḥaq "Book of Criticism" (also translated as the "Book of Annexation", Hebrew: ספר ההשגה, romanized: Sefer HaHassāḡā), ibn Janah strongly supported Hayyuj's work, but proposed some improvements. Among others, he added 54 roots to Hayyuj's 467, filled some gaps and clarified some ambiguities in his theories. A follow-up of this work was written by Ibn Janah, entitled Kitāb al-Taswi’a "Book of Reprobation", which he composed as a response to critics of his previous work.

=== Dispute with Hayyuj's supporters ===
In the Kitāb al-mustalḥaq, ibn Janah praised Hayyuj's works and acknowledged them as the source for most of his knowledge of Hebrew grammar. He intended for this work to be uncontroversial, and to be an extension to the works of Hayyuj, whom he deeply admired.

However, the work offended Hayyuj's supporters. They considered Hayyuj the greatest authority of all times, worthy of taqlid or unquestioning conformity. They were offended when ibn Janah, a relatively junior scholar at the time, criticized their master and found his works incomplete. One of the disciples of Hayyuj was Samuel ibn Naghrillah, the vizier of the Taifa of Granada. Ibn Janah subsequently wrote the brief Risãlat al-Tanbīh "Letter of Admonition", which defended his views, as well as the Risalat al-Taqrīb wa l-Tashīl "Letter of Approximation and Facilitation", which sought to clarify Hayyuj's work for beginners.

While visiting his friend Abu Sulaiman ibn Taraka, he met a stranger from Granada who enumerated various attacks on ibn Janah's views. Ibn Janah wrote the Kitab al-Taswi'a to counter the arguments. (Note: According to Martínez-Delgado 2010, p. 501, the stranger was an adversary who attacked his view, while Scherman 1982, p. 64 says that the stranger merely relayed what he remembered from ibn Naghrillah's plan to attack him.) Ibn Naghrilla then wrote Rasāʾil al-rifāq "Letters from Friends", attacking ibn Janah, who then responded by writing the Kitāb al-Tashwīr "Book of Confusion". Further pamphlets were exchanged between the two, which were later of great benefit to Hebrew grammarians. The pamphlets were in Arabic and never translated into Hebrew. Many were lost, but some were reprinted and translated into French. The debates were unresolved during their lifetimes.

=== Kitāb al-Talkhīṣ ===
The Kitāb al-Talkhīṣ or "Book of the Commentary" is the only known medical treatise by Ibn Janah. It is divided into twenty-seven chapters corresponding to the letters of the Arabic alphabet except ẓāʾ. Most chapters are subdivided into three parts, the first on medicinal drugs (mainly plant-based), the second on weights and measures and the third on difficult terms. There are a total of 1099 entries in the Talkhīṣ.

=== Kitab al-Tanqīḥ ===
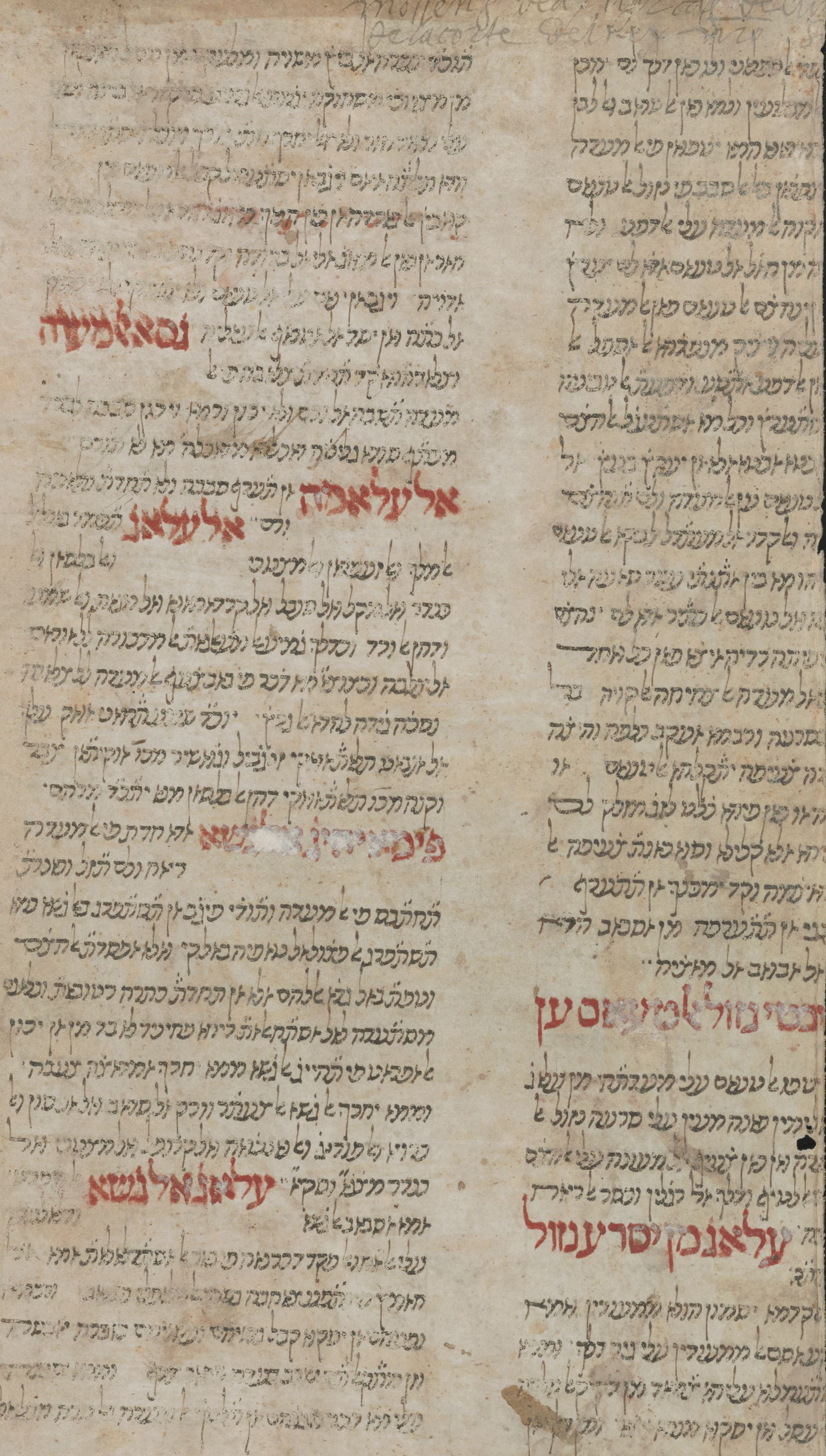
A page from a copy of ibn Janah's magnum opus Kitab al-Tanqih, translated to Hebrew by Judah ibn Tibbon.

Towards the end of his life, ibn Janah wrote what is considered his magnum opus, the Kitab al-Tanqīḥ ("Book of Minute Research", known in Hebrew translation as the Sefer haDiqduq). The book is divided into two sections: Kitāb al-Lumaʿ "Book of Many-Colored Flowerbeds") (Hebrew Sefer haRiqma), which covered Hebrew grammar, and Kitab al-Uṣūl "Book of Roots" (Hebrew Sefer haShorashim), a dictionary of Hebrew words arranged by root. Ibn Janah's treatises on grammar greatly influenced men of later generations, among whom was Tanhum of Jerusalem (1220–1291), who cites ibn Janah in his Judeo-Arabic lexicon, al-Murshid al-kāfī.

==== Kitāb al-Lumaʿ ====
Kitāb al-Lumaʿ was the first complete Hebrew grammar ever produced. During his time, works of Arabic grammar and tafsir greatly influenced Hebrew grammarians. In this work, ibn Janah drew from the Arabic grammatical works of Sibawayh, al-Mubarrad, and others, both referencing them and directly copying from them. The book consisted of 54 chapters, inspired by how Arabic grammars were organized. By using similarities between the two Semitic languages, he adapted existing rules and theories of the Arabic language and used them for Hebrew. These introductions allowed the Bible to be analyzed by criteria similar to those used by Quranic scholars of the time.

Ibn Janah also introduced the concept of lexical substitution in interpreting Classical Hebrew. This concept, in which a closely associated word substituted the meaning of a word in the Bible, proved controversial. The twelfth-century biblical commentator Abraham ibn Ezra strongly opposed it and called it "madness" close to heresy.

==== Kitab al-Usul ====
The Kitab al-Uṣūl was arranged into 22 chapters—one for each letter of the Hebrew alphabet. The dictionary included more than 2000 roots, nearly all of them triliteral. Less than five percent of the roots have more than three letters, and they were added as appendix in each chapter. Definitions for the words were derived from the Talmud, Hebrew Bible, or other classical Jewish works, as well as similar Arabic and Aramaic words. This approach was controversial and new in Hebrew scholarship. Ibn Janah defended his method by pointing to precedents in the Talmud as well as previous works by Jewish writers in Lower Mesopotamia and North Africa, which all used examples from other languages to define Hebrew words.

== Legacy ==
Ibn Janah died in approximately 1055, his works quickly became popular among Hebrew scholars in Spain. They were initially inaccessible in other parts of Europe, where they did not know Arabic. However, in the late twelfth century, Spanish-Jewish scholars in Italy and the sages of Occitania in southern France spread ibn Janah's work there and to the rest of Europe. Ibn Janah's main work, Kitab al-Tanqīḥ, was translated into Hebrew by Judah ben Saul ibn Tibbon in 1214. This translation and others spread ibn Janah's methods and fame outside the Arabic-speaking Jews. Hebrew scholars and exegetes subsequently cited him in the Iberian peninsula, the Middle East and southern France.

The Kitāb al-Uṣūl was published in English in 1875 as "The Book of Hebrew Roots." A second printing with some corrections occurred in 1968. It was republished in Hebrew in 1876.

His work, research, and methodology are considered to be deeply important. The Encyclopedia of Jews in the Islamic World (EJIW) describes him as "one of the best-known, most influential, closely followed, and highly praised scholars" of Hebrew. Professor of Judaic Studies Michael L. Satlow writes that Kitab al-Tanqīḥ is "fundamental to the study of Hebrew grammar"; Sephardic studies professor Zion Zohar calls it "the most influential Hebrew grammar for centuries", and an example of where "medieval Judeo-Arabic literary culture reached its apogee". Writer David Tene "rhapsodizes" on the Kitāb al-Lumaʿ, calling it "the first complete description of Biblical Hebrew, and no similar work - comparable in scope, depth and precision - was written until modern times...[it was] the high point of linguistic thought in all [medieval grammatical] history". The EJIW described the Kitāb al-Uṣūl as "the basis of all other medieval Hebrew dictionaries". The Jewish Encyclopedia, however, notes "serious gaps" in the Kitāb al-Tanqīh, because it does not discuss vowels and accents, and because it omits to explain Hayyuj's works on which it is based on. The Encyclopædia Britannica calls him "perhaps the most important medieval Hebrew grammarian and lexicographer" and says that his works "clarif[ied] the meaning of many words" and contained the "origin of various corrections by modern textual critics".
