= Biblical Hebrew orthography =

Hebrew writing systems

Biblical Hebrew orthography refers to the various systems which have been used to write the Biblical Hebrew language. Biblical Hebrew has been written in a number of different writing systems over time, and in those systems its spelling and punctuation have also undergone changes.

Name	Paleo-Hebrew	Block	Samaritan	Phonetic value (Pre‑Exilic) (IPA)	Greek (LXX, Secunda)
Aleph	Aleph	א	ࠀ	[ʔ], ∅	∅
Beth	Beth	ב	ࠁ	[b]	β
Gimel	Gimel	ג	ࠂ	[ɡ]	γ
Daleth	Daleth	ד	ࠃ	[d]	δ
He	Heh	ה	ࠄ	[h], ∅	∅
Waw	Waw	ו	ࠅ	[w], ∅	ου, υ, ω (Note: <ου> as a consonant <υ> as a consonant after vowels <ου ω> as a mater lectionis)
Zayin	Zayin	ז	ࠆ	[z]	ζ (σ) (Note: originally written with <σ> like the other sibilants, but later was written with <ζ>)
Heth	Heth	ח	ࠇ	[ħ] (Note: may be accompanied by vowel mutation) [χ]	∅, χ (Note: <χ γ> only in the Septuagint, when representing original /χ ʁ/)
Teth	Teth	ט	ࠈ	[tʼ]	τ
Yodh	Yodh	י	ࠉ	[j], ∅	ι
Kaph	Kaph	כ, ך	ࠊ	[k]	χ (κ) (Note: /k p t/ are consistently written in the Secunda by <χ φ θ>, but the Septuagint also occasionally uses <κ π τ>)
Lamedh	Lamedh	ל	ࠋ	[l]	λ
Mem	Mem	מ, ם	ࠌ	[m]	μ
Nun	Nun	נ, ן	ࠍ	[n]	ν
Samekh	Samekh	ס	ࠎ	[s]	σ
Ayin	Ayin	ע	ࠏ	[ʕ], [ʁ]	∅ γ
Pe	Pe	פ, ף	ࠐ	[p]	φ (π)
Sadhe	Sadhe	צ, ץ	ࠑ	[sʼ]	σ
Qoph	Qoph	ק	ࠒ	[q] or [kʼ]	κ
Resh	Resh	ר	ࠓ	[r]	ρ
Shin	Shin	ש	ࠔ	[ʃ], [ɬ]	σ
Taw	Taw	ת	ࠕ	[t]	θ (τ)

== Proto-Canaanite script ==
The earliest Hebrew writing discovered so far, dating back to the 10th century BCE, was found at Khirbet Qeiyafa in July 2008 by Israeli archaeologist Yossi Garfinkel. The 15 cm x 16.5 cm (5.9 in x 6.5 in) trapezoid pottery sherd (ostracon) has five lines of text written in ink written in the Proto-Canaanite alphabet (the old form of the Phoenician alphabet). That the language of the tablet is Hebrew is suggested by the presence of the words תעש tʕś "to do" and עבד ʕbd "servant". (Note: used in the tablet as a verb, unlike in Phoenician where this root is only nominal) The tablet is written from left to right, indicating that Hebrew writing was still in the formative stage.

== Phoenician and Paleo-Hebrew script ==
The Israelite tribes who settled in the land of Israel adopted the Phoenician script around the 12th century BCE, as found in the Gezer calendar (circa 10th century BCE). This script developed into the Paleo-Hebrew script in the tenth or ninth centuries BCE. The Paleo-Hebrew alphabet's main differences from the Phoenician script were "a curving to the left of the dowstrokes in the 'long-legged' letter-signs... the consistent use of a Waw with a concave top, [and an] x-shaped Taw." (Note: At times the Moabites, Ammonites, Edomites, and Philistines would also use the Paleo-Hebrew script, see Yardeni (1997:25)) The oldest inscriptions in Paleo-Hebrew script are dated to around the middle of the 9th century BCE, the most famous being the Mesha Stele in the Moabite language (which might be considered a dialect of Hebrew). The ancient Hebrew script was in continuous use until the early 6th century BCE, the end of the First Temple period.

In the Second Temple Period the Paleo-Hebrew script gradually fell into disuse. The epigraphic material in the ancient Hebrew script is poor in the Second Temple Period. Pentateuch fragments in the ancient Hebrew script dating to the 3rd or 2nd century BCE were found in Qumran, Hasmonaean coins and coins from the Bar Kokhba revolt (132-135 BCE), and ostraca from Masada before its fall in 74 CE are among the youngest finds in the ancient script, as well as the use of divine names in texts otherwise in other scripts. It seems that the Paleo-Hebrew script was completely abandoned among the Jews after the failed Bar Kochba revolt. The Samaritans retained the ancient Hebrew alphabet, which evolved into the modern Samaritan alphabet. In fact, the adoption of the script by the Samaritans may have influenced the Rabbis' negative view of the script and lead to its final rejection. (Note: As an example of the Rabbis' view of the script, see Sanhedrin 21b "The Torah was originally given to Israel in this [Assyrian] script. When they sinned, it became רועץ.")

The only papyrus document from the First Temple period that has survived was found in the Wadi Murabba'at, and is dated to the 7th century BCE. However, fiber impressions on the back of many bullae of that period show that papyrus was in common use in that region. Presumably papyrus was common in the pre-exilic period, while in the Babylonian exile hide scrolls were used, given that papyrus does not grow there.

== Aramaic script ==
By the end of the First Temple period the Aramaic script, a separate descendant of the Phoenician script, became widespread throughout the region, gradually displacing Paleo-Hebrew. The Jews who were exiled to Babylon became familiar with Aramaic out of necessity, while the Jews remaining in Judea seem to have mostly lost the writing tradition. According to tradition, the Aramaic script became established with the return of Ezra from exile around the 4th century BCE. The oldest documents that have been found in the Aramaic Script are fragments of the scrolls of Exodus, Samuel, and Jeremiah found among the Dead Sea scrolls, dating from the late 3rd and early 2nd centuries BCE. The modern Hebrew alphabet, also known as the Assyrian or Square script, is a descendant of the Aramaic alphabet. It seems that the earlier Biblical books were originally written in the Paleo-Hebrew script, while the later books were written directly in the later Assyrian script. Some Qumran texts written in the Assyrian script write the tetragrammaton and some other divine names in Paleo-Hebrew, and this practice is also found in several Jewish-Greek Biblical translations. (Note: Though some of these translations wrote the tetragrammaton in the square script, see Tov (1992:220))

While spoken Hebrew continued to evolve into Mishnaic Hebrew, the scribal tradition for writing the Torah gradually developed. A number of regional "book-hand" styles developed for the purpose of Torah manuscripts and occasionally other literary works, distinct from the calligraphic styles used mainly for private purposes. The Sephardi and Ashkenazi book-hand styles were later adapted to printed fonts after the invention of the printing press.

== Polyphonic letters ==
The Phoenician script had dropped five characters by the twelfth century BCE, reflecting the language's twenty-two consonantal phonemes. As a result, the 22 letters of the Paleo-Hebrew alphabet numbered less than the consonant phonemes of ancient Biblical Hebrew; in particular, the letters ח, ע, ש could each mark two different phonemes. After a sound shift the letters ח ,ע became homophones, but (except in Samaritan Hebrew) ש remained multiphonic. The old Babylonian vocalization wrote a superscript ס above the ש to indicate it took the value /s/, while the Masoretes added the shin dot to distinguish between the two varieties of the letter. The Aramaic script began developing special final forms for certain letters in the 5th century BCE, though this was not always a consistent rule (as reflected in the Qumran practice).

== Matres lectionis ==
The original Hebrew alphabet consisted only of consonants, but gradually the letters א ,ה ,ו ,י also became used to indicate vowels, known as matres lectionis (Latin: "mothers of reading") when used in this function. It is thought that this was a product of phonetic development: for instance, *bayt 'house' shifted to בֵּית in construct state but retained its spelling. While no examples of early Hebrew orthography have been found, older Phoenician and Moabite texts show how First Temple period Hebrew would have been written. Phoenician inscriptions from the tenth century BCE do not indicate matres lectionis in the middle or the end of a word, e.g. לפן (instead of לפני), or ז (instead of זה), similarly to the Hebrew Gezer Calendar: ירח (instead of ירחו), or שערמ (instead of שעורים). Matres lectionis were later added word-finally, for instance the Mesha inscription has בללה (modern בלילה), and בנתי (modern בניתי); at the time, a word-final "o" sound was indicated by ה (heh) instead of the modern ו (vav): the Mesha inscription spells ארצה for artzo "his land" and בנה for bno "his son". This usage of ה for the word-final "o" sound is still rarely found in the Bible (Genesis sometimes spells אהלה instead of אהלו for ohalo "his tent") and has been fossilized in some words (פה po "here", איפה eifo "where", כה ko "thus") and proper names (שלמה Shlomo, שילה Shiloh, פרעה Par'o = Pharaoh). At this stage they were not yet used word-medially, compare Siloam inscription זדה versus איש (= אש). Some proper names retain their spelling from this stage in the Bible and to this day: David is spelled דוד instead of דויד or דוויד, Moses משה instead of מושה, Aaron אהרן instead of אהרון, Joshua יהושע instead of יהושוע. The relative terms defective and full or plene are used to refer to alternative spellings of a word with less or more matres lectionis, respectively. (Note: Ktiv male, the Hebrew term for full spelling, has become de rigueur in Modern Hebrew.)

The Hebrew Bible was presumably originally written in a more defective orthography than found in any of the texts known today. Of the extant textual witnesses of the Hebrew Bible, the Masoretic text is generally the most conservative in its use of matres lectionis, with the Samaritan Pentateuch and its forebears being more full and the Qumran tradition showing the most liberal use of vowel letters. The Masoretic text mostly uses vowel letters for long vowels, showing the tendency to mark all long vowels except for word-internal /aː/. (Note: There are rare-cases of <א> being used medially as a true vowel letter, e.g. דָּאג for the usual דָּג 'fish'. Most cases, however, of <א> being used as a vowel letter stem from conservative spelling of words which originally contained /ʔ/, e.g. רֹאשׁ 'head' from original */raʔʃ/. See Blau (2010:86).) However, there are a number of exceptions, e.g. when the following syllable contains a vowel letter (as in קֹלֹוֹת 'voices' rather than קוֹלוֹת) or when a vowel letter already marks a consonant (so גּוֹיִם 'nations' rather than גּוֹיִים*), and within the Bible there is often little consistency in spelling. In the Qumran tradition, o- and u-type vowels, including short holem (מושה ,פוה ,חושך), qamets hatuf (חוכמה ,כול), and hatef qamets (אוניה), are usually represented by <ו>, while <י> is generally used for both long [iː] and tsere ((אבילים, מית), and final [iː] is often written as <-יא> in analogy to היא ,הביא, e.g. כיא, sometimes מיא. Lastly <ה> is found finally in forms like חוטה (Tiberian חוטא) or קורה (Tiberian קורא), while <א> may be used for a-quality in final position (e.g. עליהא) and in medial position (e.g. יאתום). Pre-Samaritan and Samaritan texts show full spellings in many categories (e.g. כוחי vs. Masoretic כחי in Genesis 49:3) but only rarely show full spelling of the Qumran type (but see Genesis 24:41b Samaritan נקיא vs. Masoretic נקי).

== Vocalization ==
In general the vowels of Biblical Hebrew were not indicated in the original text, but various sources attest them at various stages of development. Greek and Latin transcriptions of words from the Biblical text provide early evidence of the nature of Biblical Hebrew vowels. In particular, there is evidence from the rendering of proper nouns in the Koine Greek Septuagint (3rd-2nd centuries BCE), and the Greek alphabet transcription of the Hebrew Biblical text contained in the Secunda (3rd century CE, likely a copy of a preexisting text from before 100 BCE (Note: The Secunda is a transliteration of the Hebrew Biblical text contained in the Hexapla, a recension of the Old Testament compiled by Origen in the 3rd century CE. There is evidence that the text of the Secunda was written before 100 BCE, despite the later date of the Hexapla. For example, by the time of Origen <η αι> were pronounced [iː ɛː], a merger which had already begun around 100 BCE, while in the Secunda they are used to represent Hebrew /eː aj/, see Janssens (1982:14).)). In the 7th and 8th centuries CE various systems of vocalic notation were developed to indicate vowels in the Biblical text. The most prominent, best preserved, and the only system still in use, is the Tiberian vocalization system, created by scholars known as Masoretes around 850 CE. There are also various extant manuscripts making use of less common vocalization systems (Babylonian, and Palestinian), known as superlinear vocalizations because their vocalization marks are placed above the letters. (Note: The Palestinian system has two main subtypes and shows great variation. Blau (2010:7) The Babylonian vocalization occurred in two main types (simple / einfach and complex / kompliziert), with various subgroups differing as to their affinity with the Tiberian tradition. Sáenz-Badillos (1993:97–99)) (Note: In the Babylonian and Palestinian systems only the most important vowels were written, see Blau (2010:118).) In addition, the Samaritan reading tradition is independent of these systems, and was occasionally notated with a separate vocalization system. (Note: Almost all vocalized manuscripts use the Masoretic Text. However there are some vocalized Samaritan manuscripts from the Middle Ages, see Tov (1992:40)) These systems often record vowels at different stages of historical development; for example, the name of the Judge Samson is recorded in Greek as Σαμψών Sampsōn with the first vowel as /a/, while Tiberian שִמְשוֹן /ʃimʃon/ with /i/ shows the effect of the law of attenuation. All of these systems together are used to reconstruct the original vocalization of Biblical Hebrew.

The Tiberian vowel-sign šwa (ְ ) was used both to indicate lack of a vowel (quiescent šwa) and as another symbol to represent the phoneme /ă/, also represented by ḥataf pataḥ (ֲ). Before a laryngeal-pharyngeal, mobile šwa was pronounced as an ultrashort copy of the following vowel, e.g. וּבָקְעָה [uvɔqɔ̆ʕɔ], and as [ĭ] preceding /j/, e.g. תְדֵמְּיוּ֫נִי /θăðammĭjuni/. By contrast, ḥataf pataḥ would only be used when pronounced [ă]. In the Palestinian system these echo vowels were written with full vowel letters, see Yahalom (1997:12, 18–19) Pronunciation of šwa is attested by alternations in manuscripts like ארֲריך~ארְריך, ואשמֳעָה~ואשמְעָה. Use of ḥataf vowels was considered mandatory under gutturals but optional under other letters.

== Punctuation ==
At an early stage, documents written in the paleo-Hebrew script were divided by short vertical lines and later by dots, as reflected by the Mesha Stone, the Siloam inscription, the Ophel inscription, and paleo-Hebrew script documents from Qumran. Word division was not used in Phoenician inscriptions; however, there is not direct evidence for Biblical texts being written without word division, as suggested by Nachmanides in his introduction to the Torah. Word division using spaces was commonly used from the beginning of the 7th century BCE for documents in the Aramaic script.

In addition to marking vowels, the Tiberian system also uses cantillation marks, which serve to mark word stress, semantic structure, and the musical motifs used in formal recitation of the text.

== Reading traditions ==
While the Tiberian, Babylonian, and Palestinian reading traditions are extinct, various other systems of pronunciation have evolved over time, notably the Yemenite, Sephardi, Ashkenazi, and Samaritan traditions. Modern Hebrew pronunciation is also used by some to read Biblical texts. The modern reading traditions do not stem solely from the Tiberian system; for instance, the Sephardic tradition's distinction between qamatz gadol and qatan is pre-Tiberian. However, the only orthographic system used to mark vowels is the Tiberian vocalization.

== See also ==
- Biblical Hebrew
- Hebrew spelling

== Bibliography ==
- Ben-Ḥayyim, Ze'ev (2000). A Grammar of Samaritan Hebrew. Jerusalem: The Hebrew University Magnes Press. ISBN 1-57506-047-7.
- Blau, Joshua (2010). Phonology and Morphology of Biblical Hebrew. Winona Lake, Indiana: Eisenbrauns.
- Janssens, Gerard (1982). Studies in Hebrew historical linguistics based on Origen's Secunda. Orientalia Gandensia. Vol. 9. Uitgeverij Peeters. ISBN 978-2-8017-0189-8.
- Rendsburg, Gary A. (1997), "Ancient Hebrew Phonology", in Kaye, Alan (ed.), Phonologies of Asia and Africa, Eisenbrauns, pp. 65–83, archived from the original on 2011-07-20
- Sáenz-Badillos, Angel (1993). A History of the Hebrew Language. Cambridge University Press.
- Sperber, Alexander (1959). A Grammar of Masoretic Hebrew. Copenhagen: Ejnar Munksgaard.
- Tov, Emanuel (1992). Textual Criticism of the Hebrew Bible. Minneapolis: Augsburg Fortress. ISBN 0-8006-2687-7.
- Waltke, Bruce K.; O'Connor, M. (1990). An Introduction to Biblical Hebrew Syntax. Winona Lake, Indiana: Eisenbrauns. ISBN 0-931464-31-5.
- Yahalom, Joseph (1997). Palestinian Vocalised Piyyut Manuscripts in the Cambridge Genizah Collections. Cambridge University. ISBN 978-0-521-58399-2.
- Yardeni, Ada (1997). The Book of Hebrew Script. Jerusalem: Carta. ISBN 965-220-369-6.
- Yeivin, Israel (1980). Introduction to the Tiberian Masorah. Scholars Press. ISBN 0-89130-373-1.
