= Biblical Hebrew =

Archaic form of the Hebrew language

- Classical Hebrew
- שְֹפַת כְּנַעַן, יְהוּדִית, (לָשׁוֹן) עִבְרִית, לְשׁוֹן הַקֹּדֶשׁ
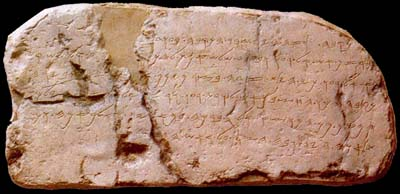
- Siloam inscription at Istanbul Archaeological Museum
- Region: Kingdom of Judah; Kingdom of Israel (Samaria); Hasmonean dynasty; Israelite diaspora (as a liturgical language for Judaism and Samaritanism)
- Era: attested from the 10th century BCE; developed into Mishnaic Hebrew after the Jewish–Roman wars in the 1st century CE
- Language family: Afro-Asiatic: Semitic; West; Central; Northwest; Canaanite; South; Biblical Hebrew
- Early form: Proto-Semitic
- Standard forms: Samaritan; Mishnaic Hebrew †; Medieval Hebrew †; Babylonian †; Ashkenazi; Sephardi
- Writing system: Proto-Sinaitic; Paleo-Hebrew alphabet; Hebrew alphabet; Samaritan alphabet

Language codes
- ISO 639-3: Either: hbo – Ancient Jewish Hebrew (Southern dialect) smp – Samaritan Hebrew (Northern dialect)
- Glottolog: anci1244 Ancient Hebrew sama1313 Samaritan

Biblical Hebrew (Hebrew: עִבְרִית מִקְרָאִית, romanized: ʿiḇrîṯ miqrāʾîṯ or לְשׁוֹן הַמִּקְרָא, ləšôn ham-miqrāʾ), also called Classical Hebrew, is an archaic form of the Hebrew language, a language in the Canaanitic branch of the Semitic languages spoken by the Israelites in the area known as the Land of Israel, roughly west of the Jordan River and east of the Mediterranean Sea. The term ʿiḇrîṯ 'Hebrew' was not used as the language in the Hebrew Bible, which was referred to as שְֹפַת כְּנַעַן śəp̄aṯ kənaʿan 'language of Canaan' or יְהוּדִית Yəhûḏîṯ 'Judean', but was used in Koine Greek and Mishnaic Hebrew texts.

Paleo-Hebrew is attested in inscriptions from about the 10th century BCE, when it was almost identical to Phoenician and other Canaanite languages, and spoken Hebrew persisted as a first language through and beyond the Second Temple period, which ended in 70 CE with the siege of Jerusalem. It eventually developed into Mishnaic Hebrew, which was employed as a second language until the 5th century.

The language of the Hebrew Bible reflects various stages of the Hebrew language in its consonantal skeleton, as well as the Tiberian vocalization system added in the Early Middle Ages by the Masoretes. There is evidence of regional dialectal variation, including differences between the northern Kingdom of Israel and the southern Kingdom of Judah. The consonantal text, called the Masoretic Text ("𝕸"), was transmitted in manuscript form and underwent redaction and modernization in the Second Temple period, but its earliest portions (parts of Amos, Isaiah, Hosea and Micah) can be dated to the late 8th to early 7th centuries BCE.

Biblical Hebrew has several different writing systems. From around the 12th century BCE until the 6th century BCE, writers used the Paleo-Hebrew alphabet. This system was retained by the Samaritans, who use a descendant, the Samaritan script, to this day. However, the Imperial Aramaic alphabet gradually displaced the Paleo-Hebrew alphabet after the Babylonian captivity, and became the source for the current Hebrew alphabet. These scripts lack letters to represent all of the sounds of Biblical Hebrew, although these sounds are reflected in Greek and Latin transcriptions/translations of the time. They initially indicated only consonants, but certain letters, known by the Latin term matres lectionis, became increasingly used to mark vowels. In the Middle Ages, various systems of diacritics were developed to mark the vowels in Hebrew manuscripts; of these, only the Tiberian vocalization is still widely used.

Biblical Hebrew possessed a series of emphatic consonants whose precise articulation (pronunciation) is disputed, likely ejective or possibly pharyngealized. Earlier Biblical Hebrew had three consonants that were not distinguished in the writing system and later merged with other consonants. The stop consonants developed fricative allophones under the influence of Aramaic, and these sounds (the "begadkefat consonants") eventually became marginally phonemic. The pharyngeal and glottal consonants underwent weakening in some regional dialects, as reflected, for example, in the modern Samaritan Hebrew reading tradition. The vowel system of Hebrew underwent changes over time and is reflected differently in Koine Greek and Latin transcriptions, medieval vocalization systems, and modern reading traditions.

Premodern Hebrew had a typically Semitic nonconcatenative morphology, arranging roots into patterns to form words. Biblical Hebrew distinguished two grammatical genders (masculine and feminine), and three numbers (singular, plural, and the uncommon dual). Verbs were marked for voice and mood, and had two conjugations that may have indicated aspect or tense. The tense or aspect of verbs was also influenced by the conjunction ו, the "waw-consecutive" construction. The default word order for Biblical Hebrew was verb–subject–object (unlike Modern Hebrew), and verbs were inflected for the number, gender, and person of their subject. Pronominal suffixes could be appended to verbs to indicate object or nouns to indicate possession, and nouns had special construct states for use in possessive constructions.

== Nomenclature ==
The earliest written sources refer to Biblical Hebrew as שפת כנען 'the language of Canaan'. The Hebrew Bible also calls the language יהודית 'Judaean, Judahite' In the Hellenistic period, Greek writings use the names Hebraios, Hebraïsti and in Mishnaic Hebrew we find עברית 'Hebrew' and לשון עברית 'Hebrew language'. The origin of this term is obscure; suggested origins include the biblical Eber, the ethnonyms ʿApiru, Ḫabiru, and Ḫapiru found in sources from ancient Egypt and West Asia, and a derivation from the root עבר 'to pass', alluding to crossing over the Jordan River. Jews also began referring to Hebrew as לשון הקדש 'the Holy Tongue' in Mishnaic Hebrew.

The term "Classical Hebrew" may encompass all pre-medieval dialects of Hebrew, including Mishnaic Hebrew, or it may be limited to Hebrew contemporary with the Hebrew Bible. The term Biblical Hebrew refers to pre-Mishnaic dialects (sometimes excluding the language of the Dead Sea Scrolls); it may or may not include extra-biblical texts, such as inscriptions like the Siloam inscription, and generally also includes later vocalization traditions for the Hebrew Bible's consonantal text, most commonly the early medieval Tiberian vocalization.

== History ==
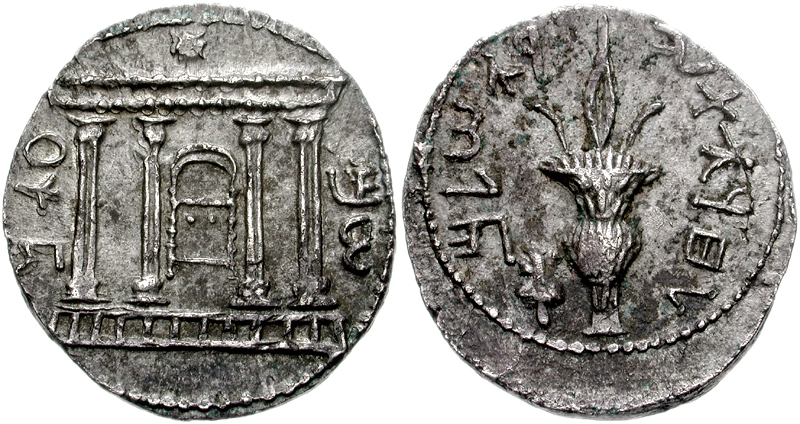
Coin issued during the Bar Kokhba revolt. The Paleo-Hebrew text reads שמעון "Simeon" on the front and לחרות ירושלם "for the freedom of Jerusalem" on the back.

The archeological record for the prehistory of Biblical Hebrew is far more complete than the record of Biblical Hebrew itself. Early Northwest Semitic (ENWS) materials are attested from 2350 BCE to 1200 BCE, the end of the Bronze Age. The Northwest Semitic languages, including Hebrew, differentiated noticeably during the Iron Age (1200–540 BCE), although in its earliest stages Biblical Hebrew was not highly differentiated from Ugaritic and the Canaanite of the Amarna letters.

Hebrew developed during the latter half of the second millennium BCE between the Jordan and the Mediterranean Sea, an area known as Canaan. The Deuteronomic history says the Israelites established a unified kingdom in Canaan at the beginning of the first millennium BCE, which later split into the kingdom of Israel in the north and the kingdom of Judah in the south after a disputed succession.

In 722 BCE, the Neo-Assyrian Empire destroyed Israel and some Israelite elites (עם הארץ) escaped to the Kingdom of Judah, which was made a client state of the Empire. In 586 BCE, the Neo-Babylonian Empire destroyed Judah. The Judahites were exiled, and Solomon's Temple was destroyed.

Later, the Achaemenid Empire made former Judah a province, Yehud Medinata, and permitted the Judahite exiles to return and repopulate the land and aided the rebuilding of the Temple in Jerusalem. According to the Gemara, Hebrew of this Second Temple period was similar to Imperial Aramaic; Hanina bar Hama said that God sent the exiled Jews to Babylon because "their language, Aramaic, is similar to the language of the Torah." (מִפְּנֵי שֶׁקָּרוֹב לְשׁוֹנָם לִלְשׁוֹן תּוֹרָה. Pesahim 87b:20).

Aramaic became the common language in the north, in Galilee and Samaria. Hebrew remained in use in Judah, but the returning exiles brought back Aramaic influence, and Aramaic was used for communicating with other ethnic groups during the Persian period. Alexander the Great conquered Judah in 332 BCE. During the subsequent Hellenistic period, Judea became independent under the Hasmonean dynasty and conquered nearby regions: Perea, Samaria, Idumea, Galilee, and Iturea. Later, the Roman Republic ended their independence, making Herod the Great their ruler, and it was made the province of Judaea in 6 CE.

A revolt against the Romans led to the destruction of the Second Temple in 70 CE, and the second Bar Kokhba revolt in 132–135 led to the purge and expulsion of the Jewish population of Judea, the establishment of a new province of Syria Palaestina, and the rebuilding of Jerusalem as the Roman colonia of Aelia Capitolina.

Roman-era Hebrew, called Tannaitic Hebrew, ceased being spoken about 200 CE and developed into the literary language of the later Mishnaic Hebrew of the Amoraim. Hebrew continued to be used as a literary and liturgical language in the form of Medieval Hebrew. The revival of the Hebrew language as a vernacular began in the 19th century, culminating in Modern Hebrew becoming the official language of Israel. Currently, Classical Hebrew is generally taught in public schools in Israel, and Biblical Hebrew forms are sometimes used in Modern Hebrew literature, much as archaic and biblical constructions are used in English literature. Since Modern Hebrew contains many biblical elements, Biblical Hebrew is fairly intelligible to Modern Hebrew speakers.

The primary source of Biblical Hebrew material is the Hebrew Bible. Epigraphic materials from the area of Israelite territory are written in a form of Hebrew called Inscriptional Hebrew, although this is meagerly attested. According to Waltke & O'Connor, Inscriptional Hebrew "is not strikingly different from the Hebrew preserved in the Masoretic text." The damp climate of Israel caused the rapid deterioration of papyrus and parchment documents, in contrast to the dry environment of Egypt, and the survival of the Hebrew Bible may be attributed to scribal determination in preserving the text through copying. No manuscript of the Hebrew Bible dates to before 400 BCE, although two silver rolls (the Ketef Hinnom scrolls) from the seventh or sixth century BCE show a version of the Priestly Blessing. Vowel and cantillation marks were added to the older consonantal layer of the Bible between 600 CE and the beginning of the 10th century. (Note: This is known because the final redaction of the Talmud, which does not mention these additions, was c. 600 CE, while dated manuscripts with vocalization are found in the beginning of the tenth century. See Blau (2010:7)) The scholars who preserved the pronunciation of the Bibles were known as the Masoretes. The most well-preserved system that was developed, and the only one still in religious use, is the Tiberian vocalization, but both Babylonian and Palestinian vocalizations are also attested. The Palestinian system was preserved mainly in piyyutim, which contain biblical quotations.

== Classification ==
Development of the various fricatives in Hebrew, Aramaic and Arabic
Proto-Semitic	Hebrew	Aramaic	Arabic	Examples			
Proto-Semitic	Hebrew	Aramaic	Arabic	Hebrew	Aramaic	Arabic	meaning
*/ð/ *ḏ	*/z/ ז	*/d/ ד	*/ð/ ذ	זָהָב זָכָר	דְּהָב דְּכָר	ذَهَب ذَكَر	'gold' 'male'
*/z/ *z	*/z/ ז	*/z/ ז	*/z/ ز	מֹאזְנָיִם זְמָן	מֹאזְנָיִן זְמָן	مَوَازِين زَمَن	'scale' 'time'
*/s/ *s	*/s/ ס		*/s/ س	סַכִּין		سِكِّين	'knife'
*/ɬ/ *ś	*/s/ שׂ	*/s/ ס	*/ʃ/ ش	עָשָׂר שַׂהַר	עָסָר סַהַר	عَشْر شَهْر	'ten' 'moon/month'
*/ʃ/ *š	*/ʃ/ שׁ	*/ʃ/ ש	*/s/ س	שָׁנָה שָׁלוֹם	שָנָה שְלָם	سَنَة سَلَام	'year' 'peace'
*/θ/ *ṯ	*/ʃ/ שׁ	*/t/ ת	*/θ/ ث	שָׁלוֹשׁ שְׁתָּיִם	תְּלָת תְּרֵין	ثَلَاث اِثْنَان	'three' 'two'
*/θʼ/ *ṱ	*/sˤ/ צ	*/tˤ/ ט	*/ðˤ/ ظ	צֵל צָהֳרָיִם	טְלָה טֹהֶר	ظِلّ ظُهْر	'shadow' 'noon'
*/ɬʼ/ *ṣ́	*/sˤ/ צ	*/ʕ/ ע	*/dˤ/ ض	אֶרֶץ צָחַק	אֶרַע עֲחַק	أَرْض ضَحِكَ	'land' 'laughed'
*/sʼ/ *ṣ	*/sˤ/ צ	*/sˤ/ צ	*/sˤ/ ص	צָרַח צַבָּר	צְרַח צַבָּר	صَرَخَ صَبْر	'shout' 'watermelon-like plant'
*/χ/ *ḫ	*/ħ/ ח		*/x~χ/ خ	חֲמִשָּׁה צָרַח	חַמְשָה צְרַח	خَمْسَة صَرَخَ	'five' 'shout'
*/ħ/ *ḥ	*/ħ/ ח		*/ħ/ ح	מֶלַח חָלוֹם	מֶלַח חֲלָם	مِلْح حُلْم	'salt' 'dream'
*/ʁ/ *ġ	*/ʕ/ ע		*/ɣ~ʁ/ غ	עוֹרֵב מַעֲרָב	עוֹרָב מַעֲרָב	غُرَاب غَرْب	'raven' 'west'
*/ʕ/ *ʻ	*/ʕ/ ע		*/ʕ/ ع	עֶבֶד שֶׁבַע	עֶבֶד שֶבַע	عَبْد سَبْع	'slave' 'seven'

Biblical Hebrew is a Northwest Semitic language from the Canaanite subgroup.

As Biblical Hebrew evolved from the Proto-Semitic language it underwent a number of consonantal mergers parallel with those in other Canaanite languages. (Note: However it is noteworthy that Akkadian shares many of these sound shifts but is less closely related to Hebrew than Aramaic. See Blau (2010:19)) There is no evidence that these mergers occurred after the adaptation of the Hebrew alphabet. (Note: However, for example, when Old Aramaic borrowed the Canaanite alphabet it still had interdentals, but marked them with what they merged with in Canaanite. For instance 'ox' was written שר but pronounced with an initial /θ/. The same phenomenon also occurred when the Arabs adopted the Nabatean alphabet. See Blau (2010:74–75).)

As a Northwest Semitic language, Hebrew shows the shift of initial */w/ to /j/, a similar independent pronoun system to the other Northwest Semitic languages (with third person pronouns never containing /ʃ/), some archaic forms, such as /naħnu/ 'we', first person singular pronominal suffix -i or -ya, and /n/ commonly preceding pronominal suffixes. Case endings are found in Northwest Semitic languages in the second millennium BCE, but disappear almost totally afterwards. Mimation is absent in singular nouns, but is often retained in the plural, as in Hebrew.

The Northwest Semitic languages formed a dialect continuum in the Iron Age (1200–540 BCE), with Phoenician and Aramaic on each extreme. Hebrew is classed with Phoenician in the Canaanite subgroup, which also includes Ammonite, Edomite, and Moabite. Moabite might be considered a Hebrew dialect, though it possessed distinctive Aramaic features. Although Ugaritic shows a large degree of affinity to Hebrew in poetic structure, vocabulary, and some grammar, it lacks some Canaanite features (like the Canaanite shift and the shift */ð/ > /z/), and its similarities are more likely a result of either contact or preserved archaism.

Hebrew underwent the Canaanite shift, where Proto-Semitic /aː/ tended to shift to /oː/, perhaps when stressed. Hebrew also shares with the Canaanite languages the shifts */ð/ > /z/, */θʼ/ and */ɬʼ/ > /sʼ/, widespread reduction of diphthongs, and full assimilation of non-final /n/ to the following consonant if word final, i.e. בַּת /bat/ from *bint. There is also evidence of a rule of assimilation of /j/ to the following coronal consonant in pre-tonic position, shared by Hebrew, Phoenician and Aramaic: cf בַּיִת báyiṯ, but plural בָּתִּים battím.

Typical Canaanite words in Hebrew include: גַּג "roof" שֻׁלְחָן "table" חַלֹּון "window" יָשָׁן "old (thing)" זָקֵן "old (person)" and גֵּרֵשׁ "expel". Morphological Canaanite features in Hebrew include the masculine plural marker -ם, first person singular pronoun אָנֹכִי, interrogative pronoun מִי, definite article הַ- (appearing in the first millennium BCE), and third person plural feminine verbal marker -ת.

== Eras ==
Biblical Hebrew as preserved in the Hebrew Bible is composed of multiple linguistic layers. The consonantal skeleton of the text is the most ancient, while the cantillation and modern vocalization are later additions reflecting a later stage of the language. These additions were added after 600 CE; Hebrew had already ceased being used as a spoken language around 200 CE. Biblical Hebrew as reflected in the consonantal text of the Bible and in extra-biblical inscriptions may be subdivided by era.

The oldest form of Biblical Hebrew, Archaic Hebrew, is found in poetic sections of the Bible and inscriptions dating to around 1000 BCE, the early monarchic period. This stage is also known as Old Hebrew or Paleo-Hebrew, and is the oldest stratum of Biblical Hebrew. The oldest known artifacts of Archaic Biblical Hebrew are various sections of the Tanakh, including the Song of the Sea (Exodus 15) and the Song of Deborah (Judges 5). Biblical poetry uses a number of distinct lexical items, for example חזה for prose ראה 'see', כביר for גדול 'great'. Some have cognates in other Northwest Semitic languages, for example פעל 'do' and חָרוּץ 'gold' which are common in Canaanite and Ugaritic. Grammatical differences include the use of זה, זוֹ, and זוּ as relative particles, negative בל, and various differences in verbal and pronominal morphology and syntax.

Later pre-exilic Biblical Hebrew (such as is found in prose sections of the Pentateuch, Nevi'im, and some Ketuvim) is known as 'Biblical Hebrew proper' or 'Standard Biblical Hebrew'. This is dated to the period from the 8th to the 6th century BCE. In contrast to Archaic Hebrew, Standard Biblical Hebrew is more consistent in using the definite article ה-, the accusative marker את, distinguishing between simple and waw-consecutive verb forms, and in using particles like אשר and כי rather than asyndeton.

Biblical Hebrew from after the Babylonian exile in 587 BCE is known as 'Late Biblical Hebrew'. Late Biblical Hebrew shows Aramaic influence in phonology, morphology, and lexicon, and this trend is also evident in the later-developed Tiberian vocalization system. (Note: Recent archaeological research suggests that Aramaic may have started to influence Biblical Hebrew already during the pre-exilic era. See Bloch (2017:105))

Qumran Hebrew, attested in the Dead Sea Scrolls from ca. 200 BCE to 70 CE, is a continuation of Late Biblical Hebrew. Qumran Hebrew may be considered an intermediate stage between Biblical Hebrew and Mishnaic Hebrew, though Qumran Hebrew shows its own idiosyncratic dialectal features.

== Dialects ==
Dialect variation in Biblical Hebrew is attested to by the well-known shibboleth incident of Judges 12:6, where Jephthah's forces from Gilead caught Ephraimites trying to cross the Jordan River by making them say שִׁבֹּ֤לֶת šibbóleṯ ('ear of corn') The Ephraimites' identity was given away by their pronunciation: סִבֹּ֤לֶת sibbóleṯ. The apparent conclusion is that the Ephraimite dialect had /s/ for standard /ʃ/. As an alternative explanation, it has been suggested that the proto-Semitic phoneme */θ/, which shifted to /ʃ/ in most dialects of Hebrew, may have been retained in the Hebrew of the Transjordan (Note: As a consequence this would leave open the possibility that other proto-Semitic phonemes (such as */ð/) may have been preserved regionally at one point. See Rendsburg (1997:72)) (however, there is evidence that שִׁבֹּ֤לֶת's Proto-Semitic ancestor had initial consonant š (whence Hebrew /ʃ/), contradicting this theory; for example, שִׁבֹּ֤לֶת's proto-Semitic ancestor has been reconstructed as *šu(n)bul-at-.); or that the Proto-Semitic sibilant *s_{1}, transcribed with šin and traditionally reconstructed as */ʃ/, had been originally */s/ while another sibilant *s_{3}, transcribed with sameḵ and traditionally reconstructed as /s/, had been initially /ts/; later on, a push-type chain shift changed *s_{3} /ts/ to /s/ and pushed s_{1} /s/ to /ʃ/ in many dialects (e.g. Gileadite) but not others (e.g. Ephraimite), where *s_{1} and *s_{3} merged into /s/.

Hebrew, as spoken in the northern Kingdom of Israel, known as Israelian Hebrew, shows phonological, lexical, and grammatical differences from southern dialects. The northern dialect spoken around Samaria shows a more frequent simplification of /aj/ into /eː/ as attested by the Samaria ostraca (8th century BCE), e.g. ין (= /jeːn/ < */jajn/ 'wine'), while the southern or Judean dialect instead adds in an epenthetic vowel /i/, added halfway through the first millennium BCE (יין = /ˈjajin/). (Note: Such contraction is also found in Ugaritic, the El-Amarna letters, and in Phoenician, while the anaptyctic vowel is found in Old Aramaic and Deir Alla. Sáenz-Badillos (1993:44)) The word play in Amos 8:1–2 כְּלוּב קַ֫יִץ... בָּא הַקֵּץ may reflect this: given that Amos was addressing the population of the Northern Kingdom, the vocalization *קֵיץ would be more forceful. Other possible Northern features include use of שֶ- 'who, that', forms like דֵעָה 'to know' rather than דַעַת and infinitives of certain verbs of the form עֲשוֹ 'to do' rather than עֲשוֹת. The Samaria ostraca also show שת for standard שנה 'year', as in Aramaic.

The guttural phonemes /ħ ʕ h ʔ/ merged over time in some dialects. This was found in Dead Sea Scroll Hebrew, but Jerome (d. 420) attested to the existence of contemporaneous Hebrew speakers who still distinguished pharyngeals. Samaritan Hebrew also shows a general attrition of these phonemes, though /ʕ ħ/ are occasionally preserved as [ʕ].

== Orthography ==
Name	Paleo-Hebrew	Block	Samaritan	Phonetic value (Pre-Exilic) (IPA)
Aleph		א	ࠀ	[ʔ]
Beth		ב	ࠁ	[b], [β]
Gimel		ג	ࠂ	[ɡ], [ɣ]
Daleth		ד	ࠃ	[d], [ð]
He	Heh	ה	ࠄ	[h]
Waw		ו	ࠅ	[w]/wᶹ
Zayin		ז	ࠆ	[z]
Heth		ח	ࠇ	[ħ] or [χ]
Teth		ט	ࠈ	[tˤ]
Yodh		י	ࠉ	[j]
Kaph		כך	ࠊ	[k], [x]
Lamedh		ל	ࠋ	[l]
Mem		מם	ࠌ	[m]
Nun		נן	ࠍ	[n]
Samekh		ס	ࠎ	[s]
Ayin		ע	ࠏ	[ʕ] or [ʁ]
Pe		פף	ࠐ	[p], [ɸ]
Tsade		צץ	ࠑ	[sˤ]
Qoph	Qoph	ק	ࠒ	[qˁ]
Resh		ר	ࠓ	[ɾ], [r]
Shin	Shin	ש	ࠔ	[ʃ] or [ɬ͡s]
Taw	Taw	ת	ࠕ	[t], [θ]

The earliest Hebrew writing yet discovered, found at Khirbet Qeiyafa, dates to the 10th century BCE. The 15 cm × 16.5 cm (5.9 in × 6.5 in) trapezoid pottery sherd (ostracon) has five lines of text written in ink in the Proto-Canaanite alphabet (the old form which predates both the Paleo-Hebrew and Phoenician alphabets). The tablet is written from left to right, suggesting that Hebrew writing was still in the formative stage.

The Israelite tribes who settled in the land of Israel used a late form of the Proto-Sinaitic Alphabet (known as Proto-Canaanite when found in Israel) around the 12th century BCE, which developed into Early Phoenician and Early Paleo-Hebrew as found in the Gezer calendar (c. 10th century BCE). This script developed into the Paleo-Hebrew script in the 10th or 9th centuries BCE. The Paleo-Hebrew alphabet's main differences from the Phoenician script were "a curving to the left of the downstrokes in the "long-legged" letter-signs... the consistent use of a Waw with a concave top, [and an] x-shaped Taw." (Note: At times the Moabites, Ammonites, Edomites, and Philistines would also use the Paleo-Hebrew script. See Yardeni (1997:25)) The oldest inscriptions in Paleo-Hebrew script are dated to around the middle of the 9th century BCE, the most famous being the Mesha Stele in the Moabite language (which might be considered a dialect of Hebrew). The ancient Hebrew script was in continuous use until the early 6th century BCE, the end of the First Temple period. In the Second Temple Period the Paleo-Hebrew script gradually fell into disuse, and was completely abandoned among the Jews after the failed Bar Kochba revolt. The Samaritans retained the ancient Hebrew alphabet, which evolved into the modern Samaritan alphabet.

By the end of the First Temple period the Aramaic script, a separate descendant of the Phoenician script, became widespread throughout the region, gradually displacing Paleo-Hebrew. The oldest documents that have been found in the Aramaic Script are fragments of the scrolls of Exodus, Samuel, and Jeremiah found among the Dead Sea scrolls, dating from the late 3rd and early 2nd centuries BCE. It seems that the earlier biblical books were originally written in the Paleo-Hebrew script, while the later books were written directly in the later Assyrian script. Some Qumran texts written in the Assyrian script write the tetragrammaton and some other divine names in Paleo-Hebrew, and this practice is also found in several Jewish-Greek biblical translations. (Note: Though some of these translations wrote the tetragrammaton in the square script See Tov (1992:220)) While spoken Hebrew continued to evolve into Mishnaic Hebrew, A number of regional "book-hand" styles were put into use for the purpose of Torah manuscripts and occasionally other literary works, distinct from the calligraphic styles used mainly for private purposes. The Mizrahi and Ashkenazi book-hand styles were later adapted to printed fonts after the invention of the printing press. The modern Hebrew alphabet, also known as the Assyrian or Square script, appears a descendant of the Aramaic alphabet.

The Phoenician script had dropped five characters by the 12th century BCE, reflecting the language's twenty-two consonantal phonemes. The 22 letters of the Paleo-Hebrew alphabet numbered less than the consonant phonemes of ancient Biblical Hebrew; in particular, the letters ⟨ח, ע, ש⟩ could each mark two different phonemes. After a sound shift the letters ח, ע could only mark one phoneme, but (except in Samaritan Hebrew) ש still marked two. The old Babylonian vocalization system wrote a superscript ס above the ש to indicate it took the value /s/, while the Masoretes added the shin dot to distinguish between the two varieties of the letter.

The original Hebrew alphabet consisted only of consonants, but the letters א, ה, ו, י, also were used to indicate vowels, known as matres lectionis when used in this function. It is thought that this was a product of phonetic development: for instance, *bayt ('house') shifted to בֵּית in construct state but retained its spelling. While no examples of early Hebrew orthography have been found, older Phoenician and Moabite texts show how First Temple period Hebrew would have been written. Phoenician inscriptions from the 10th century BCE do not indicate matres lectiones in the middle or the end of a word, for example לפנ and ז for later לפני and זה, similarly to the Hebrew Gezer Calendar, which has for instance שערמ for שעורים and possibly ירח for ירחו. Matres lectionis were later added word-finally, for instance the Mesha inscription has בללה, בנתי for later בלילה, בניתי; however at this stage they were not yet used word-medially, compare Siloam inscription זדה versus אש (for later איש). The relative terms defective and full/plene are used to refer to alternative spellings of a word with less or more matres lectionis, respectively. (Note: Ktiv male, the Hebrew term for full spelling, has become de rigueur in Modern Hebrew.)

The Hebrew Bible was presumably originally written in a more defective orthography than found in any of the texts known today. Of the extant textual witnesses of the Hebrew Bible, the Masoretic text is generally the most conservative in its use of matres lectionis, with the Samaritan Pentateuch and its forebearers being more full and the Qumran tradition showing the most liberal use of vowel letters. The Masoretic text mostly uses vowel letters for long vowels, showing the tendency to mark all long vowels except for word-internal /aː/. (Note: There are rare-cases of ⟨א⟩ being used medially as a true vowel letter, e.g. דָּאג for the usual דָּג 'fish'. Most cases, however, of ⟨א⟩ being used as a vowel letter are theorized to stem from conservative spelling of words which contained /ʔ/, e.g. רֹאשׁ ('head') from original */raʔʃ/. See Blau (2010:86). There are also a number of exceptions to the rule of marking other long vowels, e.g. when the following syllable contains a vowel letters (like in קֹלֹוֹת 'voices' rather than קוֹלוֹת) or when a vowel letter already marks a consonant (so גּוֹיִם 'nations' rather than *גּוֹיִים). See Blau (2010:6)) In the Qumran tradition, back vowels are usually represented by ⟨ו⟩ whether short or long. ⟨י⟩ is generally used for both long [iː] and [eː] (אבילים, מית), and final [iː] is often written as ־יא in analogy to words like היא, הביא, e.g. כיא, sometimes מיא. ⟨ה⟩ is found finally in forms like חוטה (Tiberian חוטא), קורה (Tiberian קורא) while ⟨א⟩ may be used for an a-quality vowel in final position (e.g. עליהא) and in medial position (e.g. יאתום). Pre-Samaritan and Samaritan texts show full spellings in many categories (e.g. כוחי vs. Masoretic כחי in Genesis 49:3) but only rarely show full spelling of the Qumran type.

Presumably, the vowels of Biblical Hebrew were not indicated in the original text, but various sources attest to them at various stages of development. Greek and Latin transcriptions of words from the biblical text provide early evidence of the nature of Biblical Hebrew vowels. In particular, there is evidence from the rendering of proper nouns in the Koine Greek Septuagint (3rd–2nd centuries BCE) and the Greek alphabet transcription of the Hebrew biblical text contained in the Secunda (3rd century CE, likely a copy of a preexisting text from before 100 BCE (Note: The Secunda is a transliteration of the Hebrew biblical text contained in the Hexapla, a recension of the Old Testament compiled by Origen in the 3rd century CE. There is evidence that the text of the Secunda was written before 100 BCE, despite the later date of the Hexapla. For example, by the time of Origen ⟨η, αι⟩ were pronounced [iː, ɛː], a merger which had already begun around 100 BCE, while in the Secunda they are used to represent Hebrew /eː aj/. See Janssens (1982:14))). In the 7th and 8th centuries CE various systems of vocalic notation were developed to indicate vowels in the biblical text. The most prominent, best preserved, and the only system still in use, is the Tiberian vocalization system, created by scholars known as Masoretes around 850 CE. There are also various extant manuscripts making use of less common vocalization systems (Babylonian and Palestinian), known as superlinear vocalizations because their vocalization marks are placed above the letters. (Note: The Palestinian system has two main subtypes and shows great variation. Blau (2010:7) The Babylonian vocalization occurred in two main types (simple / einfach and complex / kompliziert), with various subgroups differing as to their affinity with the Tiberian tradition. Sáenz-Badillos (1993:97–99)) (Note: In the Babylonian and Palestinian systems only the most important vowels were written. See Blau (2010:118)) In addition, the Samaritan reading tradition is independent of these systems and was occasionally notated with a separate vocalization system. (Note: Almost all vocalized manuscripts use the Masoretic Text. However, there are some vocalized Samaritan manuscripts from the Middle Ages. See Tov (1992:40)) These systems often record vowels at different stages of historical development; for example, the name of the Judge Samson is recorded in Greek as Σαμψών Sampsōn with the first vowel as /a/, while Tiberian שִמְשוֹן /ʃimʃon/ with /i/ shows the effect of the law of attenuation whereby /a/ in closed unstressed syllables became /i/. All of these systems together are used to reconstruct the original vocalization of Biblical Hebrew.

At an early stage, in documents written in the paleo-Hebrew script, words were divided by short vertical lines and later by dots, as reflected by the Mesha Stone, the Siloam inscription, the Ophel inscription, and paleo-Hebrew script documents from Qumran. Word division was not used in Phoenician inscriptions; however, there is no direct evidence for biblical texts being written without word division, as suggested by Nahmanides in his introduction to the Torah. Word division using spaces was commonly used from the beginning of the 7th century BCE for documents in the Aramaic script. In addition to marking vowels, the Tiberian system also uses cantillation marks, which serve to mark word stress, semantic structure, and the musical motifs used in formal recitation of the text.

While the Babylonian and Palestinian reading traditions are extinct, various other systems of pronunciation have evolved over time, notably the Yemenite, Sephardi, Ashkenazi, and Samaritan traditions. Modern Hebrew pronunciation is also used by some to read biblical texts. The modern reading traditions do not stem solely from the Tiberian system; for instance, the Sephardic tradition's distinction between qamatz gadol and qatan is likely pre-Tiberian. However, the only orthographic system used to mark vowels is the Tiberian vocalization.

== Phonology ==
The phonology as reconstructed for Biblical Hebrew is as follows:

=== Consonants ===
Biblical Hebrew Consonants
		Labial	Coronal				Dorsal			Pharyn- geal	Glottal
		Labial	Dental	Alveolar	Lateral	Post- alv.	Palatal	Velar	Uvular	Pharyn- geal	Glottal
Stops	voiceless	p		t				k	q		ʔ
Stops	voiced	b		d				g			
Stops	emphatic			tˤ							
Fricatives	voiceless	ɸ	θ	s	ɬ	ʃ		x	χ	ħ	h
Fricatives	voiced	β	ð	z				ɣ	ʁ	ʕ	
Fricatives	emphatic			sˤ							
Nasals		m		n							
Approximants		w/ʋ			l		j				
Trill				r							
Legend: Stable consonants Consonants lost during Biblical Hebrew; Consonants gained during Biblical Hebrew

The phonetic nature of some Biblical Hebrew consonants is disputed. The so-called "emphatics" were likely pharyngealized, but possibly velarized. The pharyngealization of emphatic consonants is viewed as a Central Semitic innovation.

Some argue that /s, z, sˤ/ were affricated ([ts, dz, tsˤ]), but Egyptian starts using s in place of earlier ṯ to represent Canaanite s around 1000 BC. It is likely that Canaanite was already dialectally split by that time, and the northern Early Phoenician dialect that the Greeks were in contact with could have preserved the affricate pronunciation until c. 800 BC at least, unlike the more southern Canaanite dialects (like Hebrew) that the Egyptians were in contact with, so that there is no contradiction within this argument.

Originally, the Hebrew letters ⟨ח⟩ and ⟨ע⟩ each represented two possible phonemes, uvular and pharyngeal, with the distinction unmarked in Hebrew orthography. However, the uvular phonemes /χ/ ח and /ʁ/ ע merged with their pharyngeal counterparts /ħ/ ח and /ʕ/ ע respectively c. 200 BCE.

This is observed by noting the preservation of the double phonemes of each letter in one Sephardic reading tradition, and by noting that these phonemes are distinguished consistently in the Septuagint of the Pentateuch (e.g. Isaac יצחק Yīṣḥāq = Ἰσαάκ versus Rachel רחל Rāḫēl = Ῥαχήλ), but this becomes more sporadic in later books and is generally absent in translations of Ezra and Nehemiah.

The phoneme /ɬ/, is also not directly indicated by Hebrew orthography but is clearly attested by later developments: It is written with ⟨ש⟩ (also used for /ʃ/) but later merged with /s/ (normally indicated with ⟨ס⟩). As a result, three etymologically distinct phonemes can be distinguished through a combination of spelling and pronunciation: /s/ written ⟨ס⟩, /ʃ/ written ⟨ש⟩, and /ś/ (pronounced /ɬ/ but written ⟨ש⟩). The specific pronunciation of /ś/ as [ɬ] is based on comparative evidence (/ɬ/ is the corresponding Proto-Semitic phoneme and still attested in Modern South Arabian languages as well as early borrowings (e.g. balsam < Greek balsamon < Hebrew baśam). /ɬ/ began merging with /s/ in Late Biblical Hebrew, as indicated by interchange of orthographic ⟨ש⟩ and ⟨ס⟩, possibly under the influence of Aramaic, and this became the rule in Mishnaic Hebrew. In all Jewish reading traditions /ɬ/ and /s/ have merged completely; however in Samaritan Hebrew /ɬ/ has instead merged with /ʃ/.

Allophonic spirantization of /b ɡ d k p t/ to [v ɣ ð x f θ] (known as begadkefat spirantization) developed sometime during the lifetime of Biblical Hebrew under the influence of Aramaic. (Note: Or perhaps Hurrian, but this is unlikely See Dolgopolsky (1999:72–3).) This probably happened after the original Old Aramaic phonemes /θ, ð/ disappeared in the 7th century BCE, and most likely occurred after the loss of Hebrew /χ, ʁ/ c. 200 BCE. (Note: According to the generally accepted view, it is unlikely begadkefat spirantization occurred before the merger of /χ, ʁ/ and /ħ, ʕ/, or else [x, χ] and [ɣ, ʁ] would have to be contrastive, which is cross-linguistically rare. However Blau argues that it is possible that lenited /k/ and /χ/ could coexist even if pronounced identically, since one would be recognized as an alternating allophone (as apparently is the case in Nestorian Syriac). See Blau (2010:56).) It is known to have occurred in Hebrew by the 2nd century CE. After a certain point this alternation became contrastive in word-medial and final position (though bearing low functional load), but in word-initial position they remained allophonic. This is evidenced both by the Tiberian vocalization's consistent use of word-initial spirants after a vowel in sandhi, as well as Saadia Gaon's attestation to the use of this alternation in Tiberian Aramaic at the beginning of the 10th century CE.

The Dead Sea scrolls show evidence of confusion of the phonemes /ħ ʕ h ʔ/, e.g. חמר ħmr for Masoretic אָמַר /ʔɔˈmar/ 'he said'. However the testimony of Jerome indicates that this was a regionalism and not universal. Confusion of gutturals was also attested in later Mishnaic Hebrew and Aramaic (see Eruvin 53b). In Samaritan Hebrew, /ʔ ħ h ʕ/ have generally all merged, either into /ʔ/, a glide /w/ or /j/, or by vanishing completely (often creating a long vowel), except that original /ʕ ħ/ sometimes have reflex /ʕ/ before /a ɒ/.

Geminate consonants are phonemically contrastive in Biblical Hebrew. In the Secunda /w j z/ are never geminate. In the Tiberian tradition /ħ ʕ h ʔ r/ cannot be geminate; historically first /r ʔ/ degeminated, followed by /ʕ/, /h/, and finally /ħ/, as evidenced by changes in the quality of the preceding vowel. (Note: The vowel before originally geminate /r ʔ/ usually shows compensatory lengthening, e.g. הָאָב /hɔˈʔɔv/ 'the father' < /*haʔːab/; with /ʕ/ preceding /*i/ tends to remain short; with /h/ original /*a/ also remains short, and /ħ/ generally does not cause compensatory lengthening, e.g. יְרַחֵם ('he will have compassion'). See Blau (2010:81–83))

Hebrew consonant correspondences
Proto-Semitic	Language			
Proto-Semitic	Hebrew		Aramaic	Arabic
Proto-Semitic	Jewish	Samaritanּ	Aramaic	Arabic
*/p/	*/ɸ/ (normally) פף */p/ (syllable-initially, after closed syllables, geminated) פּ	*/f/ ࠐ	*/ɸ/ (normally) פף */p/ (syllable-initially, after closed syllables, geminated) פּ	*/f/ ف
*/b/	*/β/ (normally) ב */b/ (syllable-initially, after closed syllables, geminated) בּ	*/b/ ࠁ	*/β/ (normally) ב */b/ (syllable-initially, after closed syllables, geminated) בּ	*/b/ ب
*/t/	*/θ/ (normally) ת */t/ (syllable-initially, after closed syllables, geminated) תּ	*/t/ ࠕ	*/θ/ (normally) ת */t/ (syllable-initially, after closed syllables, geminated) תּ	*/t/ ت
*/θ/ ṯ	*/ʃ/ שׁ	*/ʃ/ ࠔ	*/θ/ (normally) ת */t/ (syllable-initially, after closed syllables, geminated) תּ	*/θ/ ث
*/ʃ/ š	*/ʃ/ שׁ	*/ʃ/ ࠔ	*/ʃ/ ש	*/s/ س
*/ɬ/ ś	*/s/ שׂ	*/ʃ/ ࠔ	*/s/ ס	*/ʃ/ ش
*/θʼ/ ṯ̣	*/sˤ/ צץ	*/sˤ/ ࠑ	*/tˤ/ ט	*/ðˤ/ ظ
*/sʼ/, */t͡sʼ/ ṣ	*/sˤ/ צץ	*/sˤ/ ࠑ	*/sˤ/ צץ	*/sˤ/ ص
*/ɬʼ/ ṣ́	*/sˤ/ צץ	*/sˤ/ ࠑ	*/ʕ/ ע	*/dˤ/ ض
*/d/	*/ð/ (normally) ד */d/ (syllable-initially, after closed syllables, geminated) דּ	*/d/ ࠃ	*/ð/ (normally) ד */d/ (syllable-initially, after closed syllables, geminated) דּ	*/d/ د
*/ð/ ḏ	*/z/ ז	*/z/ ࠆ	*/ð/ (normally) ד */d/ (syllable-initially, after closed syllables, geminated) דּ	*/ð/ ذ
*/z/, */d͡z/ z	*/z/ ז	*/z/ ࠆ	*/z/ ז	*/z/ ز
*/k/	*/x/ (normally) כך */k/ (syllable-initially, after closed syllables, geminated) כּ	*/k/ ࠊ	*/x/ (normally) כך */k/ (syllable-initially, after closed syllables, geminated) כּ	*/k/ ك
*/χ/ ḫ	*/ħ/ ח	silent (normally) ࠇ */ʔ~ʕ/ (syllable-initially) ࠇ	*/ħ/ ח	*/χ/ خ
*/ħ/ ḥ	*/ħ/ ח	silent (normally) ࠇ */ʔ~ʕ/ (syllable-initially) ࠇ	*/ħ/ ח	*/ħ/ ح
*/g/	*/ɣ/ (normally) ג */g/ (syllable-initially, after closed syllables, geminated) גּ	*/g/ ࠂ	*/ɣ/ (normally) ג */g/ (syllable-initially, after closed syllables, geminated) גּ	*/d͡ʒ/ ج
*/ʁ/ ġ	*/ʕ/ ע	silent (normally) ࠏ */ʔ~ʕ/ (syllable-initially) ࠏ	*/ʕ/ ע	*/ʁ/ غ
*/ʕ/ ʻ	*/ʕ/ ע	silent (normally) ࠏ */ʔ~ʕ/ (syllable-initially) ࠏ	*/ʕ/ ע	*/ʕ/ ع
*/w/	*/w ~ ʋ/ (normally) ו */j/ (word-initially, except in ו- "and") י	*/b/ (normally) ࠅ */j/ (word-initially, except in -ࠅ "and") ࠉ	*/w/ (normally) ו */j/ (word-initially, except in ו- "and") י	*/w/ و

=== Vowels ===
The vowel system of Hebrew has changed considerably over time. The following vowels are those reconstructed for the earliest stage of Hebrew, those attested by the Secunda, those of the various vocalization traditions (Tiberian and varieties of Babylonian and Palestinian), and those of the Samaritan tradition, with vowels absent in some traditions color-coded.

Proto-Hebrew
Biblical Hebrew
Secunda Hebrew
Tiberian, Babylonian, and Palestinian Hebrew
Samaritan Hebrew

	Front	Back
Close	i iː	u uː
Close-mid	(eː)	oː
Open	a aː	

	Front	Back
Close	i^{1} iː	u^{2} uː
Close-mid	eː^{3}	oː
Open	a^{4} aː^{5}	

	Front	Back
Close	iː	uː
Close-mid	e eː	o oː
Open	a^{1} aː	
Reduced	ə	

	Front	Back
Close	i	u
Close-mid	e	o
Open-mid	ɛ^{1}	ɔ^{2}
Open	a	
Reduced	ă^{3} ɔ̆^{3} (ɛ̆)^{3} ə^{3}	

	Front	Back
Close	i iː	u uː
Mid	e eː	(o)^{1}
Open	a aː	ɒ ɒː
Reduced	(ə)^{2}	

possible allophones
1. /i/ – [i] [ɪ] [ẹ/ɛ]
2. /u/ – [o̞] [o] [ʊ] [u]
3. /eː/ – [ẹː] [ɛː]
4. /a/ – [ɛ] [a] [ɐ]
5. /aː/ – [aː] [ɐː]
1. possibly pronounced [æ], as the orthography alternates ⟨α⟩ and ⟨ε⟩
1. merges with /e/ in the Palestinian tradition and with /a/ in the Babylonian tradition (Note: In this respect the Palestinian tradition corresponds to the modern Sephardi pronunciation, and the Babylonian tradition to the modern Yemenite pronunciation.) (Note: While the vowels /a e i ɔ o u/ certainly have phonemic status in the Tiberian tradition, /ɛ/ has phonemic value in final stressed position but in other positions it may reflect loss of the opposition /a ː i/. See Blau (2010:111–112))
2. merges with /a/ or /o/ in the Palestinian tradition
3. The Tiberian tradition has the reduced vowel phonemes /ă ɔ̆/ and marginal /ɛ̆/, while Palestinian and Babylonian have one, /ə/ (pronounced as [ɛ] in later Palestinian Hebrew)
1. /u/ and /o/ only contrast in open post-tonic syllables, e.g. ידו /jedu/ ('his hand') ידיו /jedo/ ('his hands'), where /o/ stems from a contracted diphthong. In other environments, /o/ appears in closed syllables and /u/ in open syllables, e.g. דור /dor/ דורות /durot/.
2. results from both /i/ and /e/ in closed post-tonic syllables

==== Sound changes ====
The following sections present the vowel changes that Biblical Hebrew underwent, in approximate chronological order.

===== Proto-Central-Semitic =====
Proto-Semitic is the ancestral language of all the Semitic languages, and in traditional reconstructions possessed 29 consonants; 6 monophthong vowels, consisting of three qualities and two lengths, */a aː i iː u uː/, in which the long vowels occurred only in open syllables; and two diphthongs */aj aw/. The stress system of Proto-Semitic is unknown but it is commonly described as being much like the system of Classical Latin or the modern pronunciation of Classical Arabic: If the penultimate (second last) syllable is light (has a short vowel followed by a single consonant), stress goes on the antepenult (third to last); otherwise, it goes on the penult.

Various changes, mostly in morphology, took place between Proto-Semitic and Proto-Central-Semitic, the language at the root of the Central Semitic languages. The phonemic system was inherited essentially unchanged, but the emphatic consonants may have changed their realization in Central Semitic from ejectives to pharyngealized consonants.

The morphology of Proto-Central-Semitic shows significant changes compared with Proto-Semitic, especially in its verbs, and is much like in Classical Arabic. Nouns in the singular were usually declined in three cases: /-u/ (nominative), /-a/ (accusative) or /-i/ (genitive). In some circumstances (but never in the construct state), nouns also took a final nasal after the case ending: nunation (final /-n/) occurred in some languages, mimation (final /-m/) in others. The original meaning of this marker is uncertain. In Classical Arabic, final /-n/ on nouns indicates indefiniteness and disappears when the noun is preceded by a definite article or otherwise becomes definite in meaning. In other languages, final /-n/ may be present whenever a noun is not in the construct state. Old Canaanite had mimation, of uncertain meaning, in an occurrence of the word urušalemim (Jerusalem) as given in an Egyptian transcription.

Broken plural forms in Arabic are declined like singulars, and often take singular agreement as well. Dual and "strong plural" forms use endings with a long vowel or diphthong, declined in only two cases: nominative and objective (combination accusative/genitive), with the objective form often becoming the default one after the loss of case endings. Both Hebrew and Arabic had a special form of nunation/mimation that co-occurred with the dual and masculine sound plural endings whenever the noun was not in the construct state. The endings were felt as an inherent part of the ending and, as a result, are still used. Examples are Arabic strong masculine plural -ūna (nominative), -īna (objective), and dual endings -āni (nominative), -ayni (objective); corresponding construct-state endings are -ū, -ī (strong masculine plural), -ā, -ay (dual). (The strong feminine endings in Classical Arabic are -ātu nominative, -āti objective, marked with a singular-style -n nunation in the indefinite state only.)

If Hebrew had at some point had the broken plural, any vestigial forms that may remain have been extended with the strong plural endings. The dual and strong plural endings were likely much like the Arabic forms given above at one point, with only the objective-case forms ultimately surviving. For example, dual -ayim is probably from *-aymi with an extended mimation ending (cf. Arabic -ayni above), while dual construct -ē is from *-ay without mimation. Similarly, -īm < *-īma, -ōt < *-āti. (Expected plural construct state *-ī was replaced by dual -ē.)

Feminine nouns at this point ended in a suffix /-at-/ or /-t-/ in case endings. When the ending is final due to the loss or absence of the case ending, it is replaced with /-ah/ and then /-aː/ in both Hebrew and Arabic. The final /t/ consonant therefore is silent in the absolute state, but becomes /t/ again in the construct state and when these words take suffixes, e.g. תֹורָה /toːraː/ "law" becomes תֹורַת /toːrat/ "law of", and תֹורָתְךָ /toːraːtəkaː/ "your law", etc. (This is equivalent to the Arabic letter tāʼ marbūṭah ة, a modified final form of the letter hāʾ ه, which indicates this same phoneme shifting. Only its pronunciation varies between construct and absolute state.)

===== Potential Canaanite shift =====
Hebrew shows certain aspects of the Canaanite shift whereby */aː/ often shifted to /oː/; the conditions of this shift are disputed. (Note: In fact, its scope of application is different in Samaritan and Tiberian Hebrew (e.g. פה 'here' Tiberian /po/ vs. Samaritan /fa/), see Ben-Ḥayyim (2000:83–86). Even in Tiberian Hebrew doublets are found, e.g. /kʼanːo(ʔ?)/ = /kʼanːɔ(ʔ?)/ ('zealous'). See Steiner (1997:147)) This shift had occurred by the 14th century BCE, as demonstrated by its presence in the Amarna letters (c. 1365 BCE).

===== Proto-Hebrew =====
As a result of the Canaanite shift, the Proto-Hebrew vowel system is reconstructed as */a aː oː i iː u uː/ (and possibly rare */eː/). Furthermore, stress at this point appears to have shifted so that it was consistently on the penultimate (next to last) syllable, and was still non-phonemic. The predominant final stress of Biblical Hebrew was a result of loss of final unstressed vowels and a shift away from remaining open syllables (see below).

===== Loss of final unstressed vowels =====
Final unstressed short vowels dropped out in most words, making it possible for long vowels to occur in closed syllables. This appears to have proceeded in two steps:

1. Final short mood, etc. markers dropped in verbal forms.
2. Final short case markers dropped in nominal forms.

Vowel lengthening in stressed, open syllables occurred between the two steps, with the result that short vowels at the beginning of an original -VCV ending lengthened in nouns but not verbs. This is most noticeable with short /a/: e.g. *dabara ('word' acc.') > /dɔˈvɔr/ but *kataba ('he wrote') > /kɔˈθav/.

The dropping of final short vowels in verb forms tended to erase mood distinctions, but also some gender distinctions; however, unexpected vowel lengthening occurred in many situations to preserve the distinctions. For example, in the suffix conjugation, first-singular *-tu appears to have been remade into *-tī already by Proto-Hebrew on the basis of possessive -ī (likewise first singular personal pronoun *ʔana became *ʔanī).

Similarly, in the second-singular, inherited *-ta -ti competed with lengthened *-tā -tī for masculine and feminine forms. The expected result would be -t or -tā for masculine, -t or -tī for feminine, and in fact both variants of both forms are found in the Bible (with -h marking the long -ā and -y marking the long -ī). The situation appears to have been quite fluid for several centuries, with -t and -tā/tī forms found in competition both in writing and in speech (cf. the Secunda (Hexapla) of Origen, which records both pronunciations, although quite often in disagreement with the written form as passed down to us). Ultimately, writing stabilized on the shorter -t for both genders, while speech chose feminine -t but masculine -tā. This is the reason for the unexpected qamatz vowel written under the final letter of such words.

The exact same process affected possessive *-ka ('your' masc. sing.) and *-ki ('your' fem. sing.), and personal pronouns *ʔanta, *ʔanti, with the same split into shorter and longer forms and the same ultimate resolution.

===== Short vowel lengthening (esp. pretonic), lowering =====
The short vowels */a i u/ tended to lengthen in various positions.

- First, short vowels lengthened in an open syllable in pretonic position (i.e. directly before the stressed syllable).
- Later, short vowels lengthened in stressed open syllables. (Note: Parallels to Aramaic syllable structure suggest pretonic lengthening may have occurred in the Second Temple period. See Blau (2010:128–129))

In the process of lengthening, the high vowels were lowered. In the Secunda, the lengthened reflexes of /a i u/ are /aː eː oː/; when kept short they generally have reflexes /a e o/. (Note: Long /aː eː oː/ were written as ⟨α η ω⟩, while short /a e o/ were written ⟨α/ε ε ο⟩. This length distinction is also found in the LXX. See Blau (2010:110–111), Janssens (1982:54), and Dolgopolsky (1999:14)) (Note: In the Secunda /*a *i *u/ are preserved as short in syllables closed by two consonants and in the third syllable before the stress. See Janssens (1982:54, 58–59))

===== Reduction of short open stressed syllables =====
Stressed open syllables with a short vowel (i.e. syllables consisting of a short vowel followed by a consonant and another vowel) had the vowel reduced to /ə/ and the stressed moved one syllable later in the word (usually to the last syllable of the word). Presumably, stress was originally penultimate and loss of final short vowels made many words have final stress. However, in this case, words whose final syllable had a long vowel or ended with a consonant were unaffected and still had penultimate stress at this point except in pausal position, where the penultimate stress is preserved, and vowel lengthening rather than reduction occurs.

The previous three changes occurred in a complex, interlocking fashion:

1. Shift of stress to be universally penultimate.
2. Loss of final short vowels in verbs, pre-stress lengthening in open syllables. Pre-stress lengthening/lowering becomes a surface filter that remains as a rule in the language, automatically affected any new short vowels in open syllables as they appear (but ultra-short vowels are unaffected).
3. Stress movement from light syllable to following heavy syllable when not in pausa, with newly unstressed light syllable reducing the schwa.
4. Tonic lengthening/lowering in open syllables.
5. Loss of final short vowels in nouns.

Examples:

Possible derivation of some nominal/verbal forms
	'killing/killer (masc. sg.)'	'he killed'	'she killed'	'they killed'	'they killed' (pausa)	'you (masc. sg.) kill'	'you (fem. sg.) kill'
Proto-Central-Semitic	*ˈqaːṭilu	*ˈqaṭala	*ˈqaṭalat	*ˈqaṭaluː	*ˈqaṭaluː	*ˈtaqṭulu	*taqṭuˈliː(na)
Pre-Hebrew	*ˈqaːṭilu	*ˈqaṭala	*ˈqaṭalat	*ˈqaṭaluː	*ˈqaṭaluː	*ˈtaqṭulu	*ˈtaqṭuliː
Canaanite shift	*ˈqoːṭilu	—	—	—	—	—	—
Penultimate stress	*qoːˈṭilu	*qaˈṭala	*qaˈṭalat	*qaˈṭaluː	*qaˈṭaluː	*taqˈṭulu	*taqˈṭuliː
Final short vowel loss (verb)	—	*qaˈṭal	—	—	—	*taqˈṭul	—
Pre-tonic lengthening	—	*qaːˈṭal	*qaːˈṭalat	*qaːˈṭaluː	*qaːˈṭaluː	—	—
Stress shift / de-stressed reduction	—	—	*qaːṭəˈlat	*qaːṭəˈluː	—	—	*taqṭəˈliː
Tonic lengthening/lowering	*qoːˈṭeːlu	—	—	—	*qaːˈṭaːluː	—	—
Final short vowel loss (noun)	*qoːˈṭeːl	—	—	—	—	—	—
Feminine /-at/ > /aː/	—	—	*qaːṭəˈlaː	—	—	—	—
Short vowel lowering	—	—	—	—	—	*taqˈṭol	—
Law of attenuation	—	—	—	—	—	*tiqˈṭol	*tiqṭəˈliː
Tiberian /aː/ > /ɔː/	*qoːˈṭeːl	*qɔːˈṭal	*qɔːṭəˈlɔː	*qɔːṭəˈluː	*qɔːˈṭɔːluː	—	—
Loss of phonemic vowel length; attested Tiberian form	qoˈṭel	qɔˈṭal	qɔṭəˈlɔ	qɔṭəˈlu	qɔˈṭɔlu	tiqˈṭol	tiqṭəˈli

Many, perhaps most, Hebrew words with a schwa directly before a final stress are due to this stress shift.

This sound change shifted many more originally penultimate-stressed words to have final stress. The above changes can be seen to divide words into a number of main classes based on stress and syllable properties:

1. Proto-Hebrew words with an open penult and short-vowel ending: Become final-stressed (e.g. /qɔˈṭal/ ('he killed') < PHeb. /qaˈṭala/).
2. Proto-Hebrew words with a closed penult and short-vowel ending: Become penultimate due to segholate rule (e.g. /ˈmɛlɛx/ ('king') < */malku/).
3. Proto-Hebrew words with an open short penult and longer ending: Become final-stressed due to stress shift (e.g. /qɔṭəˈlu/ ('they killed') < PHeb. /qaˈṭaluː/).
4. Proto-Hebrew words with a closed penult and longer ending: Remain penultimate (e.g. /qɔˈṭalti/ ('I killed') < PHeb. /qaˈṭaltiː/).
5. Proto-Hebrew words with an open long penult and longer ending: ???

===== Pre-stress reduction of short vowel =====
*/a i u/ were reduced to /ə/ in the second syllable before the stress, and occasionally reduced rather than lengthened in pretonic position, especially when initial (e.g. σεμω = שמו /ʃəˈmo/ 'his name'). (Note: The Secunda also has a few cases of pretonic gemination. See Janssens (1982:119).) Thus the vowel system of the Secunda was /a e eː iː o oː uː ə/.

===== Later developments =====
The later Jewish traditions (Tiberian, Babylonian, Palestinian) show similar vowel developments. By the Tiberian time, all short vowels in stressed syllables and open pretonic lengthened, making vowel length allophonic. (Note: In fact, first all stressed vowels were lengthened in pause, see Janssens (1982:58–59). This can be seen by forms like Tiberian כַּף /kaf/ < */kaf/, pausal כָּף /kɔf/ < */kɔːf/ < */kaːf/ < */kaf/. The shift in Tiberian Hebrew of */aː/ > */ɔː/ occurred after this lengthening, but before the loss of phonemicity of length (since words like ירחם with allophonically long [aː] do not show this shift).) Vowels in open or stressed syllables had allophonic length (e.g. /a/ in יְרַחֵם /jəraˈħem/ [jəraːˈħeːm] ('he will have mercy') < previously short [jəraˈħeːm] < [jəraħˈħeːm] by Tiberian degemination of /ħ/ < PSem */juraħˈħimu/). (Note: This is attested to by the testimony of Joseph Qimḥi (12th century) and by medieval Arabic transcriptions, see Janssens (1982:54–56). There is also possible evidence from the cantillation marks' behavior and Babylonian pataḥ, see Blau (2010:82).) The Babylonian and Palestinian vocalizations systems also do not mark vowel length. In the Tiberian and Babylonian systems, */aː/ and lengthened */a/ become the back vowel /ɔ/. In unaccented closed syllables, */i u/ become /ɛ⁓i ɔ⁓u/ (Tiberian), /a⁓i u/ (Babylonian), or /e⁓i o⁓u/ (Palestinian) – generally becoming the second vowel before geminates (e.g. לִבִּי) and the first otherwise. (Note: The Palestinian reflexes of Tiberian /ɔ/ (/a/ and /o/) thus reflect the qamatz gadol-qamatz qatan distinction.) In the Tiberian tradition pretonic vowels are reduced more commonly than in the Secunda. It does not occur for /*a/, but is occasional for /*i/ (e.g. מסמְרים /masməˈrim/ 'nails' < */masmiriːm/), and is common for /*u/ (e.g. רְחוֹב /rəˈħoβ 'open place' < */ruħaːb/). In Tiberian Hebrew pretonic /*u/ is most commonly preserved by geminating the following consonant, e.g. אדֻמּים /ăðumˈmim/ ('red' pl.) (cf. /ăˈðom/ 'red' sg.); this pretonic gemination is also found in some forms with other vowels like אַסִּיר⁓אָסִיר /ɔˈsir/⁓/asˈsir/ ('prisoner').

The Babylonian and Palestinian systems have only one reduced vowel phoneme /ə/ like the Secunda, though in Palestinian Hebrew it developed the pronunciation [ɛ]. However the Tiberian tradition possesses three reduced vowels /ă ɔ̆ ɛ̆/ of which /ɛ̆/ has questionable phonemicity. (Note: See אֳנִי /ɔ̆ˈni/ ('ships') אֲנִי /ăˈni/ ('I'), חֳלִי /ħɔ̆ˈli/ ('sickness') חֲלִי /ħăˈli/ ('ornament'), עֲלִי /ʕăˈli/ ('ascend!') (Num 21:17) and בַּעֱלִי /baʕɛ̆ˈli/ ('[with the] pestle'; Prov 27:22). Blau (2010:117–118) /ɛ̆/ alternates with /ă/ frequently and rarely contrasts with it, e.g. אֱדוֹם /ʔɛ̆ˈðom/ ('Edom') versus אֲדֹמִי /ʔăðoˈmi/ ('Edomite'). Blau (2010:117–118) /ɔ̆/ is clearly phonemic but bears minimal functional load. Sáenz-Badillos (1993:110) /ă/ is written both with mobile šwa ⟨‌ְ ⟩ and hataf patah ⟨‌ֲ ⟩. Blau (2010:117)) /ă/ under a non-guttural letter was pronounced as an ultrashort copy of the following vowel before a guttural, e.g. וּבָקְעָה [uvɔqɔ̆ˈʕɔ], and as [ĭ] preceding /j/, e.g. תְדֵמְּיוּ֫נִי [θăðamːĭˈjuni], but was always pronounced as [ă] under gutturals, e.g. שָחֲחו, חֲיִי. When reduced, etymological */a i u/ become /ă ɛ̆⁓ă ɔ̆/ under gutturals (e.g. אֲמרתם 'you [mp.] said' cf. אָמר 'he said'), and generally /ă/ under non-gutturals, but */u/ > /ɔ̆/ (and rarely */i/ > /ɛ̆/) may still occur, especially after stops (or their spirantized counterparts) and /sʼ ʃ/ (e.g. דֳּמִי /dɔ̆ˈmi/). Samaritan and Qumran Hebrew have full vowels in place of the reduced vowels of Tiberian Hebrew.

Samaritan Hebrew also does not reflect etymological vowel length; however the elision of guttural consonants has created new phonemic vowel length, e.g. /rɒb/ רב ('great') vs. /rɒːb/ רחב ('wide'). Samaritan Hebrew vowels are allophonically lengthened (to a lesser degree) in open syllables, e.g. המצרי [ammisˤriˑ], היא [iˑ], though this is less strong in post-tonic vowels. Pretonic gemination is also found in Samaritan Hebrew, but not always in the same locations as in Tiberian Hebrew, e.g. גמלים TH /ɡămalːim/ SH /ɡɒmɒləm/; שלמים TH /ʃălɔmim/ SH /ʃelamːəm/. While Proto-Hebrew long vowels usually retain their vowel quality in the later traditions of Hebrew, in Samaritan Hebrew */iː/ may have reflex /e/ in closed stressed syllables, e.g. דין /den/, */aː/ may become either /a/ or /ɒ/, and */oː/ > /u/. The reduced vowels of the other traditions appear as full vowels, though there may be evidence that Samaritan Hebrew once had similar vowel reduction. Samaritan /ə/ results from the neutralization of the distinction between /i/ and /e/ in closed post-tonic syllables, e.g. /bit/ בית ('house') /abbət/ הבית ('the house') /ɡer/ גר /aɡɡər/ הגר.

Various more specific conditioned shifts of vowel quality have also occurred. Diphthongs were frequently monophthongized, but the scope and results of this shift varied among dialects. In particular, the Samaria ostraca show /jeːn/ < */jajn/ < */wajn/ (Note: For /w-/ > /j-/, see above. The Semitic form */wajn-/ was borrowed into Proto-Indo-European as */wojn-om/, eventually yielding Latin vīnum and English wine.) for Southern /jajin/ ('wine'), and Samaritan Hebrew shows instead the shift */aj/ > /iː/. Original */u/ tended to shift to /i/ (e.g. אֹמֶר and אִמְרָה 'word'; חוץ 'outside' and חיצון 'outer') beginning in the second half of the second millennium BCE. This was carried through completely in Samaritan Hebrew but met more resistance in other traditions such as the Babylonian and Qumran traditions. Philippi's law is the process by which original */i/ in closed stressed syllables shifts to /a/ (e.g. /*bint/ > בַּת /bat/ 'daughter'), or sometimes in the Tiberian tradition /ɛ/ (e.g. /*ʔamint/ > אֱמֶת /ɛ̆mɛt/ 'truth'). (Note: This /a/ does not become /ɔ/ in pause, thus בת has a patah vowel in pause as well as in context. Eblaitica: essays on the Ebla archives and Eblaite language, Volume 1. Eisenbrauns. 1987. p. 20. ISBN 978-0-931464-34-8.) This is absent in the transcriptions of the Secunda, but there is evidence that the law's onset predates the Secunda. In the Samaritan tradition Philippi's law is applied consistently, e.g. */libː-u/ > /lab/ ('heart'). (Note: The only known case where Philippi's Law does not apply is in the word קן /qen/ < */qinn-u/ ('nest'). The shift */i/ > /a/ has been extended by analogy to similar forms, e.g. */ʃim-u/ > /ʃam/ ('name'; but */ʃim-u/ > /ʃem/ 'reputation'!). Ben-Ḥayyim (2000:76, 79)) In some traditions the short vowel /*a/ tended to shift to /i/ in unstressed closed syllables: this is known as the law of attenuation. It is common in the Tiberian tradition, e.g. */ʃabʕat/ > Tiberian שִבְעָה /ʃivˈʕɔ/ ('seven'), but exceptions are frequent. It is less common in the Babylonian vocalization, e.g. /ʃabʕɔ/ ('seven'), and differences in Greek and Latin transcriptions demonstrate that it began quite late. Attenuation generally did not occur before /i⁓e/, e.g. Tiberian מַפְתֵּחַ /mafˈteħ/ ('key') versus מִפְתַּח /mifˈtaħ/ ('opening [construct]'), and often was blocked before a geminate, e.g. מתנה ('gift'). Attenuation is rarely present in Samaritan Hebrew, e.g. מקדש /maqdaʃ/. (Note: Verbal forms such as יפקד = Samaritan /jifqɒd/ < */jafqud/ may be examples of Barth's law rather than attenuation.) In the Tiberian tradition /e i o u/ take offglide /a/ before /h ħ ʕ/. (Note: This is known as pataḥ furtivum, literally 'stolen pataḥ' and perhaps a mistranslation of Hebrew פתח גנובה ('pataḥ of the stolen [letter]'), as if אֵ were being inserted. See Blau (2010:83)) This is absent in the Secunda and in Samaritan Hebrew but present in the transcriptions of Jerome. In the Tiberian tradition an ultrashort echo vowel is sometimes added to clusters where the first element is a guttural, e.g. יַאֲזִין /jaʔăzin/ ('he will listen') פָּעֳלוֹ /pɔʕɔ̆lo/ ('his work') but יַאְדִּיר /jaʔdir/ ('he will make glorious') רָחְבּוֹ /ʀɔħbo/ 'its breadth'. (Note: It is evident that this epenthesis must have been a late phenomenon, since a short vowel preceding a guttural is preserved even though it becomes in an open syllable, see Blau (2010:85).) (Note: This is less common when the consonant following the guttural is a begadkefat letter, e.g. תֵּחְבֹּל /taħbol/ ('you take in pledge'). This suggests that begadkefat spirantization was no longer automatic by the time that this epenthesis occurred, see Blau (2010:79))

The following chart summarizes the most regular reflexes of the Proto-Semitic vowels in the various stages of Hebrew:

Hebrew vowel reflexes
Hebrew vowel reflexes			Hebrew language stage				
Hebrew vowel reflexes			Secunda	Jewish			Samaritan^{1}
Hebrew vowel reflexes			Secunda	Palestinian	Babylonian	Tiberian	Samaritan^{1}
Proto-Hebrew vowel	*a	usual^{7}	a	a, i^{2}			a, ɒ
Proto-Hebrew vowel	*a	lengthened^{5}	aː	a	ɔ		a, ɒ
Proto-Hebrew vowel	*a	reduced^{6}	ə	ə		ă	a, ɒ
Proto-Hebrew vowel	*i	usual^{7}	e	e, i^{8}, a^{3}		ɛ, i^{8}, a^{3}	e, i, a^{3}
Proto-Hebrew vowel	*i	lengthened^{5}	eː	e			e
Proto-Hebrew vowel	*i	reduced^{6}	ə	ə		ă, ɛ̆	e, i, a^{3}
Proto-Hebrew vowel	*u	usual^{7}	o	o, u^{8}	ɔ, u^{8}		a, ɒ, i
Proto-Hebrew vowel	*u	lengthened^{5}	oː	o			a, ɒ, i
Proto-Hebrew vowel	*u	reduced^{6}	ə	ə		ă, ɔ̆	a, ɒ, i
Proto-Hebrew vowel	*aː→*oː		oː	o			u
Proto-Hebrew vowel	*iː		iː	i			e, i
Proto-Hebrew vowel	*uː		uː	u			o, u^{4}
Proto-Hebrew vowel	*aj→*ej		eː	e			iː, i
Proto-Hebrew vowel	*aw→*ow		oː	o			uː, o

All Proto-Hebrew short vowels were deleted word-finally.

Notes:

1. Samaritan Hebrew vowels may be lengthened in the presence of etymological guttural consonants. /ə/ results from both /i/ and /e/ in closed post-tonic syllables.
2. with the law of attenuation.
3. with Philippi's law.
4. Samaritan /o u/ are nearly in complementary distribution (/o/ in open syllables, /u/ in closed syllables). /o/ contrasts only stressed final syllables.
5. lengthening occurs in some open one syllable away from the stress and some stressed syllables; exact conditions depend on the vowel and reading tradition
6. reduction occurs in the open syllables two syllables away from the stress and sometimes also in pretonic and stressed open syllables; exact conditions depend on the vowel and reading tradition.
7. mainly in most closed syllables.
8. more common before long consonants.

=== Stress ===
Proto-Hebrew generally had penultimate stress. (Note: For the purposes of vowel quality shifts, words in the construct state are treated as if the stress fell immediately on the first syllable following the word. See Janssens (1982:52)) The ultimate stress of later traditions of Hebrew usually resulted from the loss of final vowels in many words, preserving the location of proto-Semitic stress. (Note: Additionally, short stressed vowels in open syllables were reduced and lost stress, leading to ultimate stress in forms like קטלו < */qaˈtʼaluː/. In Tiberian Hebrew some words have penultimate stress in pause (before a break in reading), but ultimate stress in context, such as שָמָ֫רָה and שָמְרָה ('she watched'), because the penultimate vowel in the original form */ʃaˈmaru/ lengthened in pause, while in context it was not lengthened, and then lost the stress and was reduced due to this sound shift. See Blau (2010:146–148, 154)) Tiberian Hebrew has phonemic stress, e.g. בָּנוּ֫ /bɔˈnu/ ('they built') vs. בָּ֫נוּ /ˈbɔnu/ ('in us'); stress is most commonly ultimate, less commonly penultimate, and antipenultimate stress exists marginally, e.g. הָאֹ֫הֱלָה /hɔˈʔohɛ̆lɔ/ ('into the tent'). (Note: It is not clear that a reduced vowel should be considered as comprising a whole syllable. Note for example that the rule whereby a word's stress shifts to a preceding open syllable to avoid being adjacent to another stressed syllable skips over ultrashort vowels, e.g. עִם־יוֹ֫רְדֵי בוֹר /ʕim-ˈjorăde vor/ ('with those who go down into the pit') מְטֹ֫עֲנֵי חָ֫רֶב /măˈtʼoʕăne ˈħɔrɛv/ ('pierced with a sword'). See Blau (2010:143–144)) There does not seem to be evidence for stress in the Secunda varying from that of the Tiberian tradition. Despite sharing the loss of final vowels with Tiberian Hebrew, Samaritan Hebrew has generally not preserved Proto-Semitic stress, and has predominantly penultimate stress, with occasional ultimate stress. There is evidence that Qumran Hebrew had a similar stress pattern to Samaritan Hebrew.

== Grammar ==
Medieval grammarians of Arabic and Hebrew classified words as belonging to three parts of speech: Arabic ism ('noun'), fiʻl ('verb'), and ḥarf ('particle'); other grammarians have included more categories. In particular, adjectives and nouns show more affinity to each other than in most European languages. Biblical Hebrew has a typical Semitic morphology, characterized by the use of roots. Most words in Biblical Hebrew are formed from a root, a sequence of consonants with a general associated meaning. Roots are usually triconsonantal, with biconsonantal roots less common (depending on how some words are analyzed) and rare cases of quadri- and quinquiconsonantal roots. Roots are modified by affixation to form words. Verbal patterns are more productive and consistent, while noun patterns are less predictable.

=== Nouns and adjectives ===
The most common nominal prefix used is /m/, used for substantives of location (מוֹשָׁב 'assembly'), instruments (מַפְתֵּֽחַ 'key'), and abstractions (מִשְׁפָּט 'judgement'). The vowel after /m/ is normally /a/, but appears sometimes as /i/, or in the case of מוֹשָׁב as /o/ (contracted from */aw/). The prefix /t/ is used to denote the action of the verb; it is derived from more common for initial-/w/ verbs, e.g. תּוֹדָה ('thanksgiving'; < ydy). Prefixed /ʔ/ is used in adjectives, e.g. אַכְזָב ('deceptive'), and also occurs in nouns with initial sibilants, e.g. אֶצְבַּע ('finger'). In the latter case this prefix was added for phonetic reasons, and the א prefix is called either "prothetic" or "prosthetic". Prefixed ע often occurs in quadriliteral animal names, perhaps as a prefix, e.g. עֲטַלֵּף ('bat'), עַכְבָּר ('mouse'), עַקְרָב ('scorpion').

In proto-Semitic nouns were marked for case: in the singular the markers were */-u/ in the nominative, */-a/ in the accusative (used also for adverbials), and */-i/ in the genitive, as evidenced in Akkadian, Ugaritic, and Arabic. The Amarna letters show that this was probably still present in Hebrew c. 1350 BCE. In the development of Hebrew, final */-u, -i/ were dropped first, and later */-a/ was elided as well. Mimation, a nominal suffix */-m/ of unclear meaning, was found in early Canaanite, as shown by early Egyptian transcriptions (c. 1800 BCE) of Jerusalem as Urušalimim, but there is no indication of its presence after 1800 BCE. (Note: It has been suggested that the construct forms אבי, אחי have long /iː/ lacking in the absolute אב אח because the later stem from forms like */ʔabuːm/ > */ʔabum/ (because Proto-Semitic did not allow long vowels in closed syllables) > */ʔab/ (loss of mimation and final short vowel), see Blau (2010:267)) Final */-a/ is preserved in לַ֫יְלָה /ˈlajlɔ/, originally meaning 'at night' but in prose replacing לַ֫יִל /ˈlajil/ ('night'), and in the "connective vowels" of some prepositions (originally adverbials), e.g. עִמָּ֫נוּ ('with us'); nouns preserve */-i/ in forms like יָדֵ֫נוּ. (Note: The unstressed suffix -ה in words like ארצה ('to the earth'), occurring also in exclamations like חללה and used ornamentally in poetry, e.g. יְשׁוּעָתָהּ, may have originally terminated in consonantal */-h/ which was later elided, following the suffix */-a/. This is evidenced by Ugaritic orthography, almost purely consonantal, where ארצה appears with /h/, see Blau (2010:91–92, 268)) Construct state nouns lost case vowels at an early period (similar to Akkadian), as shown by the reflexes of */ɬadaju/ (שָֹדֶה in absolute but שְׂדֵה in construct) and the reflexes of */jadu/ (יָד and יַד) However forms like יָדֵ֫נוּ show that this was not yet a feature of Proto-Hebrew.

Biblical Hebrew has two genders, masculine and feminine, which are reflected in nouns, adjectives, pronouns, and verbs. Hebrew distinguishes between singular and plural numbers, and plural forms may also be used for collectives and honorifics. The plural can be used to form abstract states or qualities from concrete ideas, a phenomenon called the plural of abstraction. Hebrew has a morphological dual form for nouns that naturally occur in pairs and for units of measurement and time which contrasts with the plural (יוֹם 'day' יוֹמַיִם 'two days' יָמִים 'days'). A widespread misconception is that the Hebrew plural denotes three or more objects. In truth, it denotes two or more objects. However adjectives, pronouns, and verbs do not have dual forms, and most nominal dual forms can function as plurals (שֵׁשׁ כְּנָפַיִם 'six wings' from Isaiah 6:2). Finite verbs are marked for subject person, number, and gender. Nouns also have a construct form which is used in genitive constructions.

Common nouns may be marked as definite with the prefix /ha-/ followed by gemination of the initial consonant of the noun. In Tiberian Hebrew the vowel of the article may become /ɛ/ or /ɔ/ in certain phonetic environments, for example הֶחָכָם /hɛħɔˈxɔm/ ('the wise man'), הָאִישׁ /hɔˈʔiʃ/ ('the man'). However, early Hebrew grammarians like Abraham Ibn Ezra and David Kimhi have already noted that in Biblical Hebrew, the definite article may not be attached to proper nouns. Nevertheless, Reuven Chaim Klein cites philologists who point out that rabbinic sources like the Talmud seem to understand that a definite article can be applied even to a proper name.

The traditions differ on the form of segolate nouns, nouns stemming from roots with two final consonants. The anaptyctic /ɛ/ of the Tiberian tradition in segolates appears in the Septuagint (3rd century BCE) but not the Hexapla (2nd century CE), e.g. גֶּתֶר /ˈɡɛθɛr/ = Γαθερ versus כֵּסֶל /ˈkesɛl/ = Χεσλ (Psalms 49:14). This may reflect dialectal variation or phonetic versus phonemic transcriptions. Both the Palestinian and Babylonian traditions have an anaptyctic vowel in segolates, /e/ in the Palestinian tradition (e.g. /ʔeresʼ/ 'land' = Tiberian אֶרֶץ Deuteronomy 26:15) and /a/ in Babylonian (e.g. /ħepasʼ/ 'item' = Tiberian חֵפֶץ Jeremiah 22:28). The Qumran tradition sometimes shows some type of back epenthetic vowel when the first vowel is back, e.g. ⟨אוהול⟩ for Tiberian ⟨אֹהֶל⟩ /ˈʔohɛl/ ('tent').

Biblical Hebrew has two sets of personal pronouns: the free-standing independent pronouns have a nominative function, while the pronominal suffixes are genitive or accusative. Only the first person suffix has different possessive and objective forms (-י and -ני).

=== Verbs ===
Verbal consonantal roots are placed into derived verbal stems, known as בִּנְיָנִים binyanim in Hebrew; the binyanim mainly serve to indicate grammatical voice. This includes various distinctions of reflexivity, passivity, and causativity. Verbs of all binyanim have three non-finite forms (one participle, two infinitives), three modal forms (cohortative, imperative, jussive), and two major conjugations (prefixing, suffixing). (Note: The modal forms may be taken to form a single volitional class, as cohortative is used in first person, imperative (or prefixing) in second person positive, jussive (or prefixing) in second person negative, and jussive in third person. They also overlap semantically, for example a jussive form like 'May my soul ...' is semantically equivalent to a cohortative like 'May I ...'. However, the three moods stem from different classes in proto-West-Semitic. As preserved in Classical Arabic, there were originally three prefix tenses, indicative yaqtulu, jussive yaqtul, and subjunctive yaqtula, which existed for every person. In Biblical Hebrew, yaqtulu developed into the prefixing class, while yaqtul remained the jussive and yaqtula the cohortative. For most roots in Biblical Hebrew, the jussive form is identical to the indicative form. (Differentiation is typical of forms with "long" and "short" forms, e.g. indicative יכרִית, jussive יכרֵת; indicative יראה, jussive יֵרֶא) See Waltke & O'Connor (1990:564–565, 566) and Blau (2010:206).) The meaning of the prefixing and suffixing conjugations are also affected by the conjugation ו, and their meaning with respect to tense and aspect is a matter of debate.

=== Word order ===
The default word order in Biblical Hebrew is commonly thought to be VSO, though one scholar has argued that this is due to the prevalence of clauses with a wayyiqtol verb form compared to other less marked forms that use SVO either more often or at least to a comparable degree. Attributive adjectives normally follow the noun they modify. In Biblical Hebrew, possession is normally expressed with status constructus, a construction in which the possessed noun occurs in a phonologically reduced, "construct" form and is followed by the possessor noun in its normal, "absolute" form. Pronominal direct objects are either suffixed to the verb or alternatively expressed on the object-marking pronoun את.

=== Tense and aspect ===
Biblical Hebrew has two main conjugation types, the suffix conjugation, also called the Perfect, and the prefix conjugation, also called Imperfect. The Perfect verb form expressed the idea of the verb as a completed action, viewing it from start to finish as a whole, and not focusing on the process by which the verb came to be completed, stating it as a simple fact. This is often used in the past tense; however, there are some contexts in which a Perfect verb translates into the present and future tenses.

The Imperfect portrays the verb as an incomplete action along with the process by which it came about, either as an event that has not begun, an event that has begun but is still in the process, or a habitual or cyclic action that is on an ongoing repetition. The Imperfect can also express modal or conditional verbs, as well as commands in the Jussive and Cohortative moods. It is conjectured that the imperfect can express modal quality through the paragogic nun added to certain imperfect forms. While often future tense, it also has uses in the past and present under certain contexts. Biblical Hebrew tense is not necessarily reflected in the verb forms per se, but rather is determined primarily by context. The Participles also reflect ongoing or continuous actions, but are also subject to the context determining their tense.

The verbal forms can be Past Tense in these circumstances:

- Perfect, Simple Past: in narrative, reflects a simple completed action, perception, emotion or mental process, and can also be past tense from the perspective of a prior verb which is used in future tense
- Imperfect, Waw Consecutive Preterite: simple past tense which takes the וַ prefix as a conjunction, appears at the beginning of a clause when it is connected in a narrative sequence with previous clauses, where the conjunction can be translated as 'and then', 'then', 'but', 'however', sometimes is not translated at all, and can even have a parenthetical function as if suggesting the clause is like a side note to the main focus of the narrative
- Imperfect, Past: reflecting not just a past action but also suggesting the process with which it was being done, e.g.: "I brought the horse to a halt", "I began to hear"
- Imperfect, Cyclic Past: reflecting a habitual or cyclic action over time, e.g. "this is what Job would always do"
- Participle in Past Tense: an active or passive Participle being used in its imperfect verbal sense in the past, e.g. "and the Spirit of God was hovering"

The verbal forms can be Present Tense in these circumstances:

- Perfect, Proverbial/General Present: a general truth in the present tense which is not referring to a specific event, e.g. "the sun sets in the west"
- Perfect, Stative Present: present tense with verbs that depict a state of being rather than an action, including verbs of perception, emotion or mental process, e.g. "I love", "I hate", "I understand", "I know"
- Perfect, Present Perfect: a Present Perfect verb, e.g. "I have walked"
- Imperfect, Present Condition: an Imperfect verb in the present, one which implies that an action has been going on for some time and is still ongoing in the present, especially used of questions in the present, e.g. "what are you seeking?"
- Imperfect, Cyclic Present: an Imperfect verb in the present, reflecting a cyclic action in the present, e.g. "it is being said in the city", "a son makes his father glad"
- Participle in Present Tense: an active or passive Participle being used in its imperfect verbal sense in the present, e.g. "I am going"

The verbal forms can be Future Tense in these circumstances:

- Perfect, Waw Consecutive Future: by analogy to the Preterite, a simple future tense verb which takes the וְ prefix as a conjunction, appears at the beginning of a clause when it is connected in a narrative sequence with previous clauses, where the conjunction can be translated as 'and then', 'then', 'but', 'however', sometimes is not translated at all, and can even have a parenthetical function as if suggesting the clause is like a side note to the main focus of the narrative
- Perfect, Waw Consecutive Subjunctive: takes the וְ prefix as a conjunction to continue the Subjunctive Mood in a narrative sequence
- Perfect, Waw Consecutive Jussive/Cohortative: takes the וְ prefix as a conjunction to continue the Jussive and Cohortative Moods in a narrative sequence
- Perfect, Promise Future: the completeness of the verb form here expresses an imminent action in the context of promises, threats and the language of contracts and covenants in general, e.g. "I will give you this land", "will I have this pleasure?"
- Perfect, Prophetic Future: the completeness of the verb form here expresses an imminent action in the context of prophecy, e.g. "you will go into exile"
- Imperfect, Future: reflects a future event which has not yet come into completion, or one that has not yet begun, or future tense from the perspective of a prior verb which is used in past tense
- Imperfect, Subjunctive: reflects a potential, theoretical or modal verb, such as in conditional clauses, e.g. "If you go...", "she should stay"
- Imperfect, Jussive/Cohortative: reflects a non-immediate command, invitation, permission or wishful request, e.g. "let there be light", "you may eat from the tree", "let's go", "O that someone would get me a drink"

== Sample text ==
The following is a sample from Psalm 18 as appears in the Masoretic text with medieval Tiberian niqqud and cantillation and the Greek transcription of the Secunda of the Hexapla along with its reconstructed pronunciation.

Tiberian Hebrew
28 כִּֽי־אַ֭תָּה תָּאִ֣יר נֵרִ֑י יְהוָ֥ה אֱ֝לֹהַ֗י יַגִּ֥יהַּ חָשְׁכִּֽי׃
29 כִּֽי־בְ֭ךָ אָרֻ֣ץ גְּד֑וּד וּ֝בֵֽאלֹהַ֗י אֲדַלֶּג־שֽׁוּר׃
30 הָאֵל֮ תָּמִ֪ים דַּ֫רְכּ֥וֹ אִמְרַֽת־יְהוָ֥ה צְרוּפָ֑ה מָגֵ֥ן ה֝֗וּא לְכֹ֤ל ׀ הַחֹסִ֬ים בּֽוֹ׃
31 כִּ֤י מִ֣י אֱ֭לוֹהַּ מִבַּלְעֲדֵ֣י יְהוָ֑ה וּמִ֥י צ֝֗וּר זוּלָתִ֥י אֱלֹהֵֽינוּ׃
Pronunciation (Tiberian Hebrew) (IPA)

28. [kiː ʔatːɔ tɔʔiːr neriː **** ʔɛ̆lohaj jaɡːiːah ħɔʃkiː]

29. [kiː văxɔ ʔɔrusˤ ɡăðuːð uːveʔlohaj ʔăðalːɛɣ ʃuːr]

30. [hɔʔel tɔmiːm darkoː ʔimraθ **** sˤŭruːfɔ mɔɣen huːʔ lăxol haħosiːm boː]

31. [kiː miː ʔɛ̆loah mibːalʕăðej **** uːmiː sˤuːr zuːlɔθiː ʔɛ̆lohenuː]

Secunda

29. χι αθθα θαειρ νηρι YHWH ελωαι αγι οσχι

30. χι βαχ αρους γεδουδ ουβελωαι εδαλλεγ σουρ

31. αηλ θαμμιν (*-μ) δερχω εμαραθ YHWH σερουφα μαγεν ου λαχολ αωσιμ βω

32. χι μι ελω μεββελαδη YHWH ουμι σουρ ζουλαθι ελωννου (*-ηνου)

Pronunciation (Secunda) (IPA)

29. [kiː ʔatːaː taːʔiːr neːriː **** ʔaloːhaj aɡiːh ħoʃkiː]

30. [kiː baːk ʔaːruːsˤ ɡəduːd ubeloːhaj ʔədalːeɡ ʃuːr]

31. [haːʔeːl tamːiːm derkoː ʔemərat **** sˤəruːfaː maːɡen huː ləkol haħoːsiːm boː]

32. [kiː miː ʔeloːh mebːelʕadeː **** umiː sˤuːr zuːlaːtiː ʔeloːheːnuː]

== Bibliography ==
- Ben-Ḥayyim, Ze'ev (2000). A Grammar of Samaritan Hebrew. Jerusalem: The Hebrew University Magnes Press. ISBN 978-1-57506-047-7.
- Bergstrasser, Gotthelf; Daniels, Peter T. (1995). Introduction to the Semitic Languages: Text Specimens and Grammatical Sketches. München: Max Hueber Verlag München. pp. 50–75. ISBN 978-0-931464-10-2.
- Bergsträsser, G. (1983). Introduction to the Semitic Languages. Winona Lake, Indiana: Eisenbrauns. ISBN 978-0-931464-10-2.
- Joshua Blau (1981). The renaissance of modern Hebrew and modern standard Arabic. University of California Press. ISBN 978-0-520-09548-9.
- Blau, Joshua (2010). Phonology and Morphology of Biblical Hebrew. Winona Lake, Indiana: Eisenbrauns. ISBN 978-1-57506-129-0.
- Bloch, Yigal (2017). "Aramaic Influence and Inner Diachronic Development in Hebrew Inscriptions of the Iron Age". In Moshavi, Adina Mosak; Notarius, Tania (eds.). Advances in Biblical Hebrew Linguistics: Data, Methods, and Analyses. Eisenbrauns. pp. 83–112. ISBN 978-1-57506-481-9.
- Dolgopolsky, Aron (1999). From Proto-Semitic to Hebrew. Milan: Centro Studi Camito-Semitici di Milano.
- Doron, Edit (2005), "VSO and Left-conjunct Agreement: Biblical Hebrew vs. Modern Hebrew", in Kiss, Katalin É. (ed.), Universal Grammar in the Reconstruction of Dead Languages (PDF), Berlin: Mouton, pp. 239–264, ISBN 978-3-11-018550-8, archived from the original (PDF) on 10 June 2011
- Feldman, Rachel (2010). "Most ancient Hebrew biblical inscription deciphered". Archived from the original on 7 June 2011.
- Frank, Yitzhak (2003). Grammar for Gemara and Targum Onkelos. Jerusalem, Israel: Ariel United Israel Institutes. ISBN 978-1-58330-606-2.
- Garnier, Romain; Jacques, Guillaume (2012). "A neglected phonetic law: The assimilation of pretonic yod to a following coronal in North-West Semitic". Bulletin of the School of Oriental and African Studies. 75 (1): 135–145. doi:10.1017/s0041977x11001261. S2CID 16649580.
- Glinert, Lewis (2004). The Grammar of Modern Hebrew. Cambridge University Press. ISBN 978-0-521-61188-6.
- Hanson, K. C. (2011). "The Gezer Almanac". Archived from the original on 8 June 2011.
- Janssens, Gerard (1982). Studies in Hebrew historical linguistics based on Origen's Secunda. Orientalia Gandensia. Vol. 9. Uitgeverij Peeters. ISBN 978-2-8017-0189-8.
- Jobes, Karen H.; Silva, Moises (2001). Invitation to the Septuagint. Paternoster Press. ISBN 978-1-84227-061-5.
- Kogan, Leonid (2011). "Proto-Semitic Phonology and Phonetics". In Weninger, Stefan (ed.). The Semitic Languages: An International Handbook. Walter de Gruyter. pp. 54–151. ISBN 978-3-11-025158-6.
- LaSor, William Sanford (1978). Handbook of Biblical Hebrew. Grand Rapids, MI: Wm. B. Eerdmans Publishing Co. ISBN 978-0-8028-0444-0.
- Rainey, Anson (2008). "Shasu or Habiru. Who Were the Early Israelites?". Biblical Archaeology Review. 34 (6 (Nov/Dec)). Biblical Archaeology Society. Archived from the original on 31 May 2012.
- Rendsburg, Gary A. (1997), "Ancient Hebrew Phonology", in Kaye, Alan (ed.), Phonologies of Asia and Africa, Eisenbrauns, pp. 65–83, ISBN 978-1-57506-019-4, archived from the original on 20 July 2011
- Rendsburg, Gary A. (1999), "Notes on Israelian Hebrew (I)", in Avishur, Yitzhak Avishur; Deutsch, Robert (eds.), Michael: Historical, Epigraphical and Biblical Studies in Honor of Prof. Michael Heltzer, Tel Aviv: Archaeological Center Publications, pp. 255–258, archived from the original on 20 July 2011
- Rosén, H. (1969). "Israel Language Policy and Linguistics". Ariel. 25: 48–63.
- Sáenz-Badillos, Angel (1993). A History of the Hebrew Language. Cambridge University Press. ISBN 978-0-521-55634-7.
- Shanks, Hershel (2010). "Oldest Hebrew Inscription Discovered in Israelite Fort on Philistine Border". Biblical Archaeology Review. 36 (2): 51–6. Archived from the original on 29 February 2012.
- Sperber, Alexander (1959). A Grammar of Masoretic Hebrew. Copenhagen: Ejnar Munksgaard.
- Sperber, Alexander (1966). A Historical Grammar of Biblical Hebrew. Leiden: E. J. Brill.
- Steinberg, David (2010). "History of the Ancient and Modern Hebrew Language".
- Steiner, Richard C. (1997). "Ancient Hebrew". In Hetzron, Robert (ed.). The Semitic Languages. Routledge. pp. 145–173. ISBN 978-0-415-05767-7.
- Tov, Emanuel (1992). Textual Criticism of the Hebrew Bible. Minneapolis: Augsburg Fortress. ISBN 978-0-8006-3429-2.
- Waltke, Bruce K.; O'Connor, M. (1990). An Introduction to Biblical Hebrew Syntax. Winona Lake, Indiana: Eisenbrauns. ISBN 978-0-931464-31-7.
- Weninger, Stefan; Khan, Geoffrey; Streck, Michael P.; Watson, Janet C. E. (2011). The Semitic languages: an international handbook. Berlin Boston: De Gruyter Mouton. ISBN 978-3-11-018613-0.
- Yahalom, Joseph (1997). Palestinian Vocalised Piyyut Manuscripts in the Cambridge Genizah Collections. Cambridge University. ISBN 978-0-521-58399-2.
- Yardeni, Ada (1997). The Book of Hebrew Script. Jerusalem: Carta. ISBN 978-965-220-369-4.
- Yeivin, Israel (1980). Introduction to the Tiberian Masorah. Scholars Press. ISBN 978-0-89130-373-2.
- Zuckermann, Ghil'ad (2006). "Complement Clause Types in Israeli". In Dixon, R. M. W.; Aikhenvald, Alexandra Y. (eds.). Complementation: a cross-linguistic typology.
