= Secunda =

Secunda, a variant of the number two (2), may refer to:

- Secunda (Hexapla), the first known Hebrew-Greek transliteration of The Old Testament, attributed to Author Origen
- Secunda, South Africa, a town developed by Sasol fuel company
- Rufina and Secunda, Roman virgin-martyrs and Christian saints
- Don E. Secunda, founder of U.S. Gas and Electric
- Sholom Secunda (1894–1974), American composer of Ukrainian-Jewish descent
- Thomas Secunda, co-founder of Bloomberg L.P.
- Palaestina Secunda, part of the Eastern Roman Empire.
