= Philippi's law =

Philippi's law refers to a sound rule in Biblical Hebrew first identified by F. W. M. Philippi in 1878, but has since been refined by Thomas O. Lambdin.

Essentially, in Biblical Hebrew, sometimes the sound /i/ shifted to /a/, but the reason for this development was unclear or debated. It is "universally supposed to be operative", according to linguists in the field, but criticized as "Philippi's law falls woefully short of what one would expect of a 'law' in historical phonology...."

Some critics suggested that it might not even be a rule in Hebrew, but rather a sound rule in Aramaic. Even Philippi, who mentions it in an article about the numeral '2' in Semitic, proposed that "the rule was Proto-Semitic" in origin. Philippi's law is also used to explain the vowel shift of Proto-Semitic bint for daughter to the Hebrew word bat (בת) and many other words.

== See also ==
- Grimm's law
