= Paragogic nun =

Concept in Hebrew morphology

In Hebrew morphology, the paragogic nun (from paragoge 'addition at the end of a word') is a nun letter (נ) added at the end of certain verb forms, without changing the general meaning of the conjugation. Its function is debated and may involve a modal change to the meaning of the verb.

== Occurrences ==
It occurs most commonly in the plural 2nd and 3rd persons of imperfect forms. Examples include: 'you shall live' as תִּחְיוּן instead of תִּחְיוּ, 'you shall inherit' as תִּירָשׁוּן instead of תִּירָשׁוּ (Deuteronomy 5:33).

It is a common phenomenon, appearing 106 times in the Pentateuch, but has unequal distribution: 58 occurrences in Deuteronomy, none in Leviticus.

== Explanation ==
The general meaning of the verb form is not altered by the added nun, and grammarians have proposed various explanations for the phenomenon: an archaism preserved as a matter of style, a syntactic or phonological rule that is not consistently applied because of hypercorrection, etc.

Recent inquiries suggest that the paragogic nun conveys the dependent quality of a subordinate statement, whether the subordinate has a modal function (purposive, obligation/permission, temporal), as in the following sentence where the nun conjugation does not appear in the first verb, and does appear in the next verbs conjugated in the same tense and persons:

« בְּכָל הַדֶּרֶךְ ... תֵּלֵכוּ ... לְמַעַן תִּחְיוּן ... בָּאָרֶץ אֲשֶׁר תִּירָשׁוּן » (Deut 5:33) « In this way ... you shall walk ^{main clause: regular conjugation 'go' without nun תֵּלֵכוּ}, so that you may live ^{subordinate clause}^{: 'live' and 'possess' with nun תִּחְיוּן, תִּירָשׁוּן} ... in the land which you shall possess »

or:

« וְלֹ֥א תִגְּע֖וּ בּ֑וֹ פֶּן־תְּמֻתֽוּן » (Gen 3:3) « nor shall you touch^{regular conjugation} it, lest you die^{conjugation with final nun} »

or, in a simple temporal clause, as in the following sentence where the same verb in the same tense and person receives the nun inside the clause, and does not outside the clause:

« וְהָיָה כִּי תֵלֵכוּן לֹא תֵלְכוּ רֵיקָם » (Ex 3:21) « and when you go ^{subordinate clause: 'go' with nun תֵלֵכוּן}, you shall not go empty ^{main clause: regular conjugation 'go' without nun תֵלְכוּ} »

However, some instances are difficult to explain, which is why some researchers mention the randomness or stylistic quality of the phenomenon: it does not appear in Ex. 4:8 וְהָיָה אִם לֹא יַאֲמִינוּ לָךְ וְלֹא יִשְׁמְעוּ but does appear in the next verse (יִשְׁמְעוּן), which has almost identical meaning and structure: Ex. 4:9 וְהָיָה אִם לֹא יַאֲמִינוּ גַּם לִשְׁנֵי הָאֹתוֹת הָאֵלֶּה וְלֹא יִשְׁמְעוּן.

== Other languages ==
In Phoenician, Arabic and Aramaic, contrary to Hebrew, the imperfect forms in plural 2nd and 3rd persons always display the final nun. Removing this final nun creates the jussive modal forms, in Phoenician and in Aramaic. In Classical Arabic the forms without "nun" are used also for the subjunctive. In this way, a similar modal shift between the forms with and without final nun may explain the phenomenon in Hebrew.
