= Tiberian vocalization =

System of diacritics for the Hebrew Bible

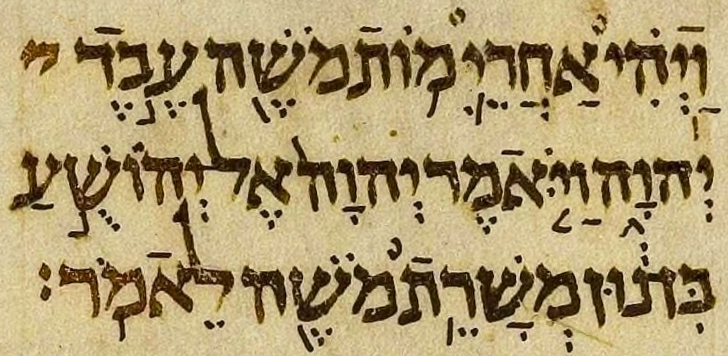
Closeup of Aleppo Codex, Joshua 1:1

The Tiberian vocalization, Tiberian pointing, or Tiberian niqqud (Hebrew: הַנִּקּוּד הַטְּבֶרְיָנִי, romanized: hanniqquḏ haṭṭəḇeryāni) is a system of diacritics (niqqud) devised by the Masoretes of Tiberias to add to the consonantal text of the Hebrew Bible to produce the Masoretic Text. The system soon became used to vocalize other Hebrew texts as well.

Tiberian vocalization marks vowels and stress, distinguishes consonant quality and length, and serves as punctuation. While the Tiberian system was devised for Tiberian Hebrew, it has become the dominant system for vocalizing all forms of Hebrew. It has long since eclipsed the comparatively rudimentary Babylonian and Palestinian vocalization systems for writing Biblical Hebrew.

== Consonant diacritics ==
The sin dot distinguishes between the two values of ש. A dagesh indicates a consonant is geminate or unspirantized, and a raphe indicates spirantization. The mappiq indicates that ה is consonantal, not silent, in syllable-coda position.

== Vowel diacritics ==
The seven vowel qualities of Tiberian Hebrew are indicated straightforwardly by distinct diacritics:

| niqqud with א | אַ | אֶ | אֵ | אִ | אָ | אֹ | אֻ | אוּ |
| name | patah | segol | tzere | hiriq | qamatz | holam | qubutz | shuruq |
| value | /a/ | /ɛ/ | /e/ | /i/ | /ɔ/ | /o/ | /u/ | |

The diacritics qubutz and shuruq both represent /u/, but shuruq is used when the text uses full spelling (with waw as a mater lectionis). Each of the vowel phonemes could be allophonically lengthened; occasionally, the length is marked with metheg. Metheg also indirectly indicates when a following shva is vocal.

The ultrashort vowels are slightly more complicated. There were two graphemes corresponding to the vowel /ă/, attested by alternations in manuscripts like ארֲריך~ארְריך, ואשמֳעָה~ואשמְעָה.. In addition, one of the graphemes could also be silent:

| niqqud with א | אְ | אֲ | אֱ | אֳ |
| name | shva | hataf patah | hataf segol | hataf qamatz |
| value | /ă/, ⌀ | /ă/ | /ɛ̆/ | /ɔ̆/ |

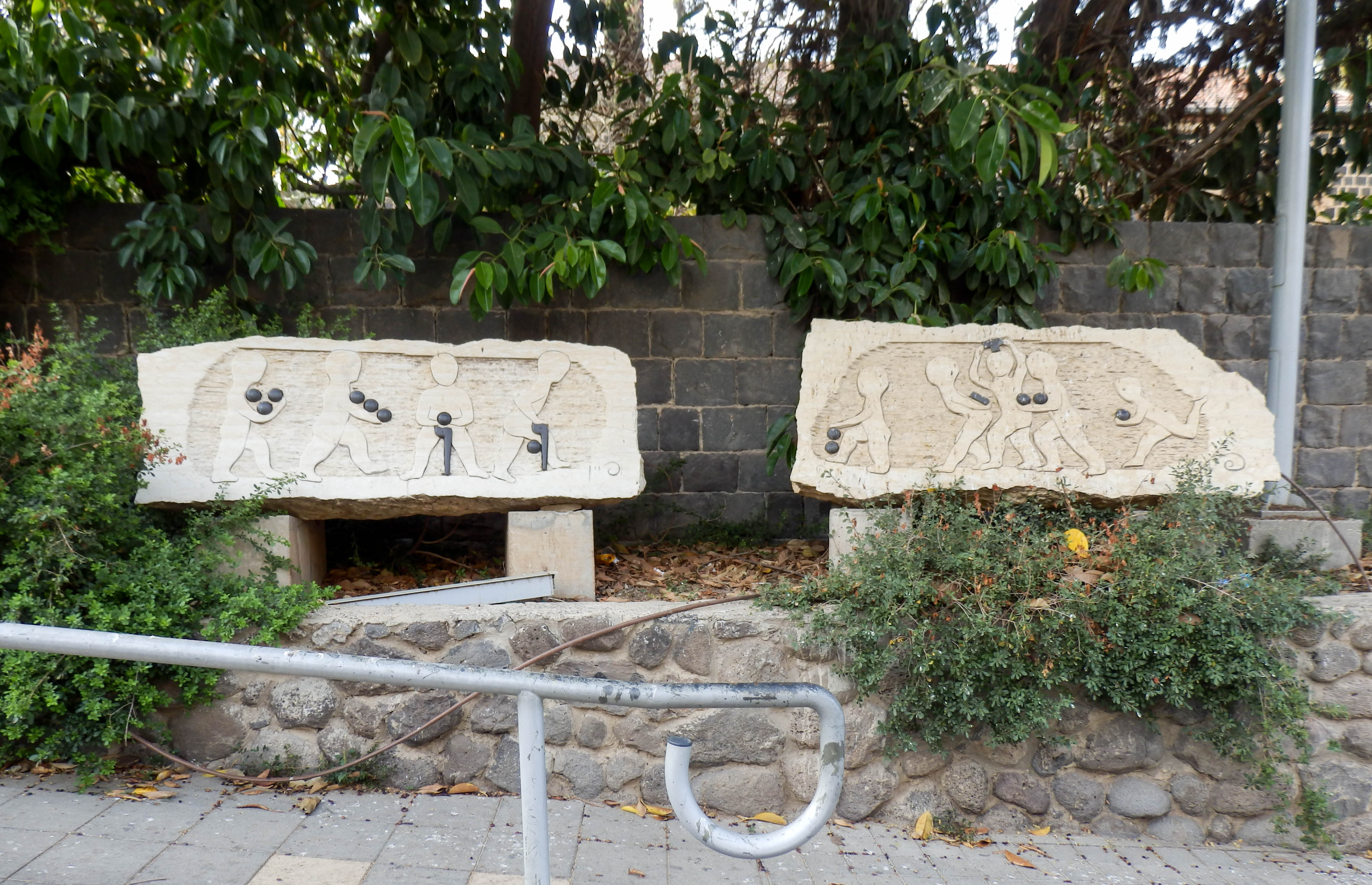
Figurines holding Tiberian vowel diacritics. Limestone and basalt artwork at the shore in Tiberias.

Shva was used both to indicate lack of a vowel (quiescent šwa, shva naḥ) and as another symbol to represent the phoneme /ă/ (mobile šwa, shva naʻ), the latter also represented by hataf patah. The phoneme /ă/ had a number of allophones; /ă/ had to be written with shva rather than hataf patah when it was not pronounced as [ă]. Before a laryngeal-pharyngeal, mobile šwa was pronounced as an ultrashort copy of the following vowel (וּבָקְעָה [uvɔqɔ̆ʕɔ]) and as [ĭ] preceding /j/, (תְדַמְּיוּ֫נִי /θăðammĭjuni/). Using ḥataf vowels was mandatory under gutturals but optional under other letters, and there was considerable variation among manuscripts.

That is referenced specifically by medieval grammarians:

If one argues that the dalet of 'Mordecai' (and other letters in other words) has hatef qames, tell him, 'but this sign is only a device used by some scribes to warn that the consonants should be pronounced fully, and not slurred over'.

— Abu al-Faraj Harun, Hidāyat al-Qāri (Horayat Ha-Qore), quoted in Yeivin (1980:283–284)

The names of the vowel diacritics are iconic and show some variation:

The names of the vowels are mostly taken from the form and action of the mouth in producing the various sounds, as פַּ֫תַח opening; צֵ֫רֵי a wide parting (of the mouth), also שֶׁ֫בֶר (=ĭ) breaking, parting (cf. the Arab. kasr); חִ֫ירֶק (also חִרֶק) narrow opening; ח֫וֹלֶם closing, according to others fullness, i.e. of the mouth (also מְלֹא פוּם fullness of the mouth). קָ֫מֶץ also denotes a slighter, as שׁוּרֶק and קִבּוּץ (also קבוץ פּוּם) a firmer, compression or contraction of the mouth. Sĕgôl (סְגוֹל bunch of grapes) takes its name from its form. So שָׁלשׁ נְקֻדּוֹת (three points) is another name for Qibbûṣ.
Moreover the names were mostly so formed (but only later), that the sound of each vowel is heard in the first syllable (קָמֶץ for קֹמֶץ, פַּתַח for פֶּתַח, צֵרִי for צְרִי); in order to carry this out consistently some even write Sägôl, Qomeṣ-ḥatûf, Qübbûṣ.

— Wilhelm Gesenius, Gesenius' Hebrew Grammar, §8d-e

== Cantillation ==
Cantillation signs mark stress and punctuation. Metheg may mark secondary stress, and maqqaf (hyphen) conjoins words into one stress unit, which normally takes only one cantillation mark on the final word in the unit.

== See also ==
- Babylonian vocalization
- Hebrew cantillation
- Cardinal vowels
- Niqqud
- Palestinian vocalization
- Tiberian Hebrew

== Sources ==
- Blau, Joshua (2010). Phonology and Morphology of Biblical Hebrew. Winona Lake, Indiana: Eisenbrauns. ISBN 978-1-57506-129-0.
- Sáenz-Badillos, Angel (1993). A History of the Hebrew Language. Cambridge University Press. ISBN 0-521-55634-1.
- Yeivin, Israel (1980). Introduction to the Tiberian Masorah. Scholars Press. ISBN 0-89130-373-1.
