= Palestinian vocalization =

Extinct system of diacritics for Hebrew

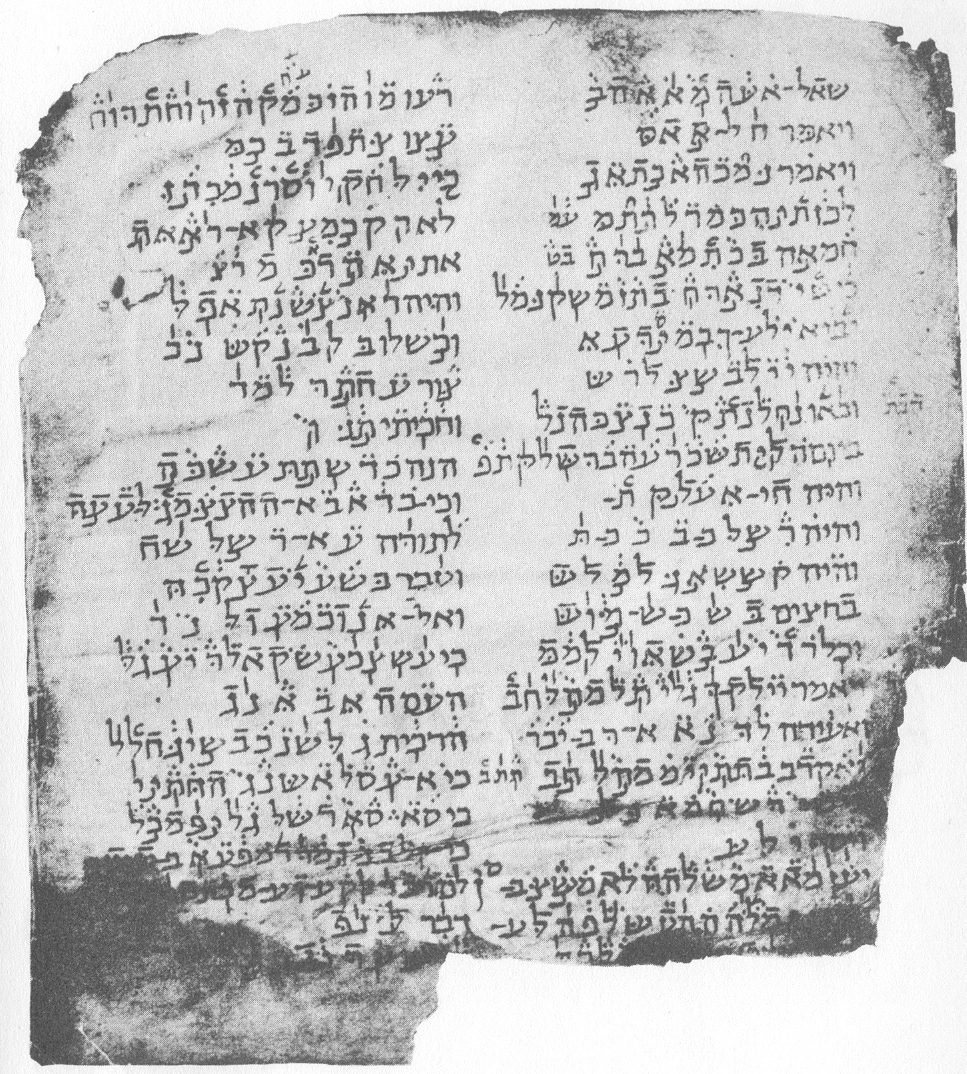
Example of Palestinian vocalization: Geniza fragment (Bod. Ms Heb. e. 30, fol. 48b) with Isaiah 7:11-9:8 in shorthand script (serugin).

The Palestinian vocalization, Palestinian pointing, Palestinian niqqud or Vocalization of the Land of Israel (Hebrew: נִקּוּד אֶרֶץ־יִשְׂרְאֵלִי, romanized: niqqūḏ ʾereṣ-Yiśrəʾēlī) is an extinct system of niqqud (diacritics) devised by scholars to add to the Hebrew Bible to indicate vowel quality. The Palestinian system is no longer used, long supplanted by the Tiberian vocalization.

== History ==
The Palestinian vocalization reflects a Hebrew dialect of Palestine from the sixth to the eighth century, long after it had become extinct as a first language before the third century. After it was no longer used as a vernacular, religious scholars preserved the previously distinct dialects; scholars of the era noted that Hebrew was still used it to communicate (Hebrew: לדבור) as late as the 10th century in Tiberias.

Palestinian Hebrew was a distinct dialect to Samaritan Hebrew, the Hebrew recorded in the Dead Sea Scrolls, and to Babylonian and Tiberian Hebrew. Palestinian Hebrew is the antecedent to all modern pronunciations traditions of Hebrew except for that of Yemeni Hebrew, which is based on Babylonian Hebrew; the Tiberian pointing is universally employed but the dialect underlying it went extinct in the 12th century.

A standard view among scholars is that the Palestinian system preceded the Tiberian system, but later came under the latter's influence and became more similar to the Tiberian tradition of the school of Aaron ben Moses ben Asher. All known examples of the Palestinian vocalization come from the Cairo Geniza, discovered at the end of the 19th century, although scholars had first encountered a reference to this system in 1839 in the Vitry Machzor. In particular, Palestinian piyyutim generally make up the most ancient of the texts found, the earliest of which date to the 8th or 9th centuries and predate most of the known biblical fragments.

== Description ==
Like with the Babylonian vocalization, only critical vowels are indicated. The Palestinian and Babylonian vocalizations are known as "superlinear vocalizations" because they place the vowels above the consonant letters. The Tiberian system marks them both above and below.

Different manuscripts show significant systematic variations in vocalization. There is a general progression towards a more differentiated writing system closer to that of Tiberian Hebrew over time.

The earliest manuscripts use just six graphemes, reflecting a pronunciation similar to contemporary Sephardi Hebrew:

niqqud with ב						
Tiberian analogue	patah, qamatz	segol, tzere	hiriq	holam	qubutz, shuruq	shva naʿ
value	/a/	/e/	/i/	/o/	/u/	/ə/

The most commonly occurring Palestinian system uses eight graphemes, reflecting later vowel differentiation in the direction of Tiberian Hebrew:

niqqud with ב								
Tiberian analogue	patah	qamatz	segol	tzere	hiriq	holam	qubutz, shuruq	shva naʿ
value	/a/	/ɔ/	/ɛ/	/e/	/i/	/o/	/u/	/ə/

Even so, most Palestinian manuscripts show interchanges between qamatz and patah, and between tzere and segol. Shva is marked in multiple ways.

== Palestino-Tiberian vocalization ==
Some manuscripts are vocalized with the Tiberian graphemes used in a manner closer to the Palestinian system. The most widely accepted term for this vocalization system is the Palestino-Tiberian vocalization. This system originated in the east, most likely in Palestine. It spread to central Europe by the middle of the 12th century in modified form, often used by Ashkenazi scribes due to its greater affinity with old Ashkenazi Hebrew than the Tiberian system. For a period of time both were used in biblical and liturgical texts, but by the middle of the 14th century it had ceased being used in favor of the Tiberian vocalization.

== See also ==
- Babylonian vocalization
- Niqqud

== Bibliography ==
- Blau, Joshua (2010). Phonology and Morphology of Biblical Hebrew. Winona Lake, Indiana: Eisenbrauns. ISBN 978-1-57506-129-0.
- Sáenz-Badillos, Angel (1993). A History of the Hebrew Language. Cambridge University Press. ISBN 0-521-55634-1.
- Tov, Emanuel (1992). Textual Criticism of the Hebrew Bible. Minneapolis: Augsburg Fortress. ISBN 978-0-8006-3429-2.
- Yahalom, Joseph (1997). Palestinian Vocalised Piyyut Manuscripts in the Cambridge Genizah Collections. Cambridge University. ISBN 0-521-58399-3.
