= Secunda (Hexapla) =

Second column of Origen's Hexapla

The Secunda is the second column of Origen's Hexapla, a compilation of the Hebrew Bible and Greek versions. It consists of a transliteration of the Hebrew text of the Hebrew Bible into the Greek alphabet. As such it serves as an important document for Hebrew philology, in particular the study of Biblical Hebrew phonology.

== Authorship ==
There is contention as to whether Origen wrote the Secunda, or perhaps a contemporary of his, or that it was a copy of a preexisting older text. Some suppose that Origen wrote the text himself, perhaps with Jewish helpers. Others think that the Secunda was a preexisting text added into the Hexapla as an aid for the reader. There is evidence that Jews of the time made use of transcriptions; for instance, a passage in the Jerusalem Talmud describes how the Jews of Caesarea would misread the Tetragrammaton as the graphically similar πιπι, suggesting the use of transcribed texts with the Tetragrammaton preserved in Hebrew characters. There is also phonetic evidence for the Secunda being a preexisting text. By the time of Origen, < η αι > were pronounced [iː ɛː], a merger which had already begun around 100 BCE, while in the Secunda, they are used to represent Hebrew /eː aj/.

== Orthography ==
The text of the Secunda uses various Greek diacritics:

A diaeresis is used on the character iota (<ι> to <ϊ>) precisely when iota occurs after a vowel, except when <ει> indicates /iː/. This is completely independent of whether the segment is consonantal or vocalic in Hebrew, as the following examples attest:

Secunda αλαϊ alaï /a.la.i/ = Tiberian עָלַ֛י ʿālay /ʕaːlaj/
Secunda φεδιων phediōn /pʰɛ.di.on/ = Tiberian פִדְיוֹם pīḏyōn /piːð.joːn/

The diaeresis was a later addition of the 8th or 9th century to the Secunda.

The use of rough and smooth breathing signs does not follow an obvious pattern; for example, compare:

Secunda ἀμιμ amim /a.mim/ = Tiberian עַמִּים ʿammīm /ʕam'miːm/ versus ἁφαρ haphar /(h)a.pʰar/ = עָפָר ʿāp̄ār /ʕaːfaːr/. These signs were also an addition of the 8th or 9th century.

The use of accents in the Secunda does not correspond with stress in Masoretic Hebrew; their presence remains a puzzle.

Reflexes of proto-Semitic vowels
Original vowel:		a	i	u	aː	iː	uː
Secunda	long	aː α	eː η	oː ω	aː/oː α/ω	iː/eː ι/η	uː/oː ου/ω
Secunda	short	æ α/ε	e ε	o ο			
Secunda	reduced	ə α/ε/-	ə α/ε/-	ə α/ε/-			

== Bibliography ==
- Janssens, Gerard (1982). "Studies in Hebrew Historical Linguistics Based on Origen's Secunda". Orientalia Gandensia. 9. Uitgeverij Peeters. ISBN 2-8017-0189-0.
