= Yehoshua Blau =

Israeli scholar (1919–2020)

- יהושע בלאו
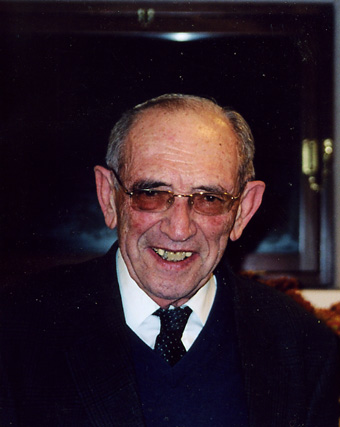
- Born: 22 September 1919; Cluj, Romania
- Died: 20 October 2020 (aged 101)
- Occupation: Linguist
- Children: 2
- Awards: Israel Prize (1985)

Yehoshua Blau, also spelled Joshua (Hebrew: יהושע בלאו; 22 September 1919 – 20 October 2020) was an Israeli scholar of Arabic language and literature, previously Professor Emeritus at the Hebrew University of Jerusalem. In 1985, he received the Israel Prize for Linguistics and Hebrew language.

== Life and career ==
Blau was born in Cluj, Romania in September 1919. He moved to Mandatory Palestine with his family in 1938. He earned a master's degree in Hebrew, Arabic, and Biblical studies in 1942. He married Shulamit Haviv, the sister of Avshalom Haviv, in 1945, and they had a son and daughter. His doctoral studies were interrupted by the 1948 Arab-Israeli War, during which he served in the Israel Defense Forces in an intelligence unit. He was awarded a PhD in 1950 for his dissertation, "The Grammar of Judeo-Arabic." Prior to his academic career, he taught at high schools and published several Hebrew grammars. He briefly taught at Tel Aviv University before taking an academic position at the Hebrew University of Jerusalem, where he taught from 1957 to 1986. Even after his retirement, he remained a professor emeritus and informally guided graduate students into his late 90s. He was an active member of the Academy of the Hebrew Language since the 1950s and served as its president from 1981 to 1993. He continued to edit its journal until 1999.

Blau was elected a Corresponding Fellow of the British Academy in 1983. He published a number of books and articles on the Arabic and Hebrew languages, and the Semitic languages generally, in Hebrew and English (and occasionally in German). Blau was elected as a member of the Israel Academy of Sciences and Humanities in 1968.

== Selected works ==
- A grammar of Biblical Hebrew (Porta linguarum Orientalium: Neue Serie 12). Wiesbaden: O. Harrassowitz. (1976)
- On Pseudo-Corrections in Some Semitic Languages. Jerusalem: The Israel Academy of Sciences and Humanities. (1970)
- Phonology and Morphology of Biblical Hebrew (LSAWS 2). Winona Lake: Eisenbrauns. (2010)

== See also ==
- Jewish languages
- Judeo-Arabic languages
