= Sennefer (treasurer) =

Ancient Egyptian treasurer

- Treasurer
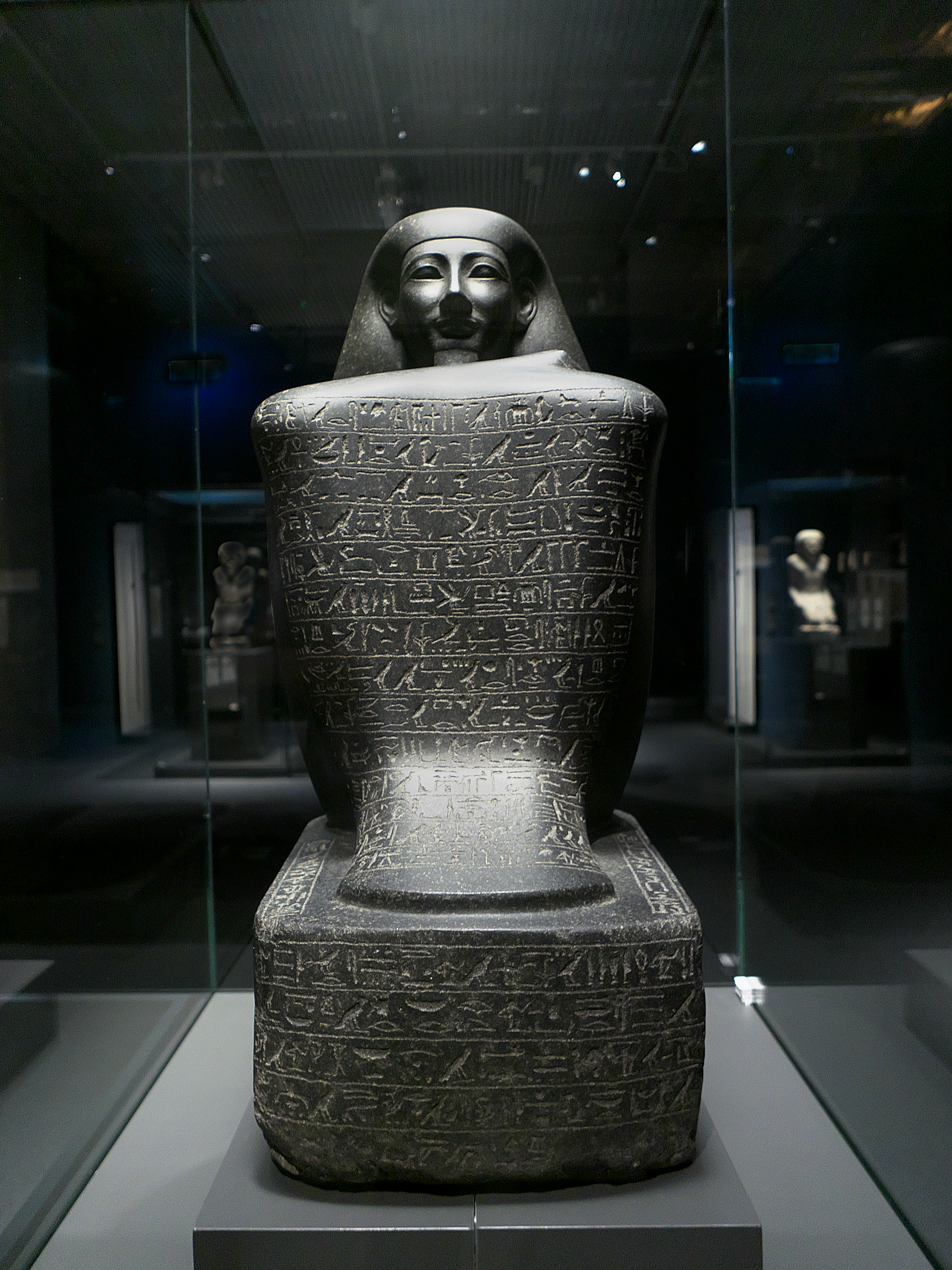
- Predecessor: Tay
- Dynasty: 18th Dynasty
- Pharaoh: Thutmose III
- Burial: TT99
- Spouse: Taimau
- Mother: Sitdhout

Sennefer or Senneferi was an ancient Egyptian official during the 18th Dynasty.

== Biography ==
Son of the lady Sitdhout and married to Taimau, Sennefer started his career under Thutmose II and continued it under Hatshepsut and finally under Thutmose III, when he reached the charges of "Overseer of the Seal" (treasurer, or chancellor) and "Overseer of the Gold-Land of Amun". Senneferi followed Tay in the office as Overseer of the Seal. Tay was for sure still in year 25 of Thutmose III in office. Senneferi is first attested for sure on a papyrus that dates in the years 28 to 35 of the reign of the same king.

A shrine was dedicated to Sennefer at Es-Sibaya, a stone quarrying region some 65 kilometres south of Thebes. He was buried in Theban Tomb 99 (TT99), located in the Sheikh Abd el-Qurna district of the Theban Necropolis, opposite Luxor.
Sennefer seems to have been related to the High Priest of Amun Amenhotep, the owner of Tomb C.3, as he is mentioned in the inscriptions in that tomb, and a statue of Amenhotep was found in TT99.
