= Robert K. Logan =

American physicist (born 1939)

- Born: August 31, 1939 (age 87); United States
- Education: Massachusetts Institute of Technology
- Occupation: Physicist / media ecologist

Robert K. Logan (born August 31, 1939), originally trained as a physicist, is a media ecologist.

== Career ==
He received from MIT a BS in 1961 and a PhD in 1965 under the supervision of Francis E. Low. After two post-doctoral appointments as a research associate at the University of Illinois at Urbana-Champaign (1965-7) and the University of Toronto (1967-8), he became a physics professor in 1968 at Toronto until his retirement in 2005. He is now professor emeritus. He is a fellow of St. Michael's College, University of Toronto, the Origins Institute at McMaster University and Institute of Biocomplexity and Informatics at the University of Calgary.

While active at the University of Toronto, in addition to math-based physics courses he taught an interdisciplinary course – The Poetry of Physics – which led to his collaboration with Marshall McLuhan, and his research in media ecology and the evolution of language. His best known works are The Alphabet Effect – based on a paper Logan co-authored with McLuhan – which develops the hypothesis that the alphabet, codified law, monotheism, abstract science and deductive logic form an autocatalytic set of ideas that developed uniquely between 2000 BC and 500 BC between the Tigris-Euphrates river system and the Aegean Sea; The Sixth Language: Learning a Living in the Internet Age which deals with the hypothesis that speech, writing, math, science, computing and the Internet form an evolutionary chain of languages; The Extended Mind: The Emergence of Language, the Human Mind and Culture develops a model for the origin of language, the human mind and culture using ideas from The Sixth Language.

Logan has also been chief scientist at Strategic Innovation Lab at OCAD University in Toronto, Ontario since 2007, and a senior fellow at the university's Strategic Innovation Lab (sLab). Part of his work at OCAD involved a language-based project to change popular attitudes about the environment, which resulted in the coining of the word "depletist".

In September 2010, Logan founded the McLuhan Legacy Network, a non-profit organization based in Toronto dedicated to renewing the legacy of Marshall McLuhan and celebrating the centenary of McLuhan's birth in 2011.

In 2020 Logan launched the journal New Explorations: Studies in Culture and Communication as the founding editor. The journal has been published on average twice annually since then through 2026 with the last issue Vol 5 #2 available at https://jps.library.utoronto.ca/index.php/nexj/issue/view/3000.

Logan's work is influenced by Marshall McLuhan, Harold Innis, Alvin Toffler, Stuart Kauffman and Terrence Deacon.

== Awards and honors ==
The Sixth Language won the Suzanne K. Langer Award for Outstanding Scholarship in the Ecology of Symbolic Form in 2000 from the Media Ecology Association, and in June 2011 Logan received the Walter J. Ong Award for Career Achievement in Scholarship from the same Association.

== Books ==
- (ed.) The Way Ahead for Canada. (1977) Lester and Orpen.
- with Steven.D. Berkowitz (eds.) Canada’s Third Option. (1978) MacMillan Canada.
- The Fifth Language: Learning a Living in the Computer Age. (1997) Stoddart Publishing.
- with Louis W. Stokes. Collaborate to Compete: Driving Profitability in the Knowledge Economy (2004) John Wiley & Sons (Mandarin Edition ISBN 7-5080-3669-7).
- The Alphabet Effect. (2004) Hampton Press. ISBN 1-57273-522-8
- The Sixth Language. (2004) Blackburn Press. ISBN 1-930665-99-7
- "The Extended Mind Model of the Origin of Language and Culture" in Gontier, Nathalie; Van Bendegem, Jean Paul; and Aerts, Diederik (eds.) Evolutionary Epistemology, Language and Culture. (2005) Springer Publishing.
- The Extended Mind: The Emergence of Language, the Human Mind and Culture. (2007) University of Toronto Press. ISBN 978-0-8020-9303-5
- Understanding New Media: Extending Marshall McLuhan. (2010) Peter Lang Publishing. ISBN 978-1-4331-1126-6
- The Poetry of Physics and the Physics of Poetry. (2010) World Scientific Publishing. ISBN 981-4295-93-0
- McLuhan Misunderstood: Setting the Record Straight. (2013) The Key Publishing House. ISBN 978-1926780528
- What Is Information?: Propagating Organization in the Biosphere, Symbolosphere, Technosphere and Econosphere. (2014) ISBN 978-1-60888-996-9
- with Marshall McLuhan. The Future of the Library: From Electric Media to Digital Media. (2016) Peter Lang Publishing. ISBN 978-1-4331-3264-3
