= Tomb C.3 =

Theban tomb

Tomb C.3 is an ancient Egyptian sepulchre in Thebes, Upper Egypt. It is located in Sheikh Abd el-Qurna, part of the Theban Necropolis on the west bank of the Nile opposite Luxor.

After the tomb's initial discovery in 1880, its location was lost for around 130 years, when the sepulchre was buried in drifting sand. Its location was rediscovered in March 2009 by a Belgian team examining the site.

The tomb consists of an enclosure and a large hall divided into two parts by six columns.

It is the burial place of the Ancient Egyptian noble, Amenhotep.

The sepulchre is located near the TT29 tomb, and not, as had been supposed for many years, near TT61. A statue of Amenhotep was found in the tomb of Senneferi, TT99, and may have been related to him in some way. The tomb was recorded by Karl Piehl in the 1880s, and this is the only record of its decoration and contents prior to its rediscovery in 2009.

== See also ==
- List of Theban Tombs
