= Ptahmose (treasurer) =

Ancient Egyptian treasurer

- Treasurer
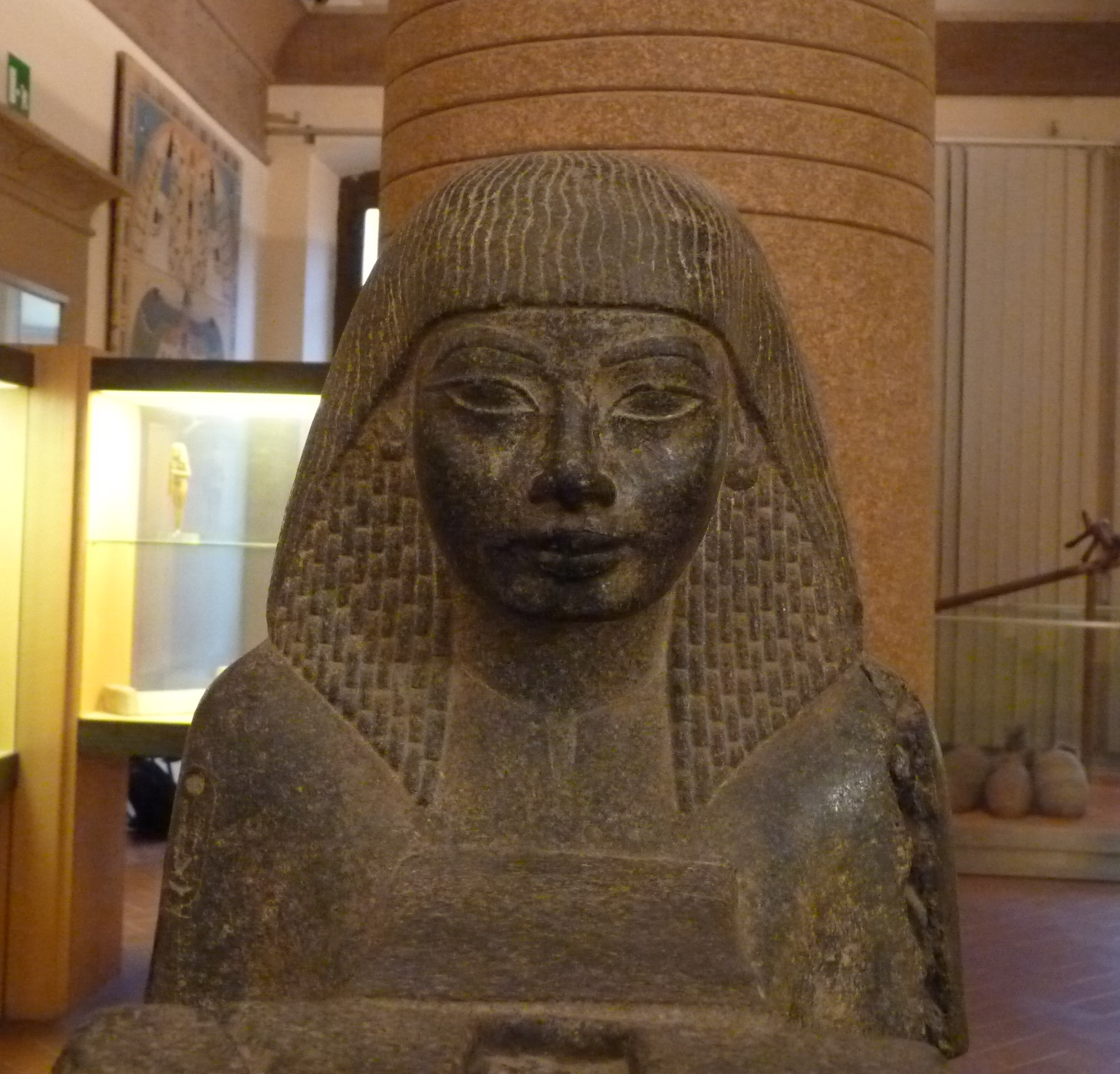
- Closeup of Ptahmose's statue in Florence.
- Predecessor: Meryre
- Dynasty: 18th dynasty
- Pharaoh: Amenhotep III
- Children: Hj

Ptahmose was Overseer of the seals (Treasurer) under Amenhotep III, during the 18th Dynasty of Egypt.

He probably officiated at the very end of the reign of Amenhotep III and was the successor of Meryre in his office.

Ptahmose is attested only by a dark granite statue from Thebes, dedicated to him by his son Hj and now in Florence (inv. 1791), and by an inscription on a vessel from Malkata. This inscription proves that he was treasurer at the time of the first Sed festival of Amenhotep III (i.e. the Year 30 of this pharaoh).

The location of Ptahmose's tomb is unknown.

== Bibliography ==
- Arielle P. Kozloff, Betsy M. Bryan, Lawrence M. Berman: Egypt's Dazzling Sun. Amenhotep III and his World. Cleveland Museum of Art, Cleveland 1992, ISBN 0-940717-17-4, p. 52.
