= Alphabet =

Set of letters used to write a given language

An alphabet is a writing system that uses a standard set of symbols called graphemes – more commonly known as letters – to more or less represent particular sounds in a spoken language. Specifically, these graphemes largely correspond to phonemes, which are the smallest sound segments that can distinguish one word from another in a given language. Not all writing systems represent language in this way: a syllabary assigns symbols to spoken syllables, while logographies assign symbols to words, morphemes, or other semantic units.

The first letters were invented in Ancient Egypt to serve as an aid in writing Egyptian hieroglyphs; these are referred to as Egyptian uniliteral signs by lexicographers. This system was used until the 5th century AD, and fundamentally differed by adding pronunciation hints to existing hieroglyphs that had previously carried no pronunciation information. Later on, these phonemic symbols were used to transcribe foreign words. The first fully phonemic script was the Proto-Sinaitic script, also descending from Egyptian hieroglyphs, which was later modified to create the Phoenician alphabet. The Phoenician system is considered the first true alphabet and is the ultimate ancestor of many modern scripts, including Arabic, Cyrillic, Greek, Hebrew, Latin, and possibly Brahmic.

Corresponding letters in the Phoenician and Latin alphabets

Peter T. Daniels distinguishes true alphabets—which use letters to represent both consonants and vowels—from both abugidas and abjads, which only need letters for consonants. Abugidas represent them with diacritics added to letters, while abjads generally lack vowel indicators altogether. In this narrower sense, the Greek alphabet was the first true alphabet; it was originally derived from the Phoenician alphabet, which was an abjad.

Alphabets usually have a standard ordering for their letters. This makes alphabets a useful tool in collation, as words can be listed in a well-defined order—commonly known as alphabetical order. This also means that letters may be used as a method of "numbering" ordered items. Some systems demonstrate acrophony, a phenomenon where letters have been given names distinct from their pronunciations. Systems with acrophony include Greek, Arabic, Hebrew, and Syriac; systems without include the Latin alphabet.

== Etymology ==
The English word alphabet came into Middle English from the Late Latin word alphabetum, which in turn originated in the Greek ἀλφάβητος alphábētos; it was made from the first two letters of the Greek alphabet, alpha (α) and beta (β). The names for the Greek letters, in turn, came from the first two letters of the Phoenician alphabet: aleph, the word for ox, and bet, the word for house.

== History ==
=== Alphabets related to Phoenician ===
==== Ancient Near Eastern alphabets ====
The Ancient Egyptian writing system had a set of some 24 hieroglyphs that are called uniliterals, which are glyphs that provide one sound. These glyphs were used as pronunciation guides for logograms, to write grammatical inflections, and, later, to transcribe loan words and foreign names. The script was used a fair amount in the 4th century AD. However, after pagan temples were closed down, it was forgotten in the 5th century until the discovery of the Rosetta Stone. There was also cuneiform, primarily used to write several ancient languages, including Sumerian. The last known use of cuneiform was in 75 AD, after which the script fell out of use. In the Middle Bronze Age, an apparently alphabetic system known as the Proto-Sinaitic script appeared in Egyptian turquoise mines in the Sinai Peninsula c. 1840 BC, apparently left by Canaanite workers. Orly Goldwasser has connected the illiterate turquoise miner graffiti theory to the origin of the alphabet. In 1999, American Egyptologists John and Deborah Darnell discovered an earlier version of this first alphabet at the Wadi el-Hol valley. The script dated to c. 1800 BC and shows evidence of having been adapted from specific forms of Egyptian hieroglyphs that could be dated to c. 2000 BC, strongly suggesting that the first alphabet had developed about that time. The script was based on letter appearances and names, believed to be based on Egyptian hieroglyphs. This script had no characters representing vowels. Originally, it probably was a syllabary—a script where syllables are represented with characters—with symbols that were not needed being removed. The best-attested Bronze Age alphabet is Ugaritic, invented in Ugarit before the 15th century BC. This was an alphabetic cuneiform script with 30 signs, including three that indicate the following vowel. This script was not used after the destruction of Ugarit in 1178 BC.

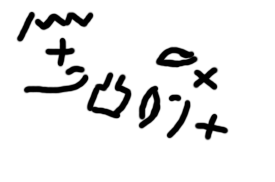
A specimen of the Proto-Sinaitic script, one of the earliest phonemic scripts

The Proto-Sinaitic script eventually developed into the Phoenician alphabet, conventionally called Proto-Canaanite, before c. 1050 BC. The oldest text in Phoenician script is an inscription on the sarcophagus of King Ahiram c. 1000 BC. This script is the parent script of all western alphabets. By the 10th century BC, two other forms distinguish themselves, Canaanite and Aramaic. The Aramaic gave rise to the Hebrew alphabet.

The South Arabian alphabet, a sister script to the Phoenician alphabet, is the script from which the Geʽez script was descended. Abugidas are writing systems with characters comprising consonant–vowel sequences. Alphabets without obligatory vowels are called abjads, with examples being Arabic, Hebrew, and Syriac. The omission of vowels was not always a satisfactory solution due to the need of preserving sacred texts. "Weak" consonants are used to indicate vowels. These letters have a dual function since they can also be used as pure consonants.

The Proto-Sinaitic script and the Ugaritic script were the first scripts with a limited number of signs instead of using many different signs for words, in contrast to cuneiform, Egyptian hieroglyphs, and Linear B. The Phoenician script was probably the first phonemic script, and it contained only about two dozen distinct letters, making it a script simple enough for traders to learn. Another advantage of the Phoenician alphabet was that it could write different languages since it recorded words phonemically.

The Phoenician script was spread across the Mediterranean by the Phoenicians. The Greek alphabet was the first in which vowels had independent letterforms separate from those of consonants. The Greeks chose letters representing sounds that did not exist in Greek to represent vowels. The Linear B syllabary, used by Mycenaean Greeks from the 16th century BC, had 87 symbols, including five vowels. In its early years, there were many variants of the Greek alphabet, causing many different alphabets to evolve from it.

==== European alphabets ====
Abecedarium latinum clasicum, or the Latin alphabet, used to write most languages of modern Europe, Africa, the Americas, and Oceania.

The Greek alphabet, in Euboean form, was carried over by Greek colonists to the Italian peninsula c. 800–600 BC giving rise to many different alphabets used to write the Italic languages, like the Etruscan alphabet. One of these became the Latin alphabet, which spread across Europe as the Romans expanded their republic. After the fall of the Western Roman Empire, the alphabet survived in intellectual and religious works. It came to be used for the Romance languages that descended from Latin and most of the other languages of western and central Europe. Today, it is the most widely used script in the world.

The Etruscan alphabet remained nearly unchanged for several hundred years. Only evolving once the Etruscan language changed itself. The letters used for non-existent phonemes were dropped. Afterwards, however, the alphabet went through many different changes. The final classical form of Etruscan contained 20 letters. Four of them are vowels—⟨a, e, i, u⟩—six fewer letters than the earlier forms. The script in its classical form was used until the 1st century AD. The Etruscan language itself was not used during the Roman Empire, but the script was used for religious texts.

Some adaptations of the Latin alphabet have ligatures, a combination of two letters make one, such as æ in Danish and Icelandic and ⟨Ȣ⟩ in Algonquian; borrowings from other alphabets, such as the thorn ⟨þ⟩ in Old English and Icelandic, which came from the Futhark runes; and modified existing letters, such as the eth ⟨ð⟩ of Old English and Icelandic, which is a modified d. Other alphabets only use a subset of the Latin alphabet, such as Hawaiian and Italian, which uses the letters j, k, x, y, and w only in foreign words.

Another notable script is Elder Fuþark, used from around 100 CE and ultimately derived from the Phoenician alphabet. Elder Fuþark, along with the Anglo-Frisian Fuþorc and Younger Fuþark that descend from it, are named after the first 6 runes typically found in inscriptions that list the runes in order. Surviving inscriptions are often on stone or metal, however inscriptions on organic material are found where conditions favoured preservation, such as the Bryggen inscriptions. These scripts were over time replaced with the Latin alphabet, although they are still used in limited contexts today, including in the works of J.R.R. Tolkien.

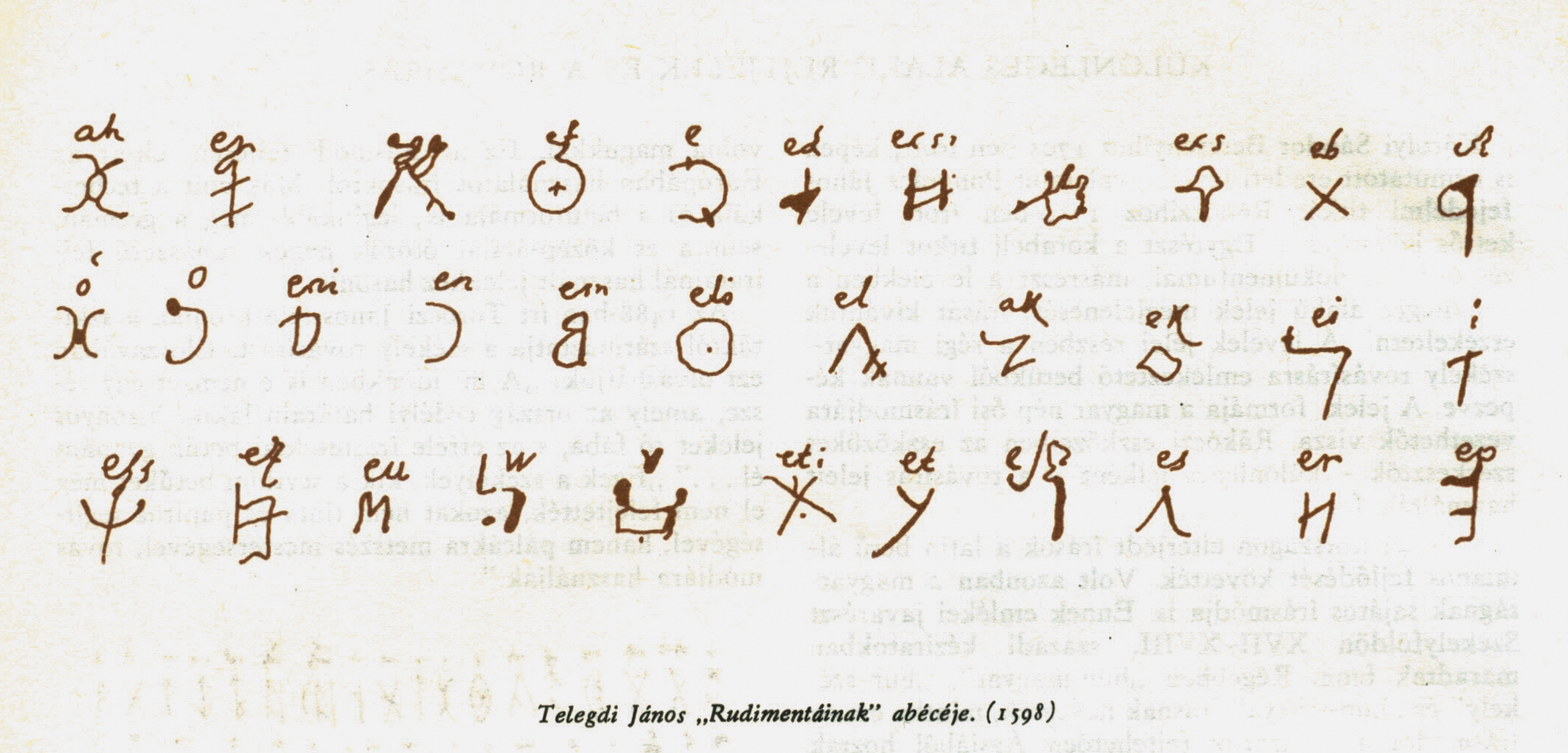
The Old Hungarian script alphabet.

The Old Hungarian script was the writing system of the Hungarians. It was in use during the entire history of Hungary, albeit not as an official writing system. From the 19th century, it once again became more and more popular.

The Glagolitic alphabet was the initial script of the liturgical language Old Church Slavonic and became, together with the Greek uncial script, the basis of the Cyrillic script. Cyrillic is one of the most widely used modern alphabetic scripts and is notable for its use in Slavic languages and also for other languages within the former Soviet Union. Cyrillic alphabets include Serbian, Macedonian, Bulgarian, Russian, Belarusian, and Ukrainian. The Glagolitic alphabet is believed to have been created by Saints Cyril and Methodius, while the Cyrillic alphabet was created by a circle of their disciples in the Preslav Literary School including Naum of Preslav, Constantine of Preslav, Chernorizets Hrabar among others. They feature many letters that appear to have been borrowed from or influenced by Greek and Hebrew.

==== Asian alphabets ====
Many phonetic scripts exist in Asia. The Arabic alphabet, Hebrew alphabet, Syriac alphabet, and other abjads of the Middle East are developments of the Aramaic alphabet.

Most alphabetic scripts of India and Eastern Asia descend from the Brahmi script, believed to be a descendant of Aramaic.

European alphabets, especially Latin and Cyrillic, have been adapted for many languages of Asia. Arabic is also widely used, sometimes as an abjad, as with Urdu and Persian, and sometimes as a complete alphabet, as with Kurdish and Uyghur.

===== Hangul =====
In Korea, Sejong the Great created the Hangul alphabet in 1443. Hangul is a unique alphabet: it is a featural alphabet, where the design of many of the letters comes from a sound's place of articulation, like P looking like the widened mouth and L looking like the tongue pulled in. The creation of Hangul was planned by the government of the day, and it places individual letters in syllable clusters with equal dimensions, in the same way as Chinese characters. This change allows for mixed-script writing, where one syllable always takes up one type space no matter how many letters get stacked into building that one sound-block.

== Types ==
A Venn diagram showing the Greek (left), Cyrillic (bottom) and Latin (right) alphabets, which share many of the same letters, although they have different pronunciations.

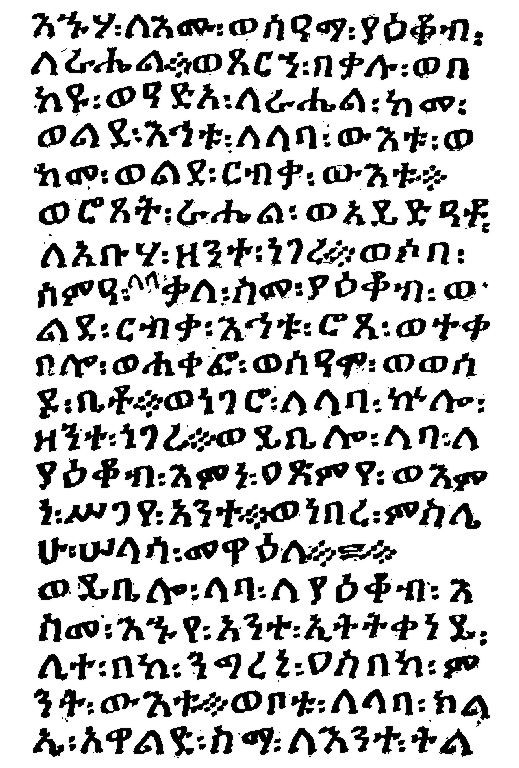
Geʽez script of Ethiopia and Eritrea.

The term "alphabet" is used by linguists and paleographers in both a wide and a narrow sense. In its broader sense, an alphabet is a segmental script at the phoneme level—that is, it has separate glyphs for individual sounds and not for larger units such as syllables or words. In its narrower sense, some scholars distinguish "true" alphabets from two other types of segmental script: abjads and abugidas. These three differ in how they treat vowels. Abjads have letters for consonants and leave most vowels unexpressed. Abugidas are also consonant-based but indicate vowels with diacritics, a systematic graphic modification of the consonants. The earliest known alphabet using this sense is the Wadi el-Hol script, believed to be an abjad. Its successor, Phoenician, is the ancestor of modern alphabets, including Arabic, Greek, Latin (via the Old Italic alphabet), Cyrillic (via the Greek alphabet), and Hebrew (via Aramaic).

Examples of present-day abjads are the Arabic and Hebrew scripts; true alphabets include Latin, Cyrillic, and Korean hangul; and abugidas, used to write Tigrinya, Amharic, Hindi, and Thai. The Canadian Aboriginal syllabics are also an abugida, rather than a syllabary, as their name would imply, because each glyph stands for a consonant and is modified by rotation to represent the following vowel. In a true syllabary, each consonant-vowel combination gets represented by a separate glyph.

All three types may be augmented with syllabic glyphs. Ugaritic, for example, is essentially an abjad but has syllabic letters for /ʔa, ʔi, ʔu/ These are the only times that vowels are indicated. Coptic has a letter for /ti/. Devanagari is typically an abugida augmented with dedicated letters for initial vowels, though some traditions use अ as a zero consonant as the graphic base for such vowels.

The boundaries between the three types of segmental scripts are not always clear-cut. For example, Sorani Kurdish is written in the Arabic script, which, when used for other languages, is an abjad. In Kurdish, writing the vowels is mandatory, and whole letters are used, so the script is a true alphabet. Other languages may use a Semitic abjad with forced vowel diacritics, effectively making them abugidas. On the other hand, the ʼPhags-pa script of the Mongol Empire was based closely on the Tibetan abugida, but vowel marks are written after the preceding consonant rather than as diacritic marks. The short a is not written in the Geʽez script now used for Amharic and Tigrinya, unlike the Indic abugidas; the source of the term "abugida" assimilating the short a vowel into its consonant modifications made the abugida no longer systematic, and by definition, a syllabary rather than a segmental script. Even more extreme, the Pahlavi abjad eventually became logographic.

Thus the primary categorisation of alphabets reflects how they treat vowels. For tonal languages, further classification can be based on their treatment of tone. Though names do not yet exist to distinguish the various types. Some alphabets disregard tone entirely, especially when it does not carry a heavy functional load, as in Somali and many other languages of Africa and the Americas. Most commonly, tones are indicated by diacritics, which is how vowels are treated in abugidas, which is the case for Vietnamese (a true alphabet) and Thai (an abugida). In Thai, the tone is determined primarily by a consonant, with diacritics for disambiguation. In the Pollard script, an abugida, vowels are indicated by diacritics. The placing of the diacritic relative to the consonant is modified to indicate the tone. More rarely, a script may have separate letters for tones, as is the case for Hmong and Zhuang. For many, regardless of whether letters or diacritics get used, the most common tone is not marked, just as the most common vowel is not marked in Indic abugidas. In Zhuyin, not only is one of the tones unmarked; but there is a diacritic to indicate a lack of tone, like the virama of Indic.

== Alphabetical order ==
Alphabets often come to be associated with a standard ordering of their letters; this is for collation—namely, for listing words and other items in "alphabetical order."

=== Latin alphabets ===
The ordering of the Latin alphabet (A B C D E F G H I J K L M N O P Q R S T U V W X Y Z), which derives from the Northwest Semitic "Abgad" order, is already well established. Although, languages using this alphabet have different conventions for their treatment of modified letters (such as the French é, à, and ô) and certain combinations of letters (multigraphs). In French, these are not considered to be additional letters for collation. However, in Icelandic, the accented letters such as á, í, and ö are considered distinct letters representing different vowel sounds from sounds represented by their unaccented counterparts. In Spanish, ñ is considered a separate letter, but accented vowels such as á and é are not. The ll and ch were also formerly considered single letters and sorted separately after l and c, but in 1994, the tenth congress of the Association of Spanish Language Academies changed the collating order so that ll came to be sorted between lk and lm in the dictionary and ch came to be sorted between cg and ci; those digraphs were still formally designated as letters, but in 2010 the Real Academia Española changed it, so they are no longer considered letters at all.

In German, words starting with sch- (which spells the German phoneme /ʃ/) are inserted between words with initial sca- and sci- (all incidentally loanwords) instead of appearing after the initial sz, as though it were a single letter, which contrasts several languages such as Albanian, in which dh-, ë-, gj-, ll-, rr-, th-, xh-, and zh-, which all represent phonemes and considered separate single letters, would follow the letters ⟨d, e, g, l, n, r, t, x, z⟩ respectively, as well as Hungarian and Welsh. Further, German words with an umlaut get collated ignoring the umlaut as—contrary to Turkish, which adopted the graphemes ö and ü, and where a word like tüfek would come after tuz, in the dictionary. An exception is the German telephone directory, where umlauts are sorted like ä=ae since names such as Jäger also appear with the spelling Jaeger and are not distinguished in the spoken language.

The Danish and Norwegian alphabets end with ⟨æ, ø, å⟩, whereas the Swedish conventionally put ⟨å, ä, ö⟩ at the end. However, ⟨æ⟩ phonetically corresponds with ⟨ä⟩, as does ⟨ø⟩ and ⟨ö⟩.

=== Early alphabets ===
It is unknown whether the earliest alphabets had a defined sequence. Some alphabets today, such as the Hanuno'o script, are learned one letter at a time, in no particular order, and are not used for collation where a definite order is required. However, a dozen Ugaritic tablets from the 14th century BC preserve the alphabet in two sequences. One, the ABCDE order later used in Phoenician, has continued with minor changes in Hebrew, Greek, Armenian, Gothic, Cyrillic, and Latin; the other, HLĦM, was used in southern Arabia and is preserved today in Geʽez. Both orders have therefore been stable for at least 3000 years.

Elder Fuþark runes had unrelated sequences beginning in "Fuþark", which got simplified later on in Younger Fuþark and expanded in Anglo-Frisian Fuþorc. Arabic usually uses its sequence, although Arabic retains the traditional abjadi order, which is used for numbers.

The Brahmic family of alphabets used in India uses a unique order based on phonology: the letters are arranged according to how and where the sounds are produced in the mouth. This organization is present in Southeast Asia, Tibet, Korean hangul, and even Japanese kana, which is not an alphabet.

== Acrophony ==
In Phoenician, each letter got associated with a word that begins with that sound. This is called acrophony and is still used to varying degrees in Samaritan, Aramaic, Syriac, Hebrew, Greek, and Arabic.

Acrophony was abandoned in Latin. It referred to the letters by adding a vowel—usually ⟨e⟩, sometimes ⟨a⟩ or ⟨u⟩—before or after the consonant. Two exceptions were Y and Z, which were borrowed from the Greek alphabet rather than Etruscan. They were known as Y Graeca "Greek Y" and zeta (from Greek)—this discrepancy was inherited by many European languages, as in the term zed for Z in all forms of English, other than American English. Over time names sometimes shifted or were added, as in double U for W, or "double V" in French, the English name for Y, and the American zee for Z. Comparing them in English and French gives a clear reflection of the Great Vowel Shift: A, B, C, and D are pronounced /eɪ, biː, siː, diː/ in today's English, but in contemporary French they are /a, be, se, de/. The French names (from which the English names got derived) preserve the qualities of the English vowels before the Great Vowel Shift. By contrast, the names of F, L, M, N, and S (/ɛf, ɛl, ɛm, ɛn, ɛs/) remain the same in both languages because "short" vowels were largely unaffected by the Shift.

In Cyrillic, originally, acrophony was present using Slavic words. The first three words going, azŭ, buky, vědě, with the Cyrillic collation order being, А, Б, В. However, this was later abandoned in favour of a system similar to Latin.

== Orthography and pronunciation ==
When an alphabet is adopted or developed to represent a given language, an orthography generally comes into being, providing rules for spelling words, following the principle on which alphabets get based. These rules will map letters of the alphabet to the phonemes of the spoken language. In a perfectly phonemic orthography, there would be a consistent one-to-one correspondence between the letters and the phonemes so that a writer could predict the spelling of a word given its pronunciation, and a speaker would always know the pronunciation of a word given its spelling, and vice versa. However, this ideal is usually never achieved in practice. Languages can come close to it, such as Spanish and Finnish. Others, such as English, deviate from it to a much larger degree.

The pronunciation of a language often evolves independently of its writing system. Writing systems have been borrowed for languages the orthography was not initially made to use. The degree to which letters of an alphabet correspond to phonemes of a language varies.

Languages may fail to achieve a one-to-one correspondence between letters and sounds in any of several ways:

- A language may represent a given phoneme by combinations of letters rather than just a single letter. Two-letter combinations are called digraphs, and three-letter groups are called trigraphs. German uses the tetragraphs (four letters) "tsch" for the phoneme German pronunciation: [tʃ] and (in a few borrowed words) "dsch" for [dʒ]. Kabardian also uses a tetragraph for one of its phonemes, namely "кхъу" for [q͡χʷ]. Two (or more) letters representing one sound occur in several instances in Hungarian as well (where, for instance, cs stands for [tʃ], sz for [s], zs for [ʒ], dzs for [dʒ]).
- A language may represent the same phoneme with two or more different letters or combinations of letters. An example is modern Greek which may write the phoneme Greek pronunciation: [i] in six different ways: ⟨ι⟩, ⟨η⟩, ⟨υ⟩, ⟨ει⟩, ⟨οι⟩, and ⟨υι⟩.
- A language may spell some words with unpronounced letters that exist for historical or other reasons. For example, the spelling of the Thai word for 'beer' เบียร์ retains a letter for the final consonant /r/ present in the English word it borrows, but silences it.
- Pronunciation of individual words may change according to the presence of surrounding words in a sentence, for example, in sandhi.
- Different dialects of a language may use different phonemes for the same word.
- A language may use different sets of symbols or rules for distinct vocabulary items, typically for foreign words. For example, the Japanese katakana syllabary is used for foreign words, and there are rules in English for using loanwords from other languages.

National languages sometimes elect to address the problem of dialects by associating the alphabet with the national standard. Some national languages like Finnish, Armenian, Turkish, Russian, Serbo-Croatian (Serbian, Croatian, and Bosnian), and Bulgarian have a very regular spelling system with nearly one-to-one correspondence between letters and phonemes. Similarly, the Italian verb corresponding to 'spell (out),' compitare, is unknown to many Italians because spelling is usually trivial, as Italian spelling is highly phonemic. In standard Spanish, one can tell the pronunciation of a word from its spelling, but not vice versa, as phonemes sometimes can be represented in more than one way, but a given letter is consistently pronounced. French using silent letters, nasal vowels, and elision, may seem to lack much correspondence between the spelling and pronunciation. However, its rules on pronunciation, though complex, are consistent and predictable with a fair degree of accuracy.

At the other extreme are languages such as English, where spellings mostly have to be memorized as they do not correspond to the pronunciations consistently. For English, this is because the Great Vowel Shift occurred after the orthography got established and because English has acquired a large number of loanwords at different times, retaining their original spelling at varying levels. However, even English has general, albeit complex, rules that predict pronunciation from spelling. Rules like this are usually successful. However, rules to predict spelling from pronunciation have a higher failure rate.

Sometimes, countries have the written language undergo a spelling reform to realign the writing with the contemporary spoken language. These can range from simple spelling changes and word forms to switching the entire writing system. For example, Turkey switched from the Arabic alphabet to a Latin-based Turkish alphabet, and Kazakh changed from an Arabic script to a Cyrillic script due to the Soviet Union's influence. Kazakhstan is in the process of transitioning its official writing script to the Latin alphabet after making a version of it in 2021. The Cyrillic script used to be official in Uzbekistan and Turkmenistan before they switched to the Latin alphabet. Uzbekistan is reforming the alphabet to use diacritics on the letters that are marked by apostrophes and the letters that are digraphs.

The standard system of symbols used by linguists to represent sounds in any language, independently of orthography, is called the International Phonetic Alphabet.

== See also ==
- Abecedarium
- Alphabet book
- Alphabet effect
- Fingerspelling
- Pangram
- Letter symbolism
