= Meryre II =

Ancient Egyptian official

Coordinates: 27.6617°N 30.9056°E

- Steward of Queen Nefertiti
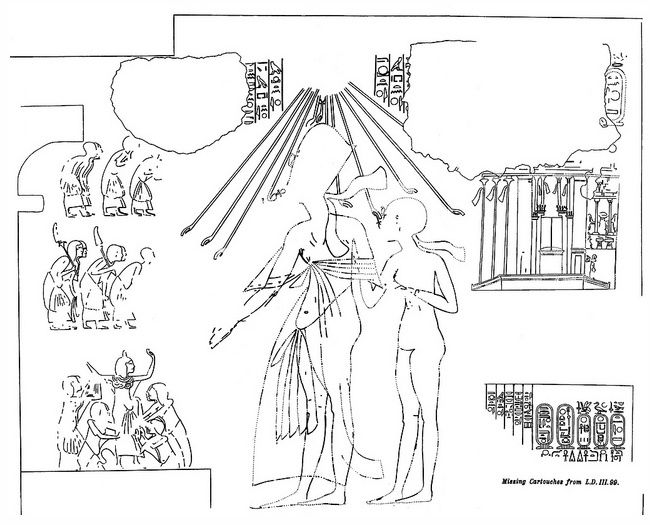
- Meryre before Smenkhkare and Meritaten.
Egyptian name
N5 N37 i i A51
- Dynasty: 18th Dynasty
- Pharaoh: Akhenaten
- Burial: Amarna Tomb 2

Meryre II was an ancient Egyptian noble known as the superintendent of Queen Nefertiti, and held the title of royal scribe, steward, overseer of the two treasuries, overseer of the royal harem of Nefertiti. He had a tomb constructed at Amarna, although his remains have never been identified. The tomb has the last dated appearance of Akhenaten and the Amarna family.

== Tomb of Meryre II ==
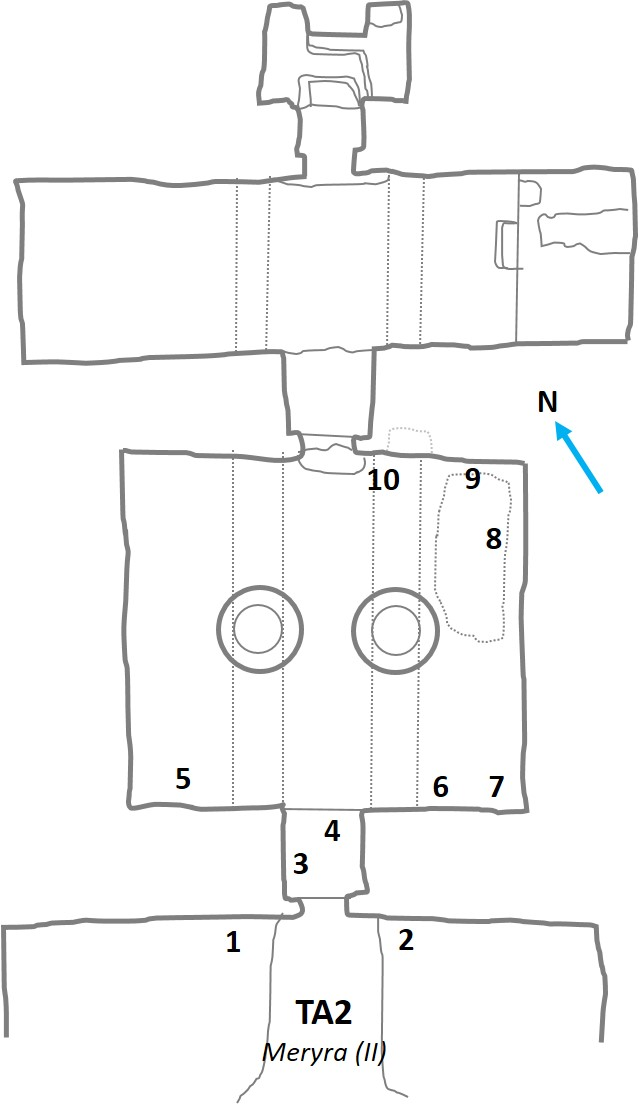
Plan of the tomb of Meryra II

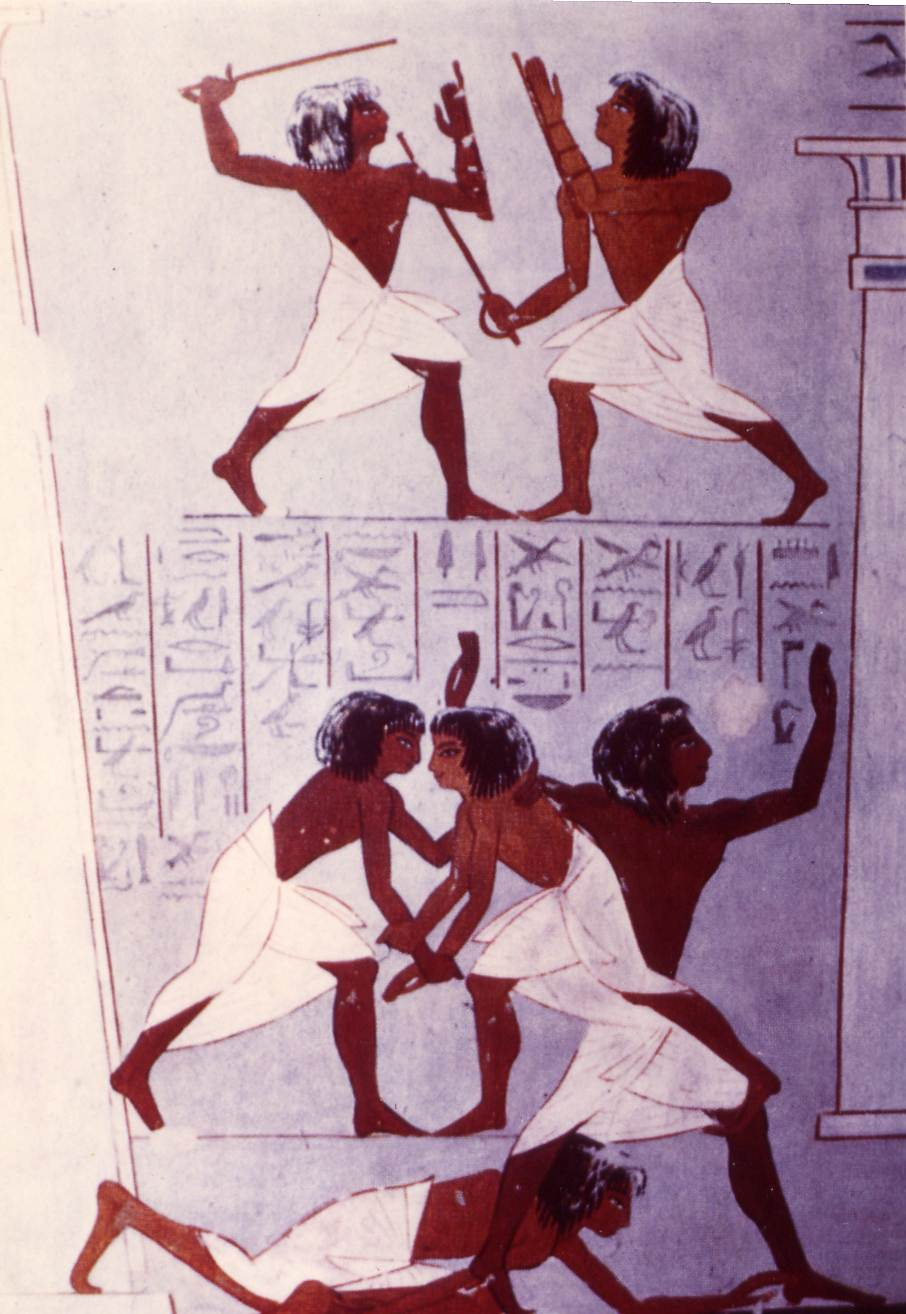
Stick fighting scene in the tomb of Meryre II

The tomb of Meryre II is the royal sepulcher known as Amarna Tomb 2. The tomb dates back to the 18th Dynasty. It is located in the northern side of the wadi that splits the cluster of tombs known collectively as the Northern tombs, near to the city of Amarna, Egypt. The tomb has been largely destroyed. It was decorated with the last dated appearance of Akhenaten and the Amarna family, dating from the second month, year 12 of his reign. Norman de Garis Davies originally published details of the tomb in 1905.

=== Inscribed scenes ===
==== South wall, west side: the queen filling the king's cup ====
Nefertiti is shown standing before a seated Akhenaten, pouring a drink through a sieve for the king. Meritaten stands between Akhenaten and Nefertiti, facing her father and offering him something. Behind Nefertiti we see Meketaten offering a perfume cone, while Ankhesenpaaten offers a bouquet of flowers. Below this scene we see female musicians and male servants.

==== South wall, east side: reward of Meryra ====
Meryre is shown before the window of appearance. Akhenaten and Nefertiti are shown handing out collars of gold. In the palace behind the window we see Meritaten and Meketaten handing gold collars to their mother. Ankhesenpaaten is shown standing before Neferneferuaten Tasherit and Neferneferure. Ankhesenpaaten is shown wearing large earrings and three bracelets on each arm. She also appears to be wearing a rather elaborate cape or collar.

==== East wall: presentation of tribute ====
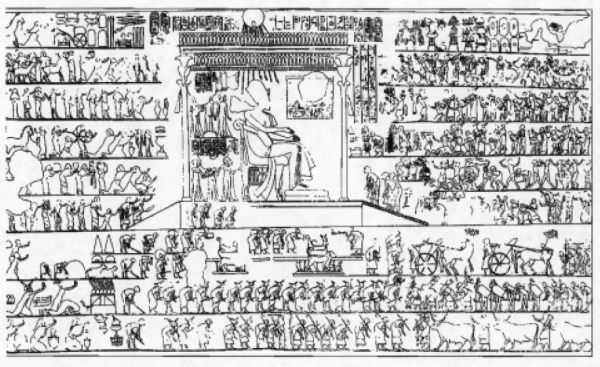
Tribute scene

On the east wall of the main chamber is a scene depicting the tribute of 'the chieftains of every foreign land'. Akhenaten and Nefertiti are shown sitting on a throne in a kiosk with all six of their daughters standing behind them. This tribute is dated to regnal year 12, second month of the Seed season, day 8. Their six daughters are shown behind them. Meritaten, Meketaten and Ankhesenpaaten are shown holding hands. Neferneferuaten is holding something in her hands. Neferure is shown holding a gazelle. The youngest daughter, Setepenre, holds a bouquet of flowers while petting the gazelle her older sister is holding.

==== North wall, east side: Meryre rewarded by the king ====
Meryre is shown before "The Lord of the Two Lands (Ankheperure), Son of Re (Smenkhkare Djeser-Kheperu), and the Great Royal Wife (Meritaten)." The scene shows the royal couple bestowing honors and gifts on Meryre. The scene appears on the wall adjacent to the wall depicting the Durbar of year 12. Smenkhkare may have served as a co-regent to Akhenaten. Meritaten was the Great Royal Wife to Smenkhare, while Nefertiti continued as the chief consort of Akhenaten. Nefertiti still held the Great Royal Wife title in year 16, hence Smenkhkare must have been a co-regent or otherwise ruled with his wife Meritaten sometime after year 16 of Akhenaten.

== See also ==
- Meryre (treasurer)
- Meryre (given name)
