= Meryre (given name) =

ra mr i i A1
Meryre
in hieroglyphs

Meryre or Meryra (“Beloved of Ra”) was an ancient Egyptian male name, occurring both as a personal and as a throne name. A variant is Merenre, the female version is Merytre. Famous bearers were:

== As a personal name ==
- Meryre, treasurer under Amenhotep III, tutor of Prince Siatum (18th dynasty)
- Meryre, High Priest of Aten (18th dynasty)
- Meryre, steward of the royal harem in Amarna (18th dynasty)
- Meryre, a son of Ramesses II and Nefertari, 11th on the list of princes
- Meryre, another son of Ramesses II, possibly named after the first Meryre; 18th on the list of princes

== As a throne name ==
- Pepi I (Meryre)
- Nemtyemsaf I (Merenre)
- Nemtyemsaf II (Merenre)
