= Ameny (high steward) =

Egyptian official

- High steward
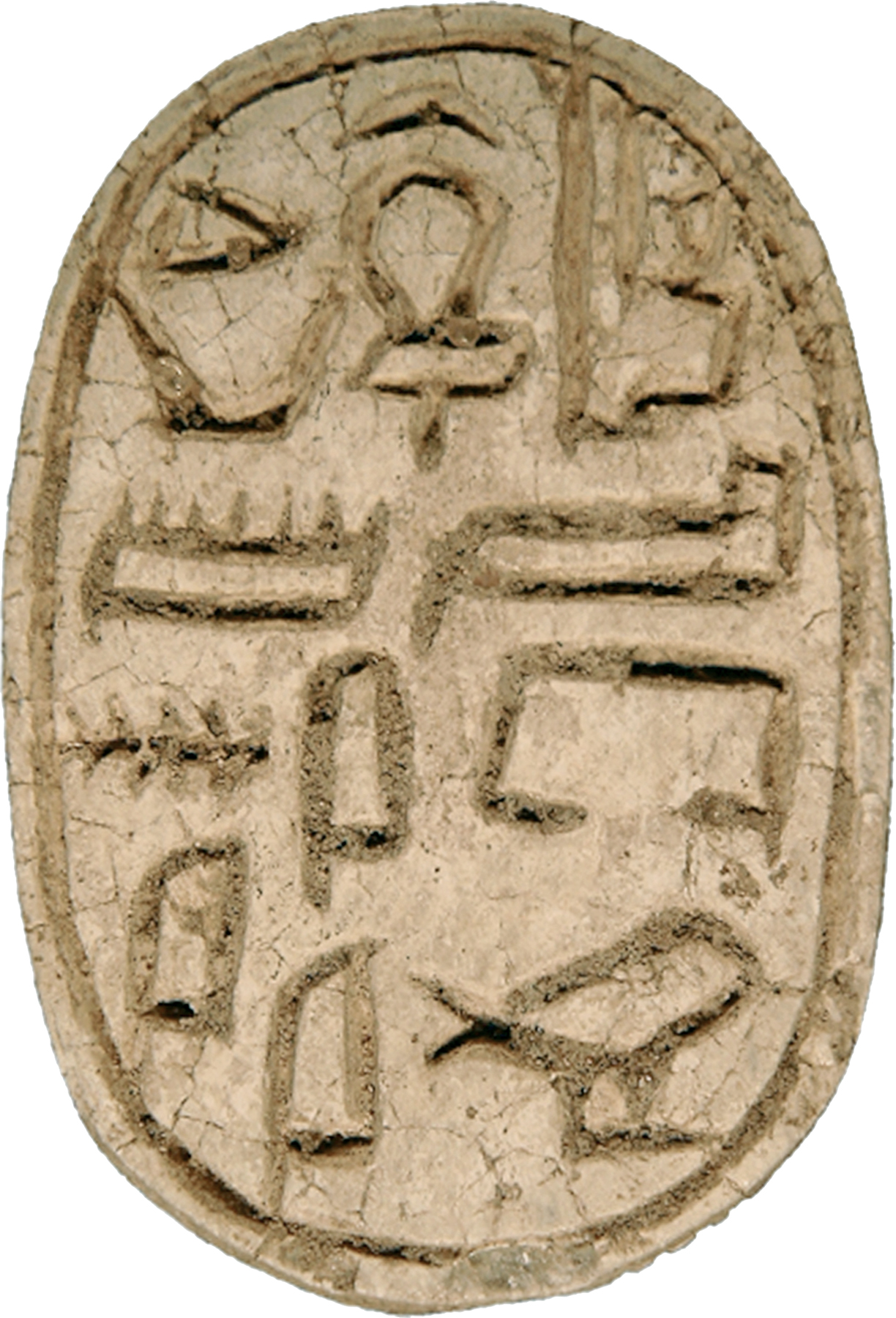
- Scarab seal of Ameny
- Dynasty: 13th dynasty
- Father: Tahaa
- Mother: Lady of the House Kemtet

Ameny was an ancient Egyptian official of the 13th Dynasty with the title high steward. In this function he was the main administrator of the royal estates.

== Attestation ==
Ameny (PD 98) is known from several stelae, a statue and from scarabs. Ameny's father was a certain Tahaa and his mother the lady of the house Kemtet. Not much is known about them.

=== High Steward ===
As high steward, Ameny was, after the visier and treasurer, the most important official at the royal court. On some of his monuments, he appears with important ranking titles, such as member of the elite, foremost of action and royal sealer. On one stela in a private collection, he appears next to the treasurer Senebsumai. The latter is well datable into the middle of the 13th Dynasty, also providing a fixed point for the date of Ameny.

Statue, Abydos II | At Abydos, a Statue Man Seated on the Ground owned by Ameny at the Temple of Osiris. Also mention his parents.

Stela, Cairo CG 20101 | At Abydos, a limestone round-topped stela owned by Ameny at the North Cemetery. In addition to the title high steward, he is also governor. It also mentions his mother. Workshop: 13th Dyn. Memphis-Faiyum Workshop 3, which also produced monuments for Senebsumai and Senbi.

Stela, Cairo CG 20562 | At Abydos, a limestone round-topped stela owned by Ameny at the North Cemetery. In addition to the title high steward, he is also governor.

- Stela, Cairo CG 20015
- Seal, Cairo JE 75087
- Stela, Roccati, Gs Berlev no.1
- Stela, Roccati, Gs Berlev no.2
- Seal, Walters 42.21
