= Senebsumai =

Egyptian official

- High steward, Treasurer
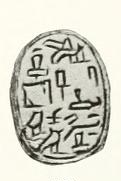
- Scarab seal of Senebsumai from Kahun
Egyptian name
s n b sw w m a Z1
- Successor: Senebi?
- Dynasty: 13th dynasty
- Father: Wepwawethotep (wp-wꜣwt-ḥtp)
- Mother: Serukh-ib (srwḫ-jb) Lady of the House

Senebsumai was an ancient Egyptian official of the early 13th Dynasty with the title high steward and later treasurer.

== Family ==
=== Parents ===
His mother was Serukhib (srwḫ-jb) with the title Lady of the House (nbt pr). The maternal grandparents were the woman jjs-nbw/mnw-wn and nbw-kꜢw-rꜤ (a name referring to the prenomen of Amenemhat II). His maternal uncle was jjj-Ꜥḏ who held the title scribe of the books (sẖꜢ mḏꜢwt).

His father was Wepwawethotep (wp-wꜣwt-ḥtp) with unknown titles.

=== Children ===
His son may be Pepi (pjpj) with title chamber-keeper (jrj-ꜥt) and cupbearer (wdpw) whose mother was a certain psš(w).

== Attestation ==
Senebsumai is known from a remarkable series of monuments, the preservation of which makes him the best attested Egyptian official of the early 13th dynasty. There are thirty scarabs attesting to Senebsumai, which is also the highest number of seals found for a thirteenth dynasty official. All of these finds reinforce an understanding of his longevity in offices held and the respect given to him.

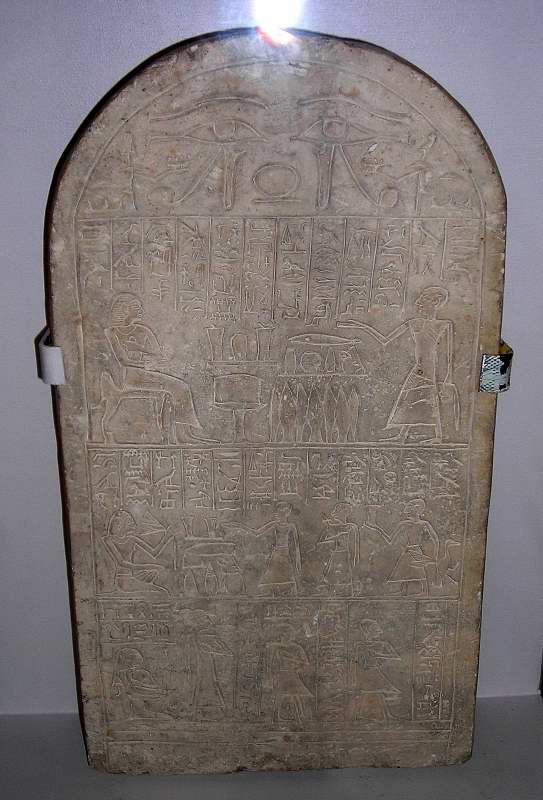
Stela showing Senebsumai, seated on the left, and his servant, Horiwah, motioning before him

Twelve stelae in Abydos reference Senebsumai. Most of the stelae show Senebsumai with other, lower officials in scenes depicting them as they performed work for him. Senebsuma son of Serukh-ib is known from four stelae, three in the Cairo Museum (CG20075, CG20334, CG20459), and one in the British Museum (EA252). Stela Turin Cat. S. 1303, belongs to the treasurer Senebsumai and is dedicated to him by the 'master of the house for the palace' Khentikhety-hotep. At Abydos, Senebsumai is mentioned on stelae belonging to subordinates: Cairo CG 20334, Pittsburgh 2983–6701, London BM EA 252, Roanne Musée Déchelette 163, London BM EA 215, Cairo CG 20718, Turin S.1298, Leiden AP 2, Rome Sinopoli collection Egi06, and St. Petersburg 1084.

Several other artifacts have been discovered at important Ancient Egyptian sites that are associated with Senebsumai. Fragments of accounts mentioning him were found in El-Lahun. A bronze statue of him was found at Hawara, a site associated with Amenemhat III. A relief or a coffin fragment with coffin texts bearing his name and titles is recorded from finds at Dahshur.

== Career ==
The earliest known records of his career identify Senebsumai as high steward; later he became treasurer.

=== High Steward ===
As high steward, Senebsumai worked under the treasurer. In this function he was the main administrator of the royal estates.

=== Treasurer ===
As treasurer, Senebsumai would have been among the highest officials in the land. He also held ranking titles like Royal Sealer and Sole Companion. An important colleague of treasurer Senebsumai was the high steward Ameny. Senebsumai died while holding this office and seems to have been succeeded by treasurer Senebi.

== Literature ==
- Herman de Meulenaere: Les monuments d'un haut dignitaire de la 13e dynastie, In: Chronique d'Égypte, Bulletin périodique de la Fondation Egyptologique Reine Elisabeth, 60 (1985), S. 75 - 84
