= Ugaritic (Unicode block) =

- Range: U+10380..U+1039F (32 code points)
- Plane: SMP
- Scripts: Ugaritic
- Major alphabets: Ugaritic; Hurrian
- Assigned: 31 code points
- Unused: 1 reserved code points

Unicode version history
- 4.0 (2003): 31 (+31)

Unicode documentation
- Code chart ∣ Web page

Ugaritic is a Unicode block containing cuneiform alphabetic characters for writing the Ugaritic and Hurrian languages of the Ugarit city-state from the 15th-12th centuries BCE.

Some of the Unicode character names are reconstructions, and as such are not found in Ugaritic source texts.

Ugaritic^{[1]}^{[2]} Official Unicode Consortium code chart (PDF)
| | 0 | 1 | 2 | 3 | 4 | 5 | 6 | 7 | 8 | 9 | A | B | C | D | E | F |
| U+1038x | 𐎀 | 𐎁 | 𐎂 | 𐎃 | 𐎄 | 𐎅 | 𐎆 | 𐎇 | 𐎈 | 𐎉 | 𐎊 | 𐎋 | 𐎌 | 𐎍 | 𐎎 | 𐎏 |
| U+1039x | 𐎐 | 𐎑 | 𐎒 | 𐎓 | 𐎔 | 𐎕 | 𐎖 | 𐎗 | 𐎘 | 𐎙 | 𐎚 | 𐎛 | 𐎜 | 𐎝 | | 𐎟 |
Notes: 1. As of Unicode version 16.0; 2. Grey area indicates non-assigned code point

== History ==
The following Unicode-related documents record the purpose and process of defining specific characters in the Ugaritic block:

| Version | Final code points (Note: Proposed code points and characters names may differ from final code points and names) | Count | L2 ID | WG2 ID | Document |
|---|---|---|---|---|---|
| 4.0 | U+10380..1039D, 1039F | 31 | L2/97-270 | N1640 | Everson, Michael (1997-09-18), Proposal to encode Ugaritic Cuneiform, Plane 1 |
| 4.0 | U+10380..1039D, 1039F | 31 | L2/98-070 | | Aliprand, Joan; Winkler, Arnold, "3.A.4. item d. Ugaritic Cuneiform", Minutes of the joint UTC and L2 meeting from the meeting in Cupertino, February 25-27, 1998 |
| 4.0 | U+10380..1039D, 1039F | 31 | L2/98-286 | N1703 | Umamaheswaran, V. S.; Ksar, Mike (1998-07-02), "8.19", Unconfirmed Meeting Minutes, WG 2 Meeting #34, Redmond, WA, USA; 1998-03-16--20 |
| 4.0 | U+10380..1039D, 1039F | 31 | L2/00-128 | | Bunz, Carl-Martin (2000-03-01), Scripts from the Past in Future Versions of Unicode |
| 4.0 | U+10380..1039D, 1039F | 31 | L2/01-141 | N2338 | Everson, Michael (2001-04-01), Proposal to encode Ugaritic in the UCS |
| 4.0 | U+10380..1039D, 1039F | 31 | L2/01-184R | | Moore, Lisa (2001-06-18), "Motion 87-M7", Minutes from the UTC/L2 meeting |
| 4.0 | U+10380..1039D, 1039F | 31 | L2/01-344 | N2353 (pdf, doc) | Umamaheswaran, V. S. (2001-09-09), "8.6 Ugaritic", Minutes from SC2/WG2 meeting #40 -- Mountain View, April 2001 |
