= Halaḥam =

Ancient letter order of the South Semitic alphabets

Halaḥam (also halḥam or HLḤM), sometimes called the South Semitic letter order, is one of the two ancient canonical orders of the letters of the Semitic abjads. Its name is formed from the first four letters of the sequence, h, l, ḥ and m. The halaḥam became the standard sequence of the ancient North and South Arabian scripts and of the classical Ethiopic abugida, while the other canonical order, beginning ʾ, b, g (the abgad), became the standard for the Canaanite alphabets of the first millennium BCE and passed through the Phoenicians to the Greek and Latin alphabets.

Both orders are attested in alphabetic cuneiform tablets from Ugarit of the 13th century BCE. Recent research suggests an earlier witness to the halaḥam is a limestone ostracon of the 15th century BCE from the Theban tomb TT99 in Egypt, identified in 2015 by the Egyptologist Ben Haring, who describes it as the earliest known evidence of alphabetical ordering anywhere.

== Sequence ==
The canonical halaḥam as attested in the Ancient South Arabian script, which has 29 letters, runs:

h l ḥ m q w s² r b t s¹ k n ḫ ṣ s³ f ʾ ʿ ḍ g d ġ ṭ z ḏ y ṯ ẓ

The Ugaritic and Ancient North Arabian abecedaries follow the same sequence in outline but differ in detail, and several variant orders are attested in the North Arabian scripts.

Some abecedaries divide the sequence into short groups. One from Nafūn, near Duqm in Oman, separates the letters with word dividers into seven blocks: hlḥmq, ws²rbt, s¹kn, fḫʾ, ʿḍg, dġṭ, and a final block of four letters. A Dhofari abecedary sets out the same groups in separate columns, with two of them in exchanged positions. The epigrapher Ahmad Al-Jallad takes this as evidence of a shared mnemonic in which the letters were clustered into pronounceable pseudo-words, comparable to the Arabic abjad hawwaz mnemonic of the abjad numerals. In a 2026 study, Al-Jallad and Alessia Prioletta reconstructed three stable initial clusters across the Ancient North Arabian corpora, hlḥmq, ws²rbt and s¹kn. They argued that these "letter families" served as acrophonic mnemonics and that the halaḥam was the organizing principle of the first alphabet.

== Attestations ==
=== Levant, 13th century BCE ===
At Ugarit, an abecedary in the halaḥam order, RS 88.2215, was found in 1988 in the French excavations at Ras Shamra. It was published by Pierre Bordreuil and Dennis Pardee in 1995.

A clay tablet in alphabetic cuneiform found at Tel Beth Shemesh in 1933, during the fifth season of the Haverford College excavations, is the earliest known alphabetic cuneiform text from the southern Levant. Its contents remained obscure until a reading by Émile Puech showed that it followed the South Semitic order, which A. G. Loundine confirmed in 1987. The tablet is written from right to left, unlike the usual left-to-right direction of cuneiform, and is nearly identical to the Ugarit halaḥam abecedary.

Petrographic analysis published in 2024 indicated that the clay came from the Beth Shemesh area. The tablet also has a misshapen form, several scribal corrections and a child's fingerprint impressed in the clay. On that basis the researchers interpreted it as a school exercise and as evidence of alphabetic cuneiform scribal training outside Ugarit.

=== Arabia ===
Abecedaries engraved on slabs, rocks and stones at Timnaʿ and Maʾrib in Yemen and at al-ʿUla and Tayma in Saudi Arabia confirmed that the Ancient South Arabian script followed an order different from that of the Phoenician alphabet. In 2015 Al-Jallad and al-Manaser published the first known abecedary in Thamudic B, which follows the South Semitic order. A Dadanitic abecedary (JSLih 152) is also known.

In 2025 Al-Jallad identified three halaḥam abecedaries in the previously undeciphered Dhofari script of Dhofar and neighbouring regions of Oman and Yemen. Two came from the corpus recorded by Al-Shaḥrī and King in 1991 and 1992; the third came from Nafūn near Duqm. He used them to decipher the variant he labels Script 1a.

=== Late Egypt ===
The halaḥam also appears in Egyptian hieratic and demotic texts from the 4th century BCE onward. Joachim Friedrich Quack has argued that this later Egyptian sequence, thought to comprise twenty-five consonants, was inspired by the Ancient Arabian tradition. Frank Kammerzell had earlier considered a much older native Egyptian tradition. In the extant demotic halaḥam texts, both Semitic l and Semitic r are written as r, although demotic had a separate sign for l.

=== Ethiopia ===
The order survives in the Geʽez script, the classical Ethiopic syllabary, whose sequence begins ሀ ለ ሐ መ (hä, lä, ḥä, mä).

== Ongoing research ==
=== Egypt, 15th century BCE ===
Ostracon 99.95.0297 is a small limestone flake found by the British Egyptologist Nigel Strudwick during the Cambridge Theban Tombs Project's excavations of TT99. This was the tomb of the treasurer Senneferi, who lived under Thutmose III. The ostracon came from secondary deposits in a shaft cut into the tomb after the New Kingdom, so its connection with Senneferi is uncertain, but its hieratic palaeography points to the Eighteenth Dynasty.

It preserves seven lines on the obverse and six on the reverse. Each line gives a word in hieratic followed by a sign resembling a cursive hieroglyph. The first four lines of the obverse are complete and follow the order h-l-ḥ-m. Semitic l is written as Egyptian r, because Egyptian hieroglyphic and hieratic writing had no specific sign for l.

Most of the words appear to be non-Egyptian, which Haring takes as a sign of a Semitic tradition adapted to Egyptian script. They do not correspond to the letter names known from the Hebrew tradition, and Haring suggests that the halaḥam may have had its own letter names. Several of the signs accompanying the words, however, match the Proto-Sinaitic characters for h, l and m. Hans-Werner Fischer-Elfert and Manfred Krebernik favour a wholly Semitic identification of the vocabulary.

In 2018 Thomas Schneider proposed new etymologies for the words and suggested that the acrostic on the obverse may form a mnemonic verse. He also argued that the reverse may preserve the beginning of the abgad order, which would make the ostracon a double abecedary. Haring regards that reading of the reverse as attractive but uncertain. Given the apparent absence of the order in Egypt in the centuries immediately before and after, he considers it unclear whether the ostracon reflects an Egyptian tradition or a scribe's incidental contact with a foreign one.

=== Byblos syllabary ===
Hugo Cartwright, a software engineer used the results of his 2026 study into alphabetical orders as a basis for adding the HLḤM as one of his proposed additional decipherment constraints. This led to better identification of the base consonants of the Byblos syllabary. His decipherment attempt also unwillingly resulted in an abugida principle. Independently of the Byblos script, his study also found rank correlation between the Maghrebian abjadi order and a HLḤM abecedary called Tay19 suggesting a link between the ʾbg and hlḥm may exist.

== See also ==
- Abecedarium
- Abjad numerals
- Alphabetical order
- History of the alphabet
- Ugaritic alphabet
