= Bebi (vizier) =

Egyptian vizier under king Mentuhotep II in the Eleventh Dynasty

- Vizier of Egypt
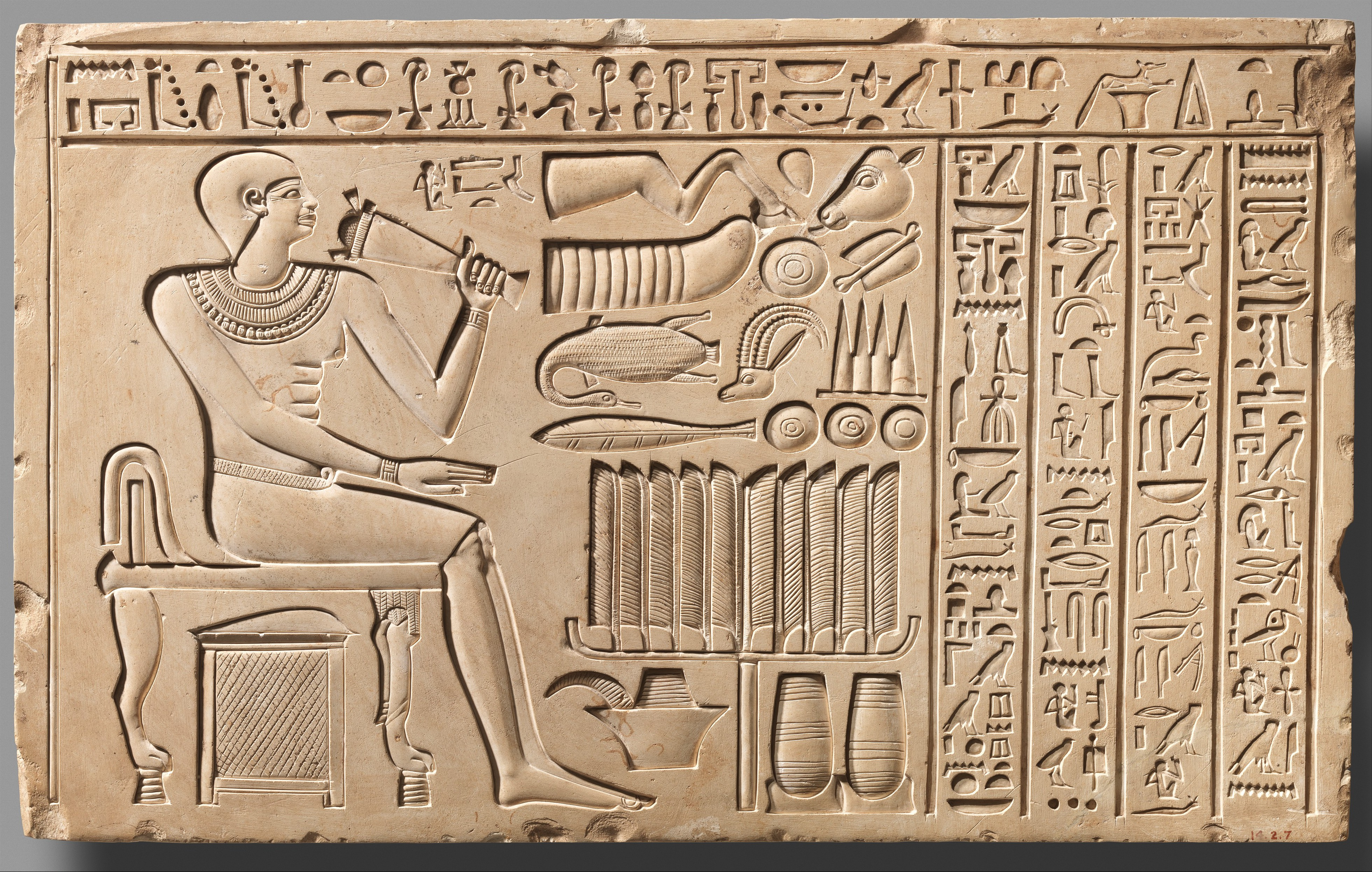
- Stela mentioning a treasurer Bebi, likely Bebi in his early career.
Egyptian name
b b i
- Tenure: c. 2025 BC
- Successor: Dagi
- Dynasty: 11th Dynasty
- Pharaoh: Mentuhotep II

Bebi was an ancient Egyptian vizier under king Mentuhotep II in the Eleventh Dynasty.

He is known with certainty only from a relief fragment found in the mortuary temple of the king at Deir el-Bahari. The fragment is now in the British Museum. The short caption to the figure of Bebi reads: vizier, zab-official, the one belonging to the curtain Bebi. Bebi might have been the first Middle Kingdom official with that title. His successor was Dagi. Perhaps Bebi started his career as treasurer: indeed, a treasurer with the name Bebi is known from the stela of a minor official called Maati, now in the Metropolitan Museum of Art, New York (acc. no. 14.2.7).

== Literature ==
- J.P. Allen: The high officials of the early Middle Kingdom, In: n. Strudwick/J. H. Taylor (editors): The Theban Necropolis, London 2003, p. 22
