= Mentuhotep (treasurer) =

Egyptian official and treasurer

- Treasurer of Egypt
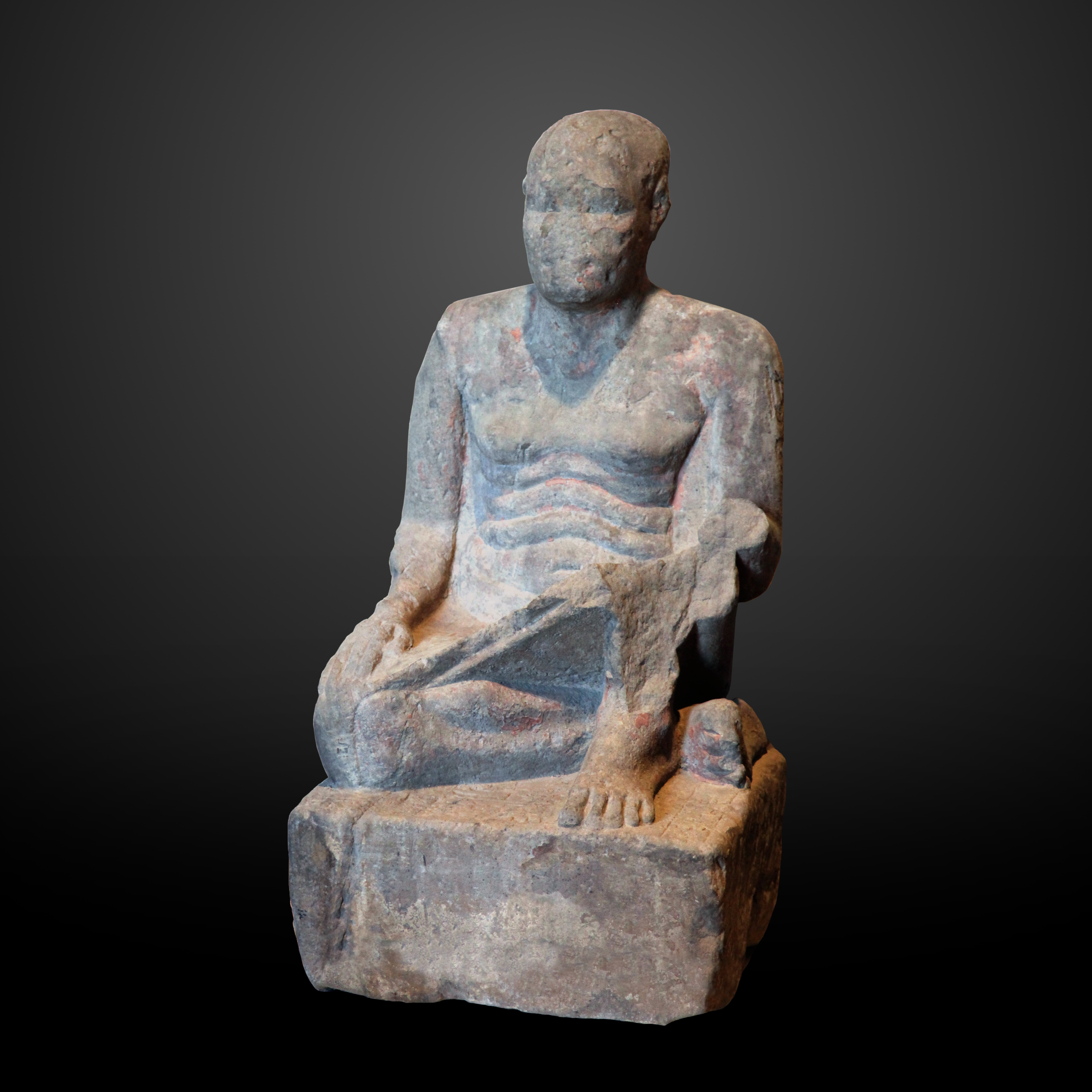
- Statue of Mentuhotep
- Pharaoh: Senusret I

Mentuhotep was an ancient Egyptian official and treasurer under the 12th Dynasty king Senusret I. Mentuhotep is one of the best attested officials of the Middle Kingdom period. There is a series of statues found at Karnak, showing him as a scribe. On these he has been given the title of overseer of all royal works, which would suggest that he was involved in overseeing the construction of the temple at Karnak. At el-Lisht he had a large tomb next to the pyramid of Senusret I. When it was found it was badly damaged, but there are remains of high quality reliefs and fragments of statues. The burial chamber still contained two sarcophagi, one smashed and the other one well preserved, made of granite and with brightly painted interiors.

In Abydos, a large stele is erected in Mentuhotep's name. It is inscribed with a number of official titles, including those of vizier. The vizier's title does not appear in the tomb of Mentuhotep. Therefore, there is some discussion as to whether he was actually a vizier or whether it was an honorific title.

In year 22 of Senusret I a certain Sobekhotep is attested as treasurer. Mentuhotep must have been his successor. It is unknown whether he was still in office under Amenemhet II.

== Literature ==
- Dieter Arnold: Middle Kingdom Tomb Architecture at Lisht. New York 2008, S. 38–50, Tafeln 62–92, ISBN 978-1-58839-194-0
- William Kelly Simpson: Rulers and Administrators - Dynasty 12, The Rule of the House of Itj-towy with Some Personal Reminiscences, In: D. P. Silverman, W. K. Simpson, J. Wegner (Hrsg.): Archaism and Innovation: Studies in the Culture of Middle Kingdom Egypt, New Haven, Philadelphia 2009 S. 297-300 ISBN 978-0-9802065-1-7
