= Senankh =

Senankh was an ancient Egyptian treasurer during the Twelfth Dynasty, under king Senusret III. Senankh is so far only known from a rock inscription carved on the Sehel Island, south of Aswan. Senankh bears the titles royal sealer, sole friend and leader of works in the whole land. His main title is treasurer. The inscription is dated in the 8th year of Senusret III and reports the digging or clearing of a canal with the name beautiful are the ways of Khakaure. Khakaure is the throne name of Senusret III.

== Literature ==
- Wolfram Grajetzki: Court Officials of the Egyptian Middle Kingdom, London 2009 p. 57-58, fig. 23 ISBN 978-0-7156-3745-6
