= Sobekhotep (Middle Kingdom treasurer) =

Egyptian treasurer

- Treasurer of Egypt
- Tenure: c. 1950 BC
- Pharaoh: Senusret I

Sobekhotep (fl. c. 1950 BC) was an ancient Egyptian treasurer in office under king Senusret I. The treasurer was one of the leading officials at the royal court, responsible for supplying the palace with all kinds of goods. Sobekhotep is only attested in a rock inscription in Hatnub in Middle Egypt where alabaster was quarried. The inscription dates to year 22 of the reign of Senusret I. Next to title treasurer, Sobekhotep bears the titles royal sealer and sole friend. His successor in office might have been Mentuhotep.
