= Herfu =

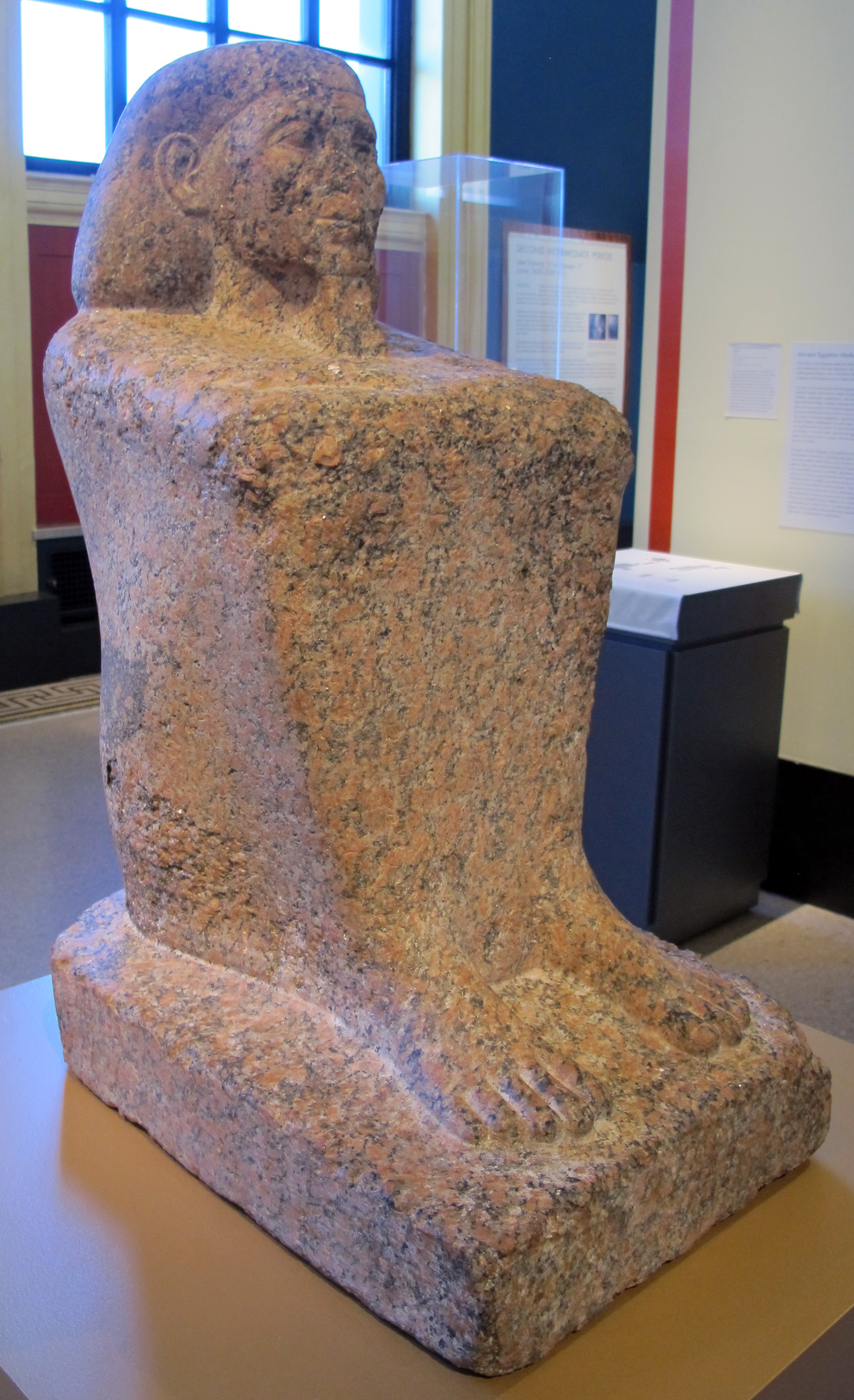
Blockstatue perhaps belonging to Herfu

Herfu was an Ancient Egyptian treasurer in the Thirteenth Dynasty. As treasurer (imi-r xtmt) he was one of the highest officials at the royal court. Herfu is known from a number of objects, although very little is actually known about his life. The highest number of objects belonging to him are several scarab seals. On one of these he is high steward (imi-r pr wr), making it possible to reconstruct a career from a high steward to a treasurer. In the Petrie Museum of Egyptian Archaeology (UC 16366) there is a weight with his name and titles. On a statue now in the Brooklyn Museum, his name is only partly preserved.
