= Alphabet effect =

Hypotheses in communication theory

The alphabet effect is a group of hypotheses in communication theory arguing that phonetic writing, and alphabetic scripts in particular, have served to promote and encourage the cognitive skills of abstraction, analysis, coding, decoding, and classification. Promoters of these hypotheses are associated with the Toronto School of Communication, such as Marshall McLuhan, Harold Innis, Walter Ong, Vilém Flusser and more recently Robert K. Logan; the term "alphabet effect" comes from Logan's 1986 work (see the bibliography below which references the 2004 second edition).

== Overview ==
The theory claims that a greater level of abstraction is required due to the greater economy of symbols in alphabetic systems; and this abstraction and the analytic skills needed to interpret phonemic symbols in turn has contributed to the cognitive development of its users. Proponents of this theory hold that the development of phonetic writing and the alphabet in particular (as distinct from other types of writing systems) has made a significant impact on Western thinking and development precisely because it introduced a new level of abstraction, analysis, coding, decoding and classification. McLuhan and Logan (1977) while not suggesting a direct causal connection nevertheless suggest that, as a result of these skills, the use of the alphabet created an environment conducive to the development of codified law, monotheism, abstract science, deductive logic, objective history, and individualism. According to Logan, "All of these innovations, including the alphabet, arose within the very narrow geographic zone between the Tigris-Euphrates river system and the Aegean Sea, and within the very narrow time frame between 2000 B.C. and 500 B.C." (Logan 2004). The emergence of codified law in Sumer as exemplified by the Hammurabic code actually coincided with the reform of the Akkadian syllabic system and is not directly influenced by the alphabet per se but rather by a phonetic writing system consisting of only sixty signs. Also it has to be pointed out that there was a robust scientific tradition in China but that science as practised in ancient China was not abstract but concrete and practical. In fact the impetus for formulating the alphabet effect was to explain why abstract science began in the West and not China despite the long list of inventions and technology that first appeared in China as documented by Joseph Needham in his book The Grand Titration (Needham 1969). The alphabet effect provides an alternative explanation to what is known as Needham's Grand Question, namely why China had been overshot by the West in science and technology, despite its earlier successes.

Another impact of alphabetic writing was that it led to the invention of zero, the place number system, negative numbers, and algebra by Hindu and Buddhist mathematicians in India 2000 years ago (Logan 2004). These ideas were picked up by Arab mathematicians and scientists and eventually made their way to Europe 1400 years later.

Prior to the written word there was a monopoly of knowledge by priests. (Innes: 1991, p. 4) This was because literacy was seen to be very time-consuming. Therefore, all literacy was left in the hands of priests. With the priests monopolizing the content of religious texts there would be little or no dissention among the public. Thus the introduction of the alphabet substantially limited the power of the priests and religious texts were now open to society for questioning.

A social ramification of the introduction of the alphabet was the creation of social distinctions within society. Scholar Andrew Robinson supports this point by stating that those who are illiterate within society are seen as being deficient and "backward" (Robinson: 1995, p. 215). Consequently, the development of the alphabet allowed for distinctions to be formed within society between the literate upper class and the illiterate lower class.

The development of the alphabet and hence the written word has also affected the impact of emotion. This point is also shared by Marshall McLuhan who believes that to translate a beautiful picture into words would be to deprive it of correctly articulating its best qualities (McLuhan: 1964, p. 83). Therefore, the written word has deprived both images and beautiful objects of the correct level of emotion with which to express their exact appearance.

The fact that the alphabet introduced the idea that a person's writing could live on long after they died was another social ramification of the alphabet. This argument is also shared by Andrew Robinson. Robinson believes that the need for "immortality" has always been of extreme importance for many authors. (Robinson: 2006, p. 83) As a result, the development of the written word allowed for the "immortality" of authors and their written works.

== Criticism of the theory as ethnocentric ==
Grosswiler (2004) notes that many scholars (including former adherents of the theory such as Goody) have pointed out that the theory is based on a particular Hellenocentric account of science, which neglects how different cultures have had hegemony scientifically irrespective of their writing systems.

== Criticism of the theory's account of Chinese writing ==
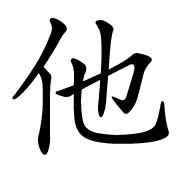
The character 他 (equivalent to English he/she/it). In Old Chinese it was pronounced /*l̥ʰaːl/; it is composed of the 亻 radical ("person") and the character 也, which in Old Chinese was pronounced /*laːlʔ/.

Several scholars have pointed out that the logographic account of Chinese writing is obsolete and incorrect. John DeFrancis suggests the use of the term semasiographic rather than logographic, because the idea of Chinese characters as pictorial in nature is only partially true. From Dominic Yu's account:

Take, for example, the character 他, representing the third person singular pronoun "tā". The left hand component, the "person" radical, indicates that this character vaguely has something to do with a person or people. I say "vaguely" because this is a very common radical is also used in characters such as 份, 假, and 做, meaning, "portion," "fake," and "to do," respectively. The right side is a phonetic component indicating that (at some earlier stage of Chinese), this character rhymed with 也, now pronounced "yě." Nothing in this character indicates the idea of "third person singular pronoun." From this example, we can see that Chinese characters mainly represent sounds, and only represent ideas in a rather insignificant way. Thus, Logan's claim that Chinese characters represent the "idea of a word" is baseless.

== Criticism of the theory from alternate paths to alphabetic script ==
It has been suggested (by e.g. Grosswiler 2004) that Schmandt-Besserat's research into the origin of writing from three-dimensional tokens gives an alternative to the progressivist account of the Alphabet Effect theory. Grosswiler suggests that it is the potential for recording memory, not any one system of it, that propels a culture towards scientific thought.

== See also ==
- Acrophony
- Bicameral mentality
- History of the alphabet
- Lateralization of brain function
- Left-brain interpreter
- Sapir-Whorf hypothesis

== Bibliography ==
- Crowley, D.; Heyer, P. (2006). Communication in History. Allyn and Bacon Inc.
- DeFrancis, John (1984). Chinese Language: Fact and Fantasy. University of Hawaii Press.
- DeFrancis, John (1989). Visible Speech: The Diverse Oneness of Writing Systems. University of Hawaii Press.
- Grosswiler, Paul (2004). "Dispelling the Alphabet Effect". Canadian Journal of Communication, Vol 29, No 2 (2004).
- Hoffman, Joel M. (2004). In the Beginning: A Short History of the Hebrew Language. NYU Press. ISBN 0-8147-3654-8. — (Chapter 3 traces and summarizes the invention of alphabetic writing).
- Innis, H.; Heyer, P.; Crowley, D. (1991). The Bias of Communication. University of Toronto Press.
- Logan, Robert K. (2004). The Alphabet Effect: A Media Ecology Understanding of the Making of Western Civilization. Hampton Press. ISBN 1-57273-523-6.
- McLuhan, M (1964). Understanding Media: The Extensions of Man. Latimer Trend & Co. Ltd, Great Britain.
- McLuhan, Marshall; Logan, Robert K. (1977). Alphabet, Mother of Invention. Etcetera. Vol. 34, pp. 373–383.
- Needham, Joseph (1969). The Grand Titration: Science and Society in East and West. George Allen & Unwin Ltd, London. ISBN 0-04-931005-4.
- Ouaknin, Marc-Alain; Bacon, Josephine (1999). Mysteries of the Alphabet: The Origins of Writing. Abbeville Press. ISBN 0-7892-0521-1.
- Robinson, A (1995). The Story of Writing. Thames and Hudson Ltd, London.
- Sacks, David (2004). Letter Perfect: The Marvelous History of Our Alphabet from A to Z. Broadway Books. ISBN 0-7679-1173-3.
- Yu, Dominic. "Thoughts on Logan's The Alphabet Effect". Archived from the original on 2016-04-13.
