= Dagi =

Egyptian vizier

- Vizier of Egypt
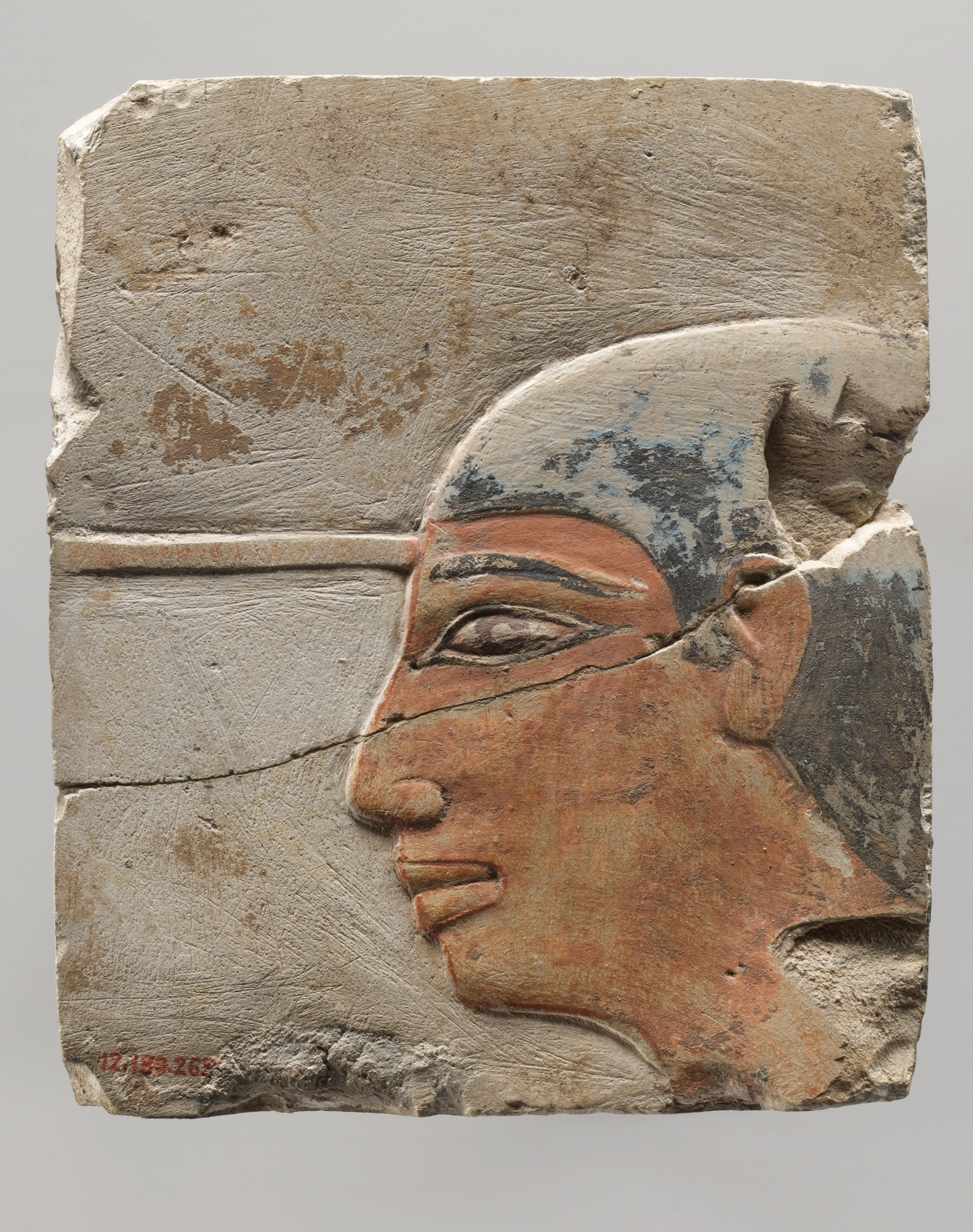
- Painted relief fragment from his tomb TT103, now at the Metropolitan Museum of Art, New York
- Tenure: c. 2025 BC
- Predecessor: Bebi
- Pharaoh: Mentuhotep II

Dagi (fl. c. 2025 BC) was an ancient Egyptian vizier during the reign of pharaoh Mentuhotep II of the Eleventh Dynasty.

Dagi is mainly known from his tomb in Western Thebes (TT103), which was once decorated with paintings and reliefs. From the reliefs only small fragments were found while there are some substantial remains of the paintings. In the tomb decoration he appears with the titles of a vizier. In the tomb was also found his decorated sarcophagus (now in the Cairo Egyptian Museum) on which he appears with the title overseer of the gateway. This was his office most likely before he became vizier. His name and these titles also appear on reliefs found in the mortuary temple of Mentuhotep II at Deir el-Bahari. These fragments provide the evidence that he was in office under this king.

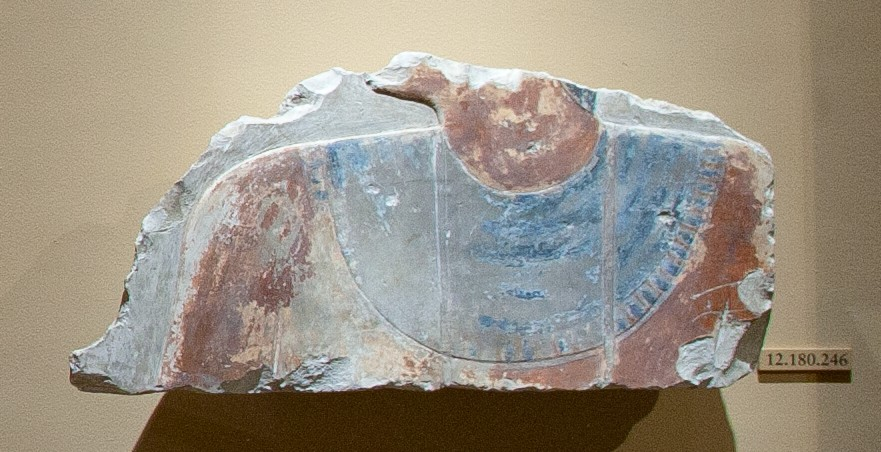
Relief Dagi Met

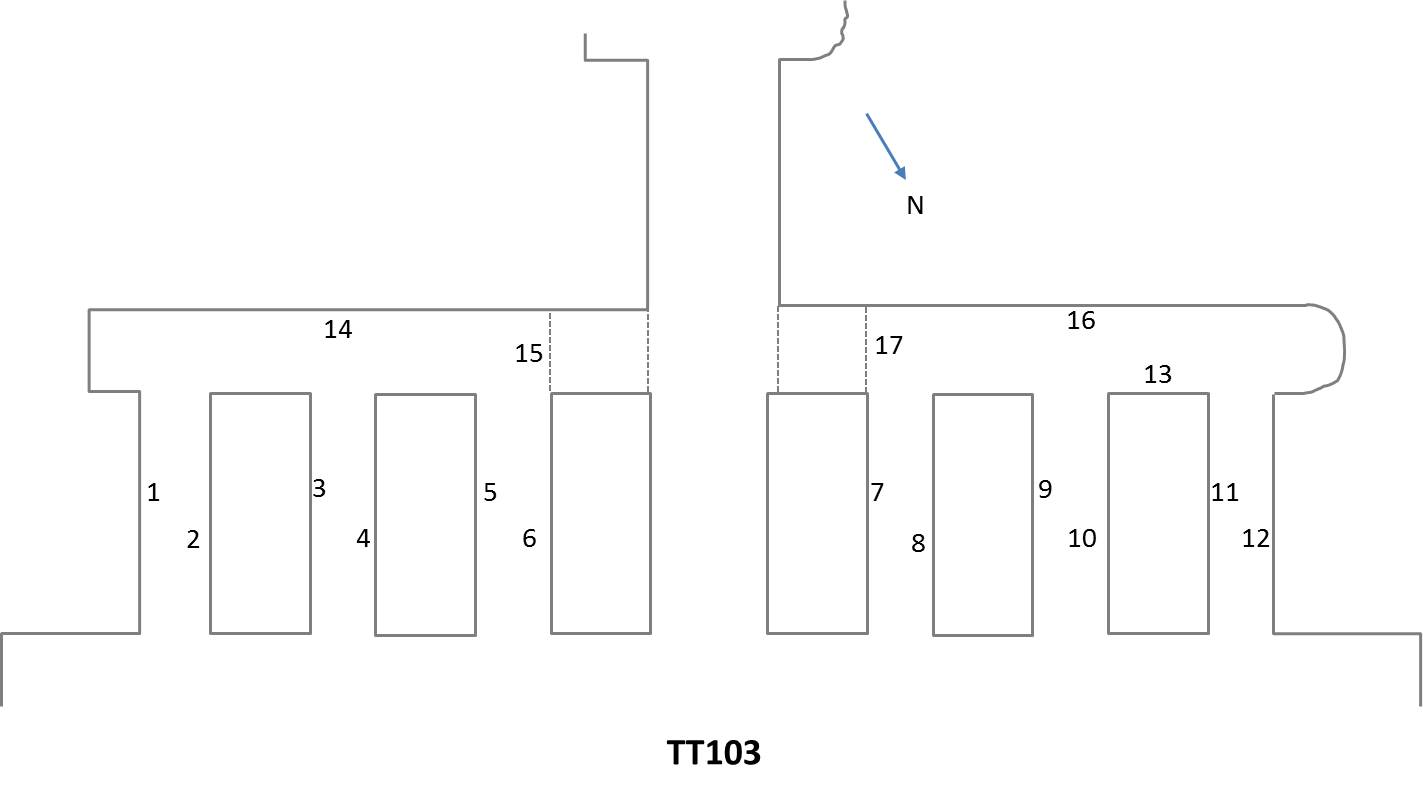
Plan of Dagi's tomb, TT103

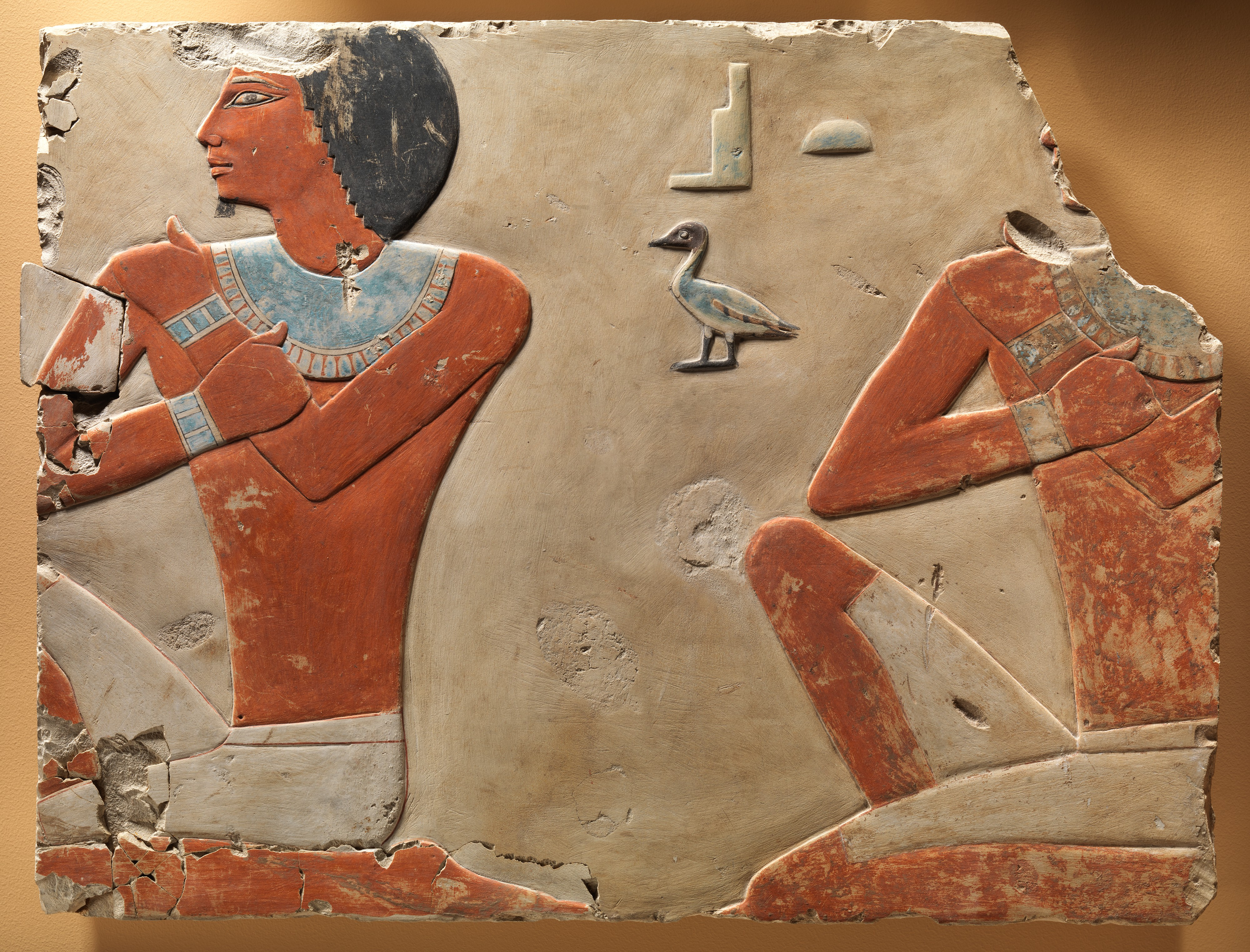
Relief fragment from T103 depicting two officials or sons of Dagi in a kneeling position

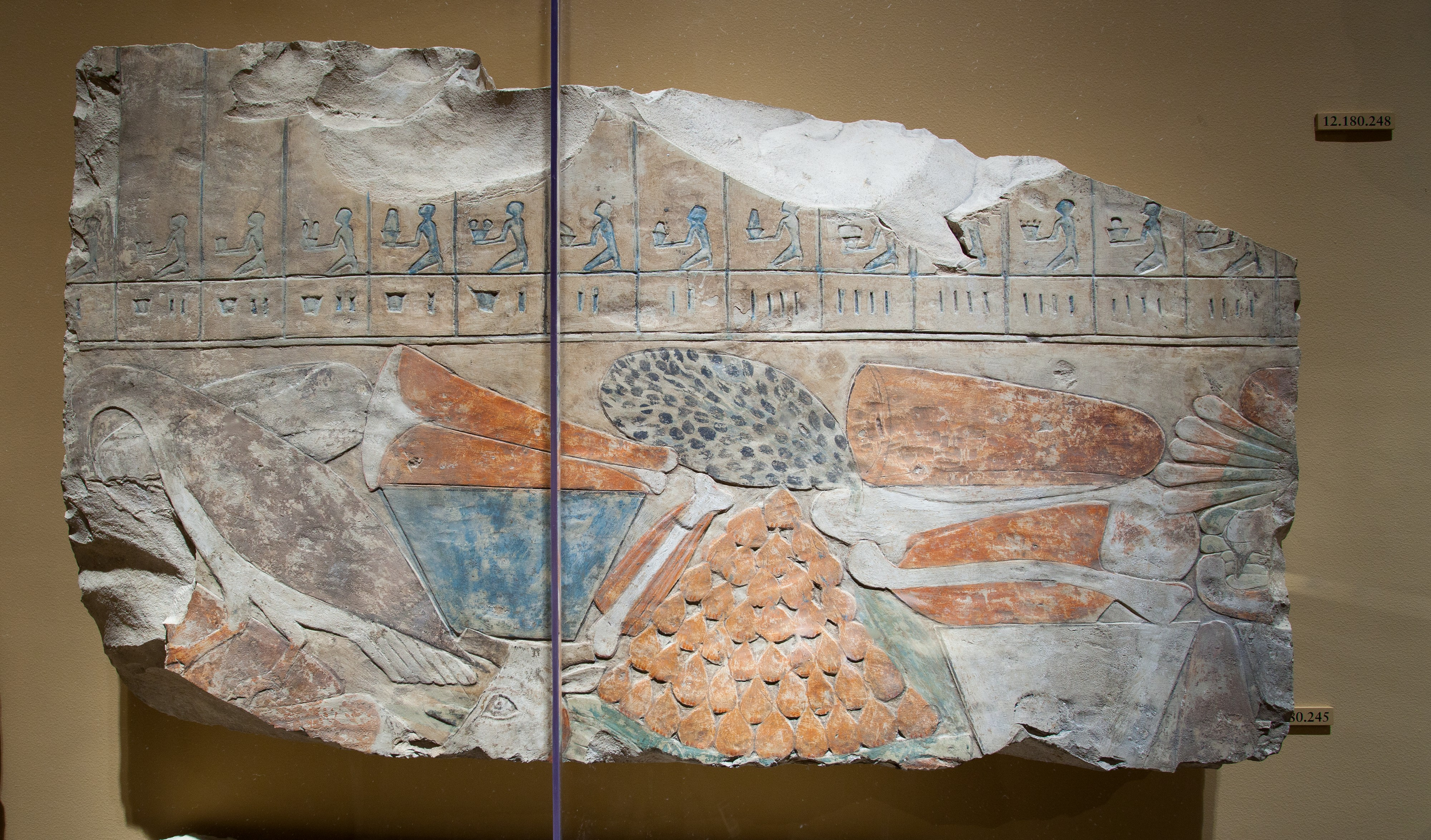
Relief fragment from TT103 depicting a pile of offerings and part of an offering list

== Literature ==
- Allen, James P. (2003), The high officials of the early Middle Kingdom. In: N. Strudwick, J. Taylor (Hrsg.): The Theban Necropolis. London, p. 22 ISBN 0-7141-2247-5
- Grajetzki, Wolfram (2009), Court Officials of the Egyptian Middle Kingdom, London, p. 26 ISBN 978-0-7156-3745-6
- Martín García de la Cruz, Andrés (2020), "Estudio diacrónico de la tumba del visir Dagi (TT 103)" (PDF), BAEDE (in Spanish), no. 29, pp. 49–76, ISSN 1131-6780
