= Acrophony =

Phenomenon of naming letters in an alphabet

Acrophony (/əˈkrɒfəni/; Ancient Greek: ἄκρος, romanized: akros, lit. 'uppermost' + φωνή phone 'sound') is the naming of letters of an alphabetic writing system so that a letter's name begins with the letter itself. For example, Greek letter names are acrophonic: the names of the letters α, β, γ, δ, are spelled with the respective letters: άλφα (alpha), βήτα (beta), γάμμα (gamma), δέλτα (delta).

The paradigm for acrophonic alphabets is the Proto-Sinaitic script and the succeeding Phoenician alphabet, in which the letter A, representing the sound [ʔ], is thought to have derived from an Egyptian hieroglyph representing an ox, and is called 'ox', ʾalp, which starts with the glottal stop sound the letter represents. The second letter of the Phoenician alphabet is bet (which means 'house' and looks a bit like a shelter) representing the sound [b], and from ālep-bēt came the word "alphabet" – another case where the beginning of a thing gives the name to the whole, which was in fact common practice in the ancient Near East.

Semitic abjad letter bet
Hieroglyph	Proto-Sinaitic	Phoenician	Paleo-Hebrew
O1		Bet	

The Glagolitic and early Cyrillic alphabets, although not consisting of ideograms, also have letters named acrophonically. The letters representing /a, b, v, g, d, e/ are named az, buky, vedi, glagol, dobro, est. Naming the letters in order, one recites a poem, a mnemonic which helps students and scholars learn the alphabet: Az buky vedi, glagol’ dobro est’ means 'I know letters, [the] word is good' in Old Church Slavonic.

In Irish and Ogham, letters were formerly named after trees, for example A was ailm ('white fir'), B was beith ('birch') and C was coll ('hazel'). The rune alphabets used by the Germanic peoples were also named acrophonically; for example, the first three letters, which represented the sounds /f, u, θ/, were named fé, ur, þurs in Norse ('wealth', 'slag/rain', 'giant') and feoh, ur, þorn in Old English ('wealth', 'ox', 'thorn'). Both sets of names probably stemmed from Proto-Germanic *fehu, *uruz, *thurisaz.

The Thai alphabet is learned acrophonically, each letter being represented pictorially in school-books (ก ไก่ ko kai 'chicken'; ข ไข่ kho khai 'egg', ค ควาย kho khwai 'buffalo'; ฆ ระฆัง kho rakhang 'bell'; ง งู ngo ngu 'snake', etc.).

Rudyard Kipling gives a fictional description of the process in one of his Just So Stories, "How the Alphabet was Made".

Modern radiotelephony and aviation use spelling alphabets in which the letters of the English alphabet are arbitrarily assigned words and names in an acrophonic manner to avoid misunderstanding. The best-known of these is the NATO phonetic alphabet, which begins with Alfa, Bravo, Charlie, Delta.

Most notes of the solfege scale – namely re, mi, fa, sol, and la – derive their names from the first syllable of the lines of Ut queant laxis, a Latin hymn.

== See also ==
- Alphabet effect
- History of the alphabet
- Logogram
