= Tay (treasurer) =

Tay was a high official of Ancient Egypt with the main title treasurer. He was in office under Hatshepsut (about 1508–1458 BC) and in the first years of Thutmose III (about 1479 BC to 1425 BC). Tay is only known from a few attestations. He appears in a rock inscription on the island of Sehel, in a letter (P.Louvre 3230(b)) that is dated by context under Hatshepsut and from a stela found on Sinai. The latter inscription is dated to year 25 under king Thutmose III. Tay is shown here standing behind the king. According to the rock inscription on Sehel he was on a military campaign with the queen to Nubia. The inscription also provides the throne name Maatkare, of queen Hatshepsut The exact date of the military enterprise is not known for sure, but may have happened in year 12 of the queen. Tay was therefore in office from about year 12 of Hatshepsut till about year 25 under Thutmose III. Under Hatshepsut there is also attested the treasurer Nehsi. Recently it has been suggested, that the office of the royal treasurer was divided into a northern and into a southern office. According to that, Nehesi was the northern treasurer under Hatshepsut, Tay the southern treasurer. His burial place was identified in 2021 at Wadi 300 at Western Thebes (about 300 west of the Valley of the Queens). It is an undecorated chamber, that still contained a canopic jar with the name and title of Tay
