= Treasurer (Ancient Egypt) =

m r xtm t
Overseer of the Seal
Overseer of Sealed Things
in hieroglyphs

The Treasurer (or often also translated as Chancellor) in Ancient Egypt is the modern translation of the title imi-r ḫtmt (word by word: Overseer of the Seal or Overseer of sealed things). The office is known since the end of the Old Kingdom, where people with this title appear sporadically in the organization of private estates.

In the Middle Kingdom, the office became one of the most important ones at the royal court. At the end of the 18th Dynasty, the title lost its importance, although the famous Bay had this office. In the later New Kingdom the function of a treasurer was overtaken by the overseer of the treasury.

The treasurer was responsible for products coming to the royal palace. They were the main economic administrator of the royal belongings.

== Middle Kingdom title holders ==
- Tjetjy in office under Intef II and Intef III
- Bebi, was later appointed vizier, under Mentuhotep II
- Kheti, under Mentuhotep II
- Meketre, under Mentuhotep II and after
- Ipi, under Amenemhet I
- Rehuerdjersen, under Amenemhet I or later
- Sobekhotep, under Senusret I, year 22
- Mentuhotep, under Senusret I
- Merykau, under Amenemhat II
- Siese, was later appointed vizier, under Amenemhat II
- Senankh, under Senusret III
- Sobekemhat under Senusret III
- Iykhernofret, under Senusret III
- Senusretankh, under Amenemhat III
- Senebsumai, Thirteenth Dynasty
- Herfu, Thirteenth Dynasty
- Senebi, Thirteenth Dynasty
- Amenhotep, Thirteenth Dynasty

== New Kingdom title holders ==
- Neferperet, under Ahmose I
- Ahmose Pen-Nekhebet, under Ahmose I to Hatshepsut
- Nehsi, under Hatshepsut
- Tay, under Hatshepsut
- Sennefer, under Thutmose III
- Min, under Thutmose III
- Sobekhotep, under Thutmose IV
- Meryre, under Amenhotep III
- Ptahmose, under Amenhotep III, after year 30
- Bay, under Seti II

== Literature ==
- Stephen Quirke: Titles and bureaux of Egypt 1850-1700 BC, London 2004 p. 48-49 ISBN 0-9547218-0-2
