= Nehsi =

Egyptian court official

Nehsi was an official at the court of the ancient Egyptian pharaoh Hatshepsut. He appears to have been of Nubian descent–nehsi (nHs.j) meaning He of Nubia–and held a number of important official positions, such as Wearer of the Royal Seal and chief treasurer. He is depicted in the "Punt Reliefs" in the temple of Deir el-Bahri where he is described as having been responsible for dispatching Hatshepsut's expedition to Punt. This has been interpreted by some as his having led the expedition from beginning to end.

The expeditionary force comprised five ships, each seventy feet long, accommodating 210 men including sailors and 30 rowers. Among the company were people who made records of the fauna, flora and the inhabitants of Punt, spiritual forebears of the Napoleonic scientists who wrote their Déscriptions of Egypt. Nehsi was buried in Saqqara, where he had a rock cut tomb.

== See also ==
- List of explorers
