= Amenhotep (18th dynasty High Priest of Amun) =

High Priest in the Temple of Amun

Amenhotep lived during the 18th Dynasty, the New Kingdom era; (c. 1479 – 1425 BC). He was the High Priest in the Temple of Amun.

He was in charge of most of the wealth of Egypt, which flowed in and out of the Temple of Amun. He was also in charge of the gardens and granaries of the Temple. During his lifetime he presided over the funerals of three Pharaohs: Amenhotep I, Thutmose I, and Thutmose III.

Amenhotep was buried in Tomb C.3.
