= Orly Goldwasser =

Israeli Egyptologist

Orly Goldwasser (Hebrew: אורלי גולדווסר) is an Israeli Egyptologist, professor of Egyptology at the Hebrew University of Jerusalem.

Orly Goldwasser was born in Tel Aviv in 1951, received her B.A. at Tel Aviv University, and continued studying at the Hebrew University in Jerusalem where she was awarded her M.A. and PhD degrees. She occupies the chair of Egyptology at the Hebrew University and is an Honorary Professor at the University of Göttingen. She was guest professor at the University of Göttingen, Harvard University and at the Collège de France.

Her main interests are the semiotics of the hieroglyphic script, intercultural relations: Egypt and the Levant, metaphors and literary images in ancient Egyptian literature and the origin of the alphabet. She is the discoverer of the classification system in the hieroglyphic script.

== Selected publications ==
- From Icon to Metaphor, Studies in the Semiotics of the Hieroglyphs, OBO 142, Fribourg & Göttingen 1995;
- Prophets, Lovers and Giraffes: Wor(l)d Classification in Ancient Egypt, Göttinger Orientforschungen IV. Reihe Ägypten 38, Wiesbaden 2002;
- Canaanites Reading Hieroglyphs. Horus is Hathor? - The Invention of the Alphabet in Sinai, Egypt and the Levant 16, pp. 121–160, 2006;
- How the Alphabet Was Born from Hieroglyphs, Biblical Archaeology Review 36, No. 2 (March/April), pp. 40–53, 2010;
