= TT99 =

Theban tomb

Coordinates: 25.7315°N 32.6072°E

Theban tomb TT99
- Burial site of Senneferi
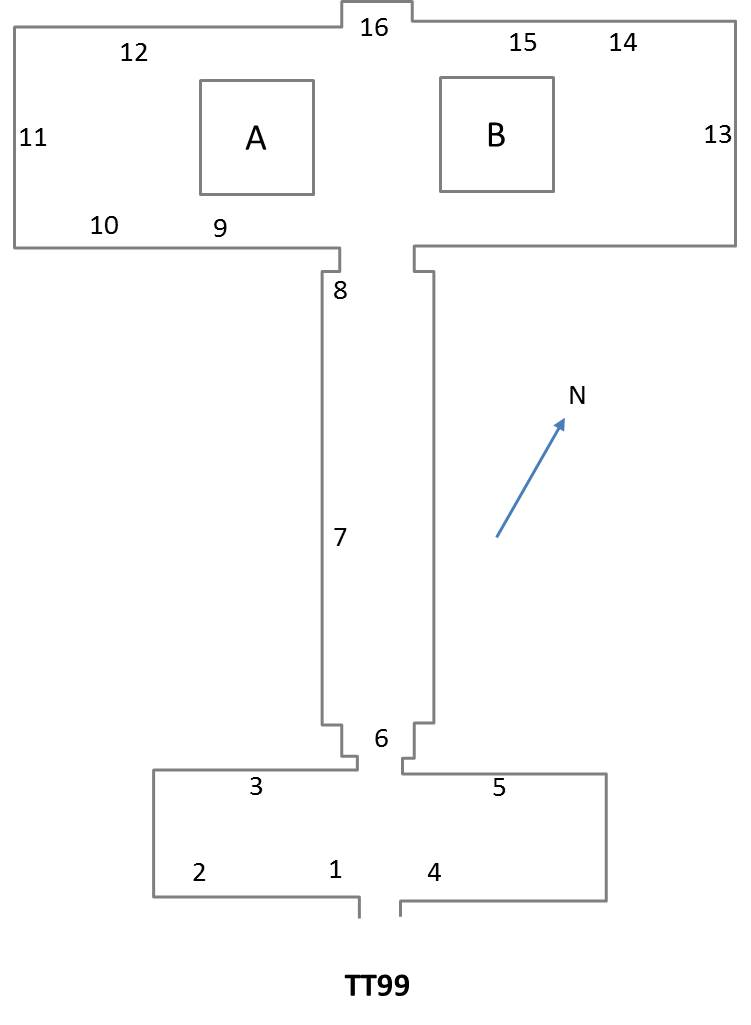

- Location within Egypt
- Location: Sheikh Abd el-Qurna, Theban Necropolis
- ← Previous; TT97 Next → TT100

The Theban Tomb TT99 is located in Sheikh Abd el-Qurna. It forms part of the Theban Necropolis, situated on the west bank of the Nile opposite Luxor. The sepulchre is the burial place of the ancient Egyptian noble, Senneferi. It has been worked on by an expedition from the University of Cambridge since 1992.

== HLHM Ostracon ==
The HLHM ostracon, or the Halaḥam inscription is a limestone shard, discovered during the excavation of tomb TT99 in Thebes, bearing lines of hieratic and hieroglyphic characters on two sides written in black ink. This inscription bears a lesser-known letter order of early Semitic script, known as "Halaham" (such an order is still found in the Ge'ez script), and is believed to date as old (circa fifteenth century BCE) as the tomb itself. These lettered inscriptions are the earliest predecessors to the modern Hebrew alphabet (Aleph, Bet, Gimel).

== See also ==
- List of Theban tombs
