= Meryre (treasurer) =

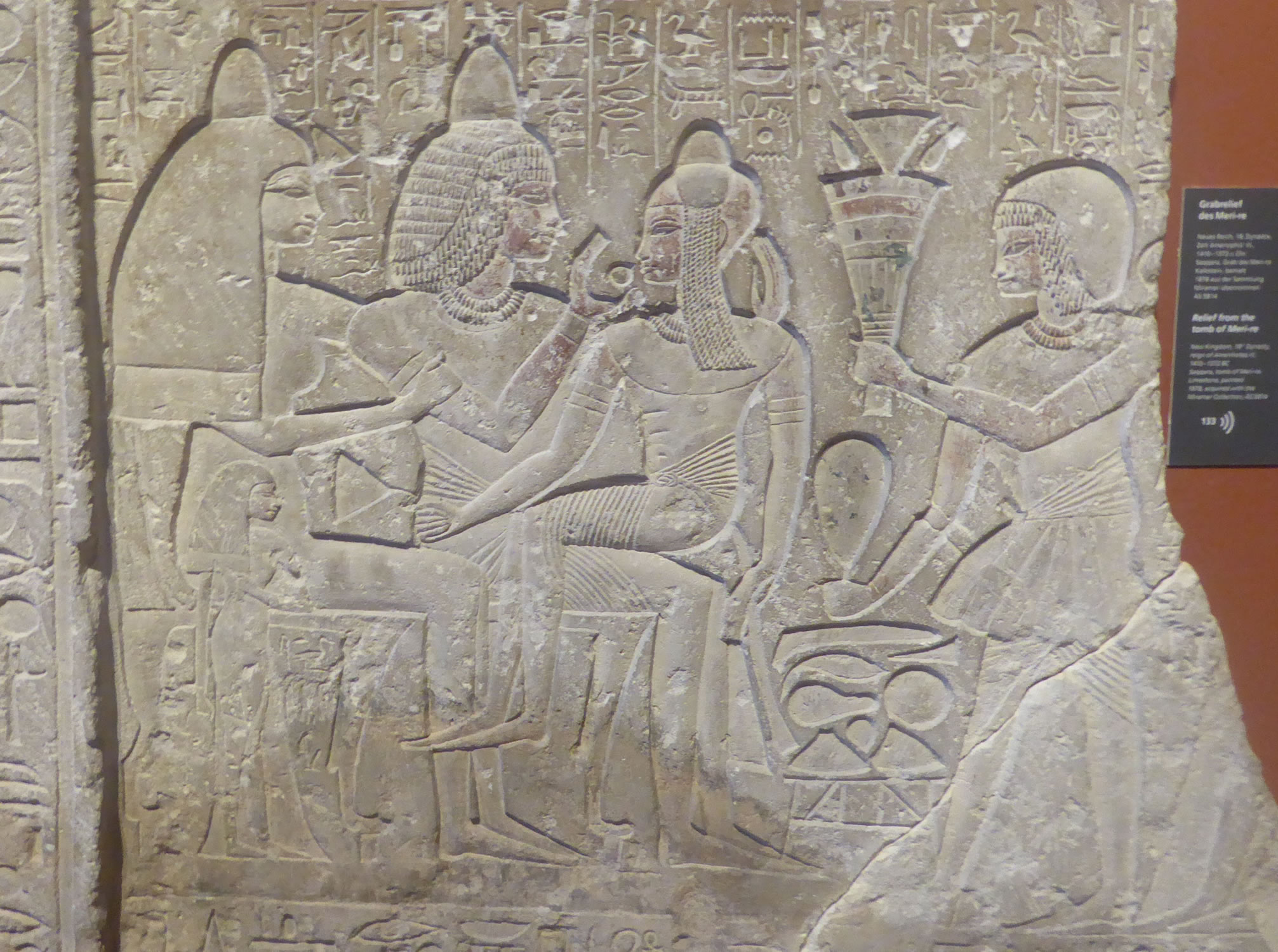
Relief from the tomb of Merire; Merire with prince Siatum on his laps

Meryre was an ancient Egyptian official under king Amenhotep III in the 18th Dynasty around 1375 BC. His main title was treasurer. He was therefore one of the most important officials at the royal court, looking after the belongings of the king and the goods of the palace. Meryre is so far only attested in his tomb at Saqqara, that was discovered in the 1980s in the temple area known as the Bubasteum. The tomb is decorated with reliefs. Some of them were already early on cut out of the walls and sold on the art market. Two of these reliefs are now in Vienna (Kunsthistorisches Museum). Old drawings show that they were once in a much better condition. One block depicts Meryre and his wife Baketamun in front of the underworld god Osiris and in a second register in front of Ra-Horachte. The other fragment shows Meryre and his wife in front of an offering table in the upper register. In the lower register he is shown together with the king's son Siatum, who is sitting on his lap. Meryre was evidently the tutor of this king's son. The father of Siatum is not mentioned and it was most likely Thutmose IV (the father of Amenhotep III under whom Meyre served).

In the tomb of Meryre no king's name is preserved. The tomb and Meryre are datable on stylistic grounds under king Amenhotep III, perhaps around year 30 of the king's reign.
