= History of the Hebrew alphabet =

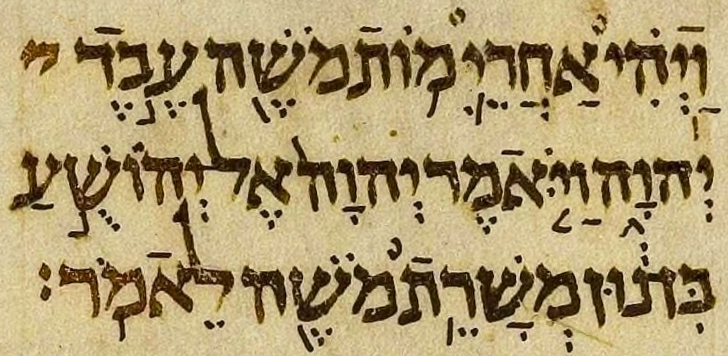
Aleppo Codex: 10th century Hebrew Bible with Masoretic pointing

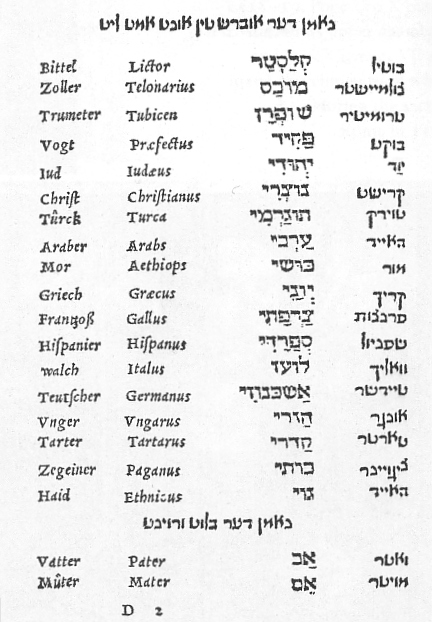
A page from a 16th-century Yiddish–Hebrew–Latin–German dictionary by Elijah Levita

The Hebrew alphabet is a script that was derived from the Aramaic alphabet during the Persian, Hellenistic and Roman periods (c. 500 BCE – 50 CE). It replaced the Paleo-Hebrew alphabet which was used in the earliest epigraphic records of the Hebrew language.

== History ==
Variations of the "square" Hebrew script by region and time

The history of the Hebrew alphabet is not to be confused with the history of the Paleo-Hebrew alphabet, so called not because it is ancestral to the Hebrew alphabet but because it was used to write the earliest form of the Hebrew language.

"Paleo-Hebrew alphabet" is a term (coined by Solomon Birnbaum in 1954) used for the script otherwise known as the Phoenician alphabet when used to write Hebrew, or when found in the context of the ancient Israelite kingdoms. This script was used in the kingdoms of Israel and Judah as well as throughout Canaan more generally, during the 10th to 7th centuries BCE. By the 6th or 5th centuries, this script had diverged into numerous national variants, the most successful of these being the Aramaic script, which came to be widely adopted in the Persian empire.

Following the Babylonian exile, Jews gradually stopped using the Paleo-Hebrew script, and instead adopted a "square" form of the Aramaic alphabet. A similar "square Aramaic script" is still used for contemporary western dialects of Aramaic (Western Neo-Aramaic).

This "square" variant of Aramaic developed into the Hebrew alphabet proper during the Second Temple period, in a process that was not complete before the 1st century CE; for example, the letter samekh developed its closed or circular form only in the middle Hasmonean period, around 100 BCE, and this variant becomes the standard form in early Herodian hands, in the 1st century CE.

The Samaritan alphabet, on the other hand, remains a direct descendant of the Paleo-Hebrew script.

The Hebrew alphabet was later adapted in order to write down the languages of the Jewish diaspora (Karaim, Kivruli, Judæo-Arabic, Ladino, Yiddish, etc.), and was retained all the while in relatively unadapted form throughout the diaspora for Hebrew, which remained the language of Jewish law, scriptures and scholarship. The Hebrew alphabet was also retained as the alphabet used for writing down the Hebrew language during its rebirth as an everyday modern language starting in the 18th to 19th century.

== Talmudic views ==
In the Talmud, the Paleo-Hebrew script is known as the Libona'a, associated with the Samaritan community who continued to preserve the script, and the Hebrew script is known as the Ashurith, associated with Assyria.

The Talmudic sages did not share a uniform stance on the subject of the development of the Hebrew alphabet. Some claimed that Paleo-Hebrew was the original script used by the Israelites at the time of the Exodus. According to this tradition, the block script seen today in Hebrew Torah Scrolls, called the "Assyrian script" (Kthav Ashurith) in the Talmud, was the original Hebrew script carved into the Ten Commandments.

Others believed that Paleo-Hebrew merely served as a stopgap in a time when the ostensibly original script (the Hebrew alphabet) had been lost. According to both opinions, Ezra the Scribe (c. 500 BCE) introduced, or reintroduced the Assyrian script to be used as the primary alphabet for the Hebrew language. The arguments given for both opinions are rooted in Jewish scripture and/or tradition.

A third opinion in the Talmud states that the script never changed altogether. It would seem that the sage who expressed this opinion did not believe that Paleo-Hebrew ever existed, despite the strong arguments supporting it. His stance is rooted in a scriptural verse, which makes reference to the shape of the letter vav. The sage argues further that, given the commandment to copy a Torah scroll directly from another, the script could not conceivably have been modified at any point. This third opinion was accepted by some early Jewish scholars, and rejected by others, partially because it was permitted to write the Torah in Greek.

== Ancestral scripts and script variants ==
Letter		Name	Scripts												
Letter		Name	Hebrew				Ancestral					Related			
Letter		Name	Cursive	Rashi	Braille		Hieroglyphic base of Proto-Sinaitic (assumed)	Proto-Sinaitic (reconstructed)	Phoenician	Paleo-Hebrew	Aramaic	Greek	Latin	Cyrillic	Arabic
א		Alef			⠁ (braille pattern dots-1)		F1	Aleph	Aleph	Aleph		Αα	Aa	Аа	ا
ב		Bet, Vet			⠧ (braille pattern dots-1236)	⠃ (braille pattern dots-12)	O1		Beth	Bet		Ββ	Bb	Бб; Вв	ﺑ ﺏ
ג		Gimel			⠛ (braille pattern dots-1245)		T14	Gimel	Gimel	Gimel		Γγ	Cc; Gg	Гг	ﺟ ﺝ
ד		Dalet			⠙ (braille pattern dots-145)		O31	Dalet	Daleth	Daled		Δδ	Dd	Дд	دذ
ה		Hei			⠓ (braille pattern dots-125)		A28	Heh	He	Heh		Εε	Ee	Ее; Єє	ه هـ ـهـ ـه
ו		Vav			⠺ (braille pattern dots-2456)	⠬ (braille pattern dots-346)	O30	Vov	Waw	Vav		Υυ; Ϝϝ	FfUuVv; WwYy	Ѵѵ; Уу	ﻭ
ז		Zayin			⠵ (braille pattern dots-1356)		U7	Zayin	Zayin	Zayin		Ζζ	Zz	Зз	ﺯ
ח		Het			⠭ (braille pattern dots-1346)		O6	Khet	Heth	Khet		Ηη	Hh	Ии	ﺣﺡ or خ
ט		Tet			⠞ (braille pattern dots-2345)		F35	Tet	Teth	Tet		Θθ	–	Ѳѳ	ﻁ
י		Yud			⠚ (braille pattern dots-245)		D36	Yud	Yodh	Yud		Ιι	Jj; Ii	Јј; Іі	ﻳ ﻱ
כ	ך	Kaf, Khaf			⠡ (braille pattern dots-16)	⠅ (braille pattern dots-13)	D46	Khof	Kaph	Khof		Κκ	Kk	Кк	ﻛ ﻙ
ל		Lamed			⠇ (braille pattern dots-123)		S39	Lamed	Lamedh	Lamed		Λλ	Ll	Лл	ﻟ ﻝ
מ	ם	Mem			⠍ (braille pattern dots-134)		N35	Mem	Mem	Mem		Μμ	Mm	Мм	ﻣ ﻡ
נ	ן	Nun			⠝ (braille pattern dots-1345)		I10	Nun	Nun	Nun		Νν	Nn	Нн	ﻧ ﻥ
ס		Samech			⠎ (braille pattern dots-234)		K1	Samekh	Samekh	Samekh		Ξξ; Χχ	Ss or Xx	Ѯѯ; Хх	ص or س
ע		Ayin			⠫ (braille pattern dots-1246)		D4	Ayin	Ayin	Ayin		Οο	Oo	Оо	ﻋ ع غـ غ
פ	ף	Pei, Fei			⠋ (braille pattern dots-124)	⠏ (braille pattern dots-1234)	D21	Pey	Pe	Pey		Ππ	Pp	Пп	ﻓ ﻑ
צ	ץ	Tsadi			⠮ (braille pattern dots-2346)		V33	Tsadi	Sade	Tzadi	,	Ϻϻ	–	Цц; Чч	ﺻ ص ضـ ض
ק		Kuf			⠟ (braille pattern dots-12345)		V24	Quf	Qoph	Quf		Ϙϙ	Qq	Ҁҁ	ﻗ ﻕ
ר		Reish			⠗ (braille pattern dots-1235)		D1	Resh	Res	Resh		Ρρ	Rr	Рр	ﺭ
ש		Shin, Sin			⠩ (braille pattern dots-146)	⠱ (braille pattern dots-156)	F18		Sin	Shin		Σσς	Ss	Сс; Шш	سـ س شـ ش
ת		Tav			⠹ (braille pattern dots-1456)	⠳ (braille pattern dots-1256)	Z11	Tof	Taw	Tof		Ττ	Tt	Тт	ﺗ ﺕ ﺛ ﺙ

== Gallery ==
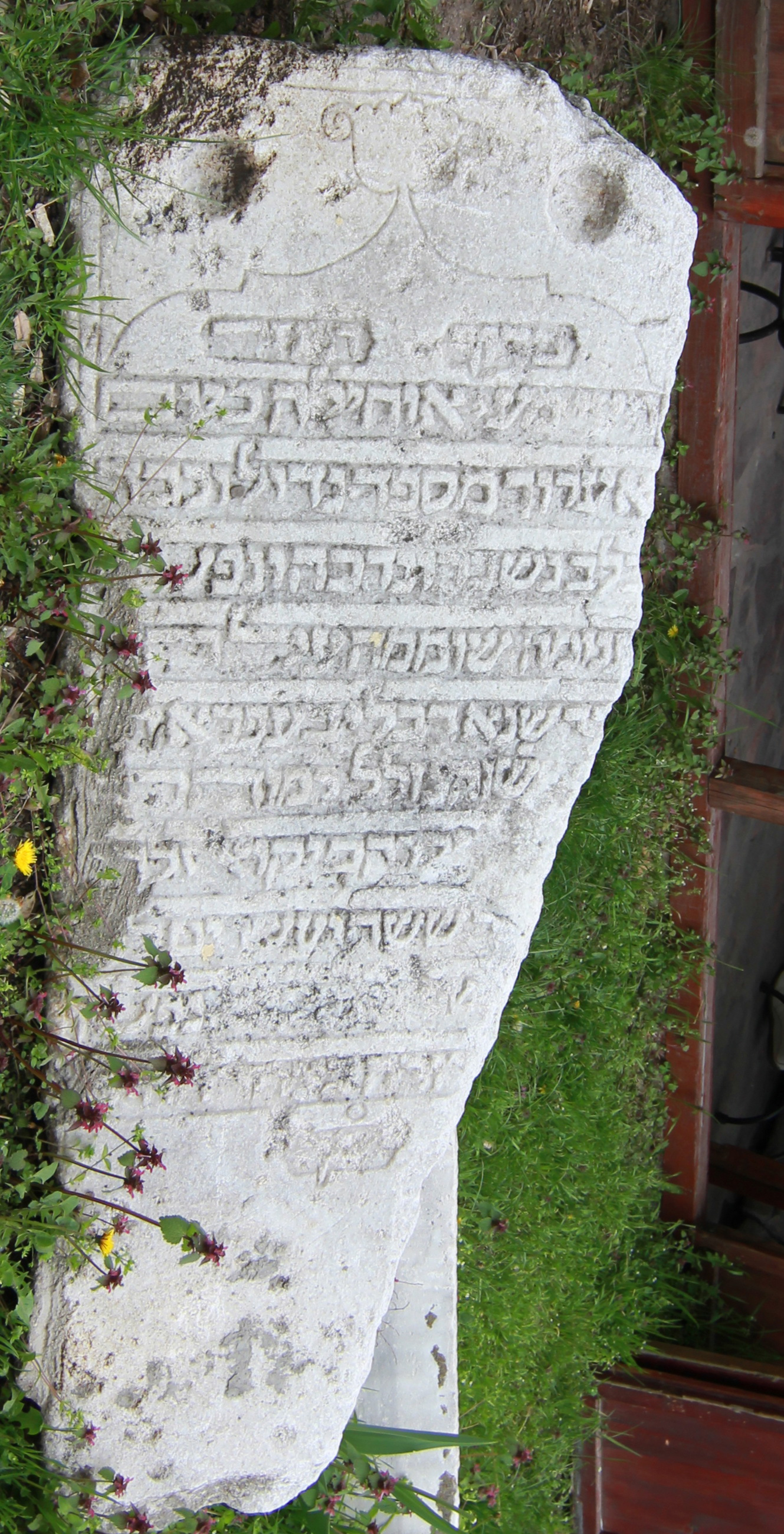
A Jewish stele near the archeological excavations of the early medieval walls of Serdica

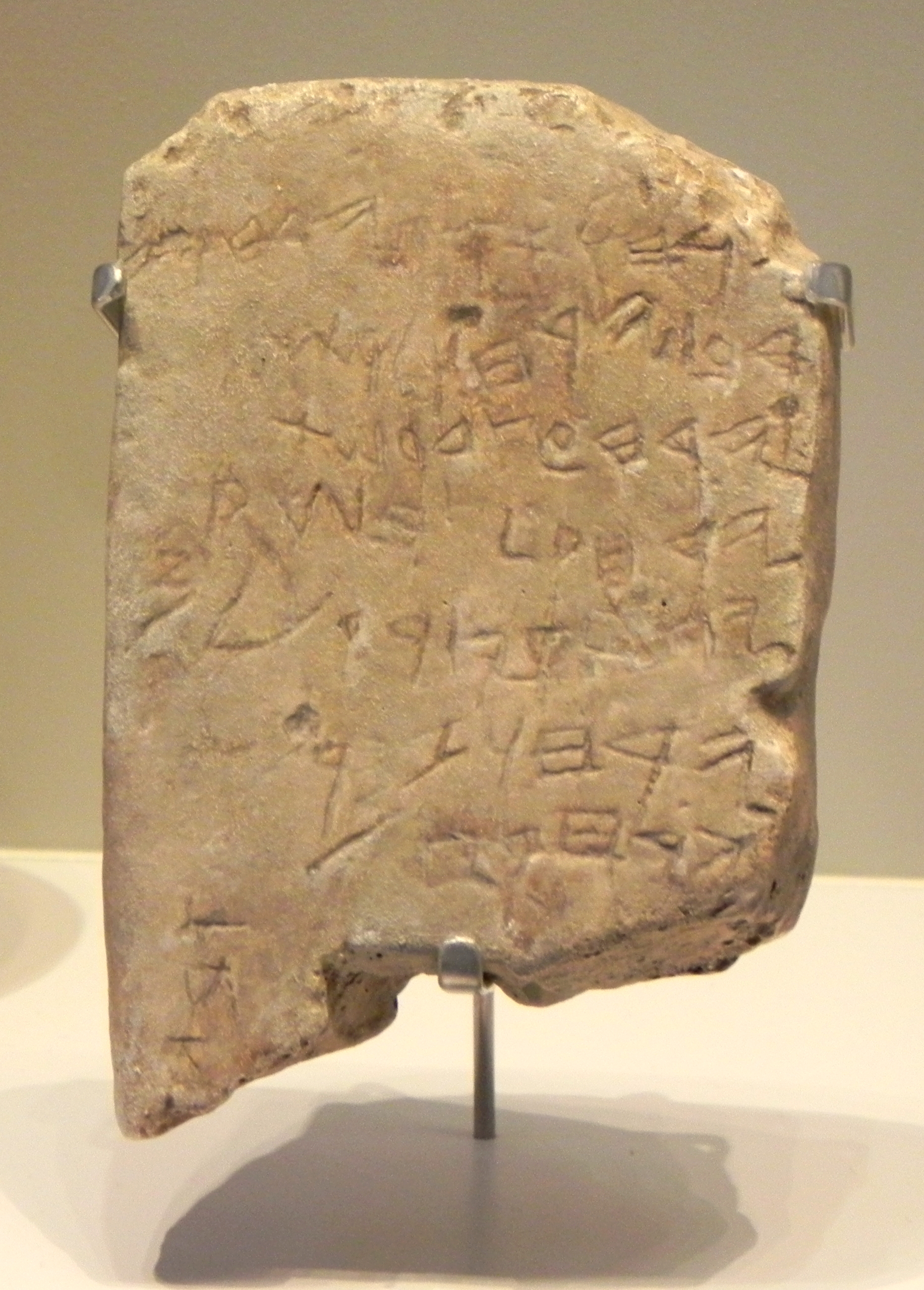
A replica of the Gezer Calendar in the Israel Museum in Jerusalem.

== See also ==
- Cursive Hebrew
- Rashi script
- Vaybertaytsh
- Solitreo
- Proto-Sinaitic alphabet
- Phoenician alphabet
- Paleo-Hebrew alphabet
- Aramaic alphabet
