= Proto-Semitic language =

Hypothetical reconstructed proto-language

Proto-Semitic
- Reconstruction of: Semitic languages
- Era: c. 4500–3900 BC
- Reconstructed ancestor: Proto-Afroasiatic
- Lower-order reconstructions: Proto-Arabic

The Proto-Semitic language is the hypothetical or reconstructed common ancestor of the language family of Semitic languages. The Semitic language family includes Arabic, Amharic, Tigrinya, Tigre, Aramaic, Hebrew, Maltese, Modern South Arabian languages and numerous other ancient and modern languages. The Semitic language family is considered part of the broader macro-family of Afroasiatic languages.

The reconstruction of Proto-Semitic was originally based primarily on Arabic, whose phonology and morphology (particularly in Classical Arabic) is extremely conservative, and which preserves as contrastive 28 out of the evident 29 consonantal phonemes of Proto-Semitic.

There is disagreement among scholars regarding the location of the linguistic homeland of Proto-Semitic: it may have originated in the Levant, the Sahara, the Horn of Africa, the Arabian Peninsula, or northern Africa.

== Dating ==
The earliest attestations of any Semitic language are in Akkadian, dating to around the 24th to 23rd centuries BCE (see Sargon of Akkad) and the Eblaite language, but earlier evidence of Akkadian comes from personal names in Sumerian texts from the first half of the 3rd millennium BCE. One of the earliest known Akkadian inscriptions was found on a bowl at Ur, addressed to the very early pre-Sargonic king Meskiagnunna of Ur (c. 2485–2450 BCE) by his queen Gan-saman, who is thought to have been from Akkad. The earliest text fragments of West Semitic are snake spells in Egyptian pyramid texts, dated around the mid-3rd millennium BCE.

By definition, Proto-Semitic itself must have been spoken before the emergence of its daughters, so some time before the earliest attestation of Akkadian, and sufficiently long so for the changes leading from it to Akkadian to have taken place, which would place it in the 4th millennium BCE or earlier. On the other hand, the Proto-Semitic language would have continued to be in use at least until the other Semitic languages emerged and took root, after which the Proto-Semitic language would have ceased to be used after a time.

== Linguistic homeland ==
It has been hypothesised by Semiticists that Proto-Semitic is the ancestor of all Semitic languages, and they have attempted to locate the linguistic homeland of this language, which may be considered within the context of the larger Afroasiatic family to which it belongs.

The previously popular hypothesis of the Arabian linguistic homeland has been largely abandoned on the basis that the region could not have supported massive waves of emigration before the domestication of camels in the 2nd millennium BCE.

Several lines of evidence indicate that important groups of early Semitic-speaking peoples originated in northern Arabia and the Syro-Arabian desert and moved into the Levant and Mesopotamia long before the widespread use of domesticated camels. From a geographical and historical perspective, the so-called Syro-Arabian Desert forms a single steppe-and-desert belt stretching from the Arabian Sea and the Persian Gulf towards the Taurus foothills, with the Syrian steppe (Badiyat al-Sham) acting as a central corridor and gathering ground for Arab tribal groups moving between northern Arabia, the Levant and Mesopotamia from the Bronze Age into the Islamic and modern periods. The earliest securely attested Semitic languages, such as Akkadian and Eblaite, are already documented in Mesopotamia and the northeastern Levant by the mid-3rd millennium BCE, several centuries before the Iron Age and any firm archaeological evidence for camel-based pastoralism. By contrast, archaeozoological, archaeological and genetic studies place the regular use and full domestication of the dromedary camel as a pack and riding animal in Arabia and neighbouring regions only in the late 2nd millennium BCE, roughly 1200–1000 BCE. This chronological gap shows that the initial dispersal of Semitic-speaking peoples into the Fertile Crescent cannot be explained by reliance on camels and must instead have proceeded through earlier forms of pastoral and agro-pastoral mobility based on other livestock and overland routes.

There is also evidence that Mesopotamia and adjoining areas of modern Syria were originally inhabited by non-Semitic peoples, distinct from the later Semitic-speaking tribal groups who entered these regions from the Syro–Arabian steppe. Non-Semitic toponyms preserved in Akkadian and Eblaite sources, alongside lexemes that are neither Sumerian nor early Semitic (proto-Akkadian), point to one or more pre-Semitic linguistic strata in both southern Mesopotamia and northern Syria. In his classic overview of Mesopotamian civilization, Oppenheim already stressed that the material culture of early Mesopotamia “contains terms and designations that do not seem to be Sumerian and do not belong to any early Semitic (proto-Akkadian) language,” a formulation later taken up and systematized in discussions of a so-called “Proto-Euphratean” or related substratum to account for opaque place names, divine names and technical vocabulary.

A similar picture emerges for northern Syria: Gelb and subsequent onomastic studies have argued that many of the earliest attested toponyms there are neither Semitic nor Hurrian and therefore reflect an older, pre-Semitic population of “unknown ethnic affiliation,” with clearly West-Semitic place names appearing only in a later layer. Even at Ebla, where the language of the archives is Semitic, the onomastic and religious repertoire preserves a mixture of Semitic, Sumerian and as yet unidentified non-Semitic names that point to complex interactions with earlier populations in Syria and Mesopotamia. In contrast, references to mobile Semitic-speaking groups (Akkadians, Amorites, later Arameans and “Western Semites”) on the fringes of the Syro–Arabian desert and their gradual penetration into the settled river valleys belong to a subsequent horizon, representing later tribal and linguistic layers superimposed upon these older, non-Semitic inhabitants rather than the first peopling of Mesopotamia and Syria.

However, none of these considerations contradict the Levant hypothesis.

=== Levant hypothesis ===
A Bayesian analysis performed in 2009 suggests an origin for all known Semitic languages in the Levant around 3750 BCE, with a later single introduction from South Arabia into the Horn of Africa around 800 BCE. This statistical analysis could not, however, estimate when or where the ancestor of all Semitic languages, Proto-Semitic, diverged from Afroasiatic. It thus neither contradicts nor confirms the hypothesis that the divergence of Proto-Semitic from Afroasiatic occurred in Africa.

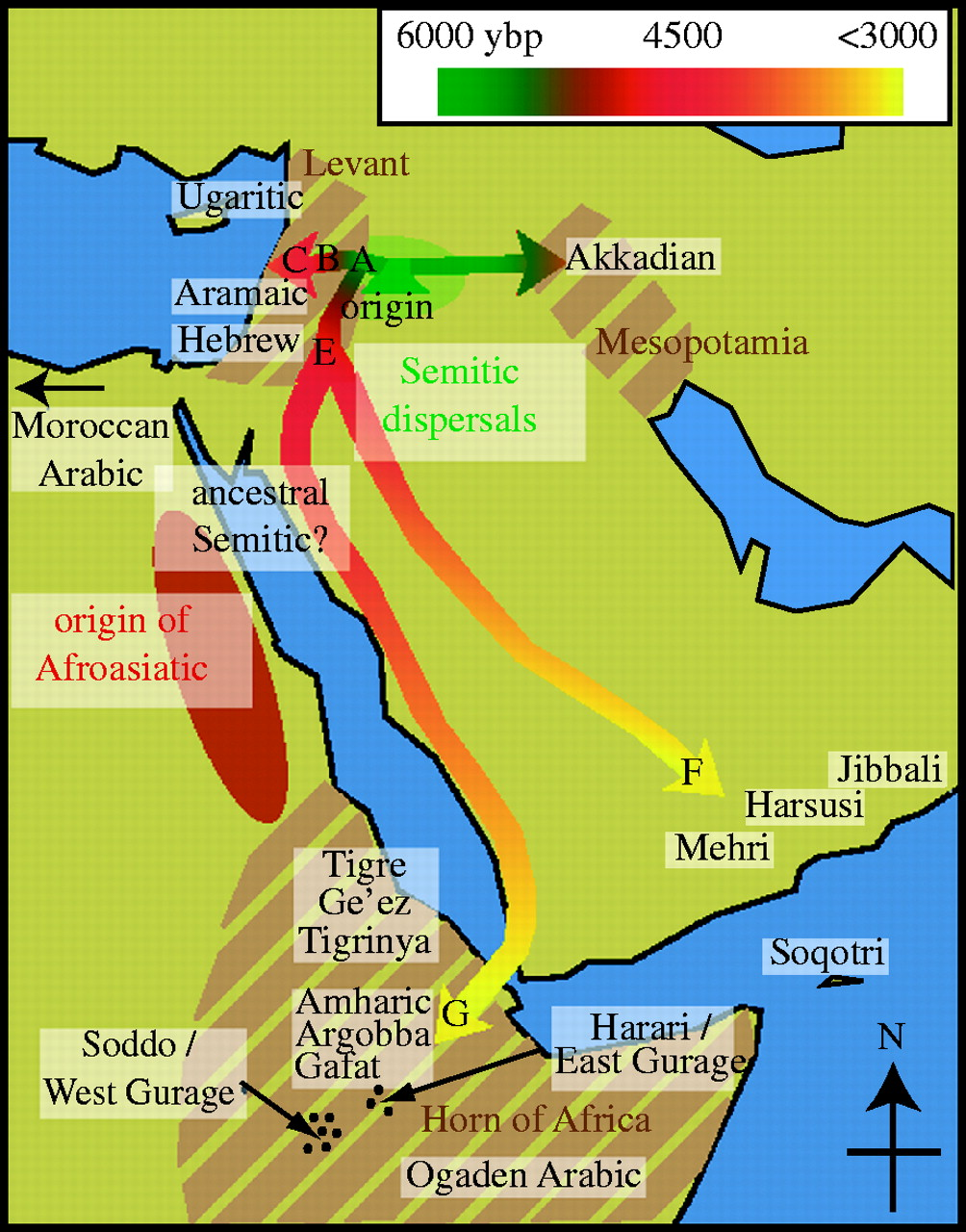
Map of Semitic languages and statistically inferred dispersals. One hypothesized location of the divergence of ancestral Semitic from Afroasiatic between the African coast of the Red Sea and the Near East is also indicated.

In another variant of the theory, the earliest wave of Semitic speakers entered the Fertile Crescent via the Levant and eventually founded the Akkadian Empire. Their relatives, the Amorites, followed them and settled Syria before 2500 BCE. Late Bronze Age collapse in present-day Israel led the South Semitic settlers to migrate southwards where they settled Yemen after the 20th century BCE until those crossed Bab-el-Mandeb to the Horn of Africa between 1500 and 500 BCE.

Several lines of evidence suggest that the scenario just outlined concerns relatively late, historically specific phases in the spread of Semitic and does not describe the earliest movements that first carried Semitic speech into the Levant and Mesopotamia. Kitchen et al.’s Bayesian analysis explicitly dates only the diversification of the attested Semitic branches and places their common ancestor in the Early Bronze Age Levant, while also supporting a single, much later introduction of Ethiosemitic from South Arabia into the Horn of Africa in the late second or early first millennium BCE, in line with the epigraphic and archaeological record for early Geʽez and the kingdom of Dʿmt. This makes the south-Arabian to Horn of Africa dispersal a secondary, first-millennium-BCE development rather than a primary homeland event and leaves open the question of when and where Proto-Semitic itself diverged from Afroasiatic. As several surveys emphasize, the Syro–Arabian desert and adjacent steppe form a single ecological and tribal zone stretching from northern Arabia through Badiyat al-Sham to upper Mesopotamia, within which Semitic-speaking pastoralists are securely attested from the late 3rd and especially the 2nd and 1st millennia BCE, making north Arabia and the adjoining Syrian steppe a plausible early centre for dispersals into both the Levant and Mesopotamia. On this view, any southward migrations of so-called South Semitic settlers from the Levant or northern Syria into Yemen and across the Red Sea in the late Bronze and early Iron Ages represent later waves layered over much older north-Arabian and Syro–Arabian processes of Semiticization, rather than the initial point of origin for the family as a whole.

However, these are not decisive arguments, and the primary division of Semitic into West Semitic and East Semitic inside the Levant continues to argue for a northern homeland.

== Phonology ==
=== Vowels ===
Proto-Semitic had a simple vowel system, with three qualities *a, *i, *u, and phonemic vowel length, conventionally indicated by a macron: *ā, *ī, *ū. This system is preserved in Classical Arabic.

=== Consonants ===
The reconstruction of Proto-Semitic was originally based primarily on Arabic, whose phonology and morphology (particularly in Classical Arabic) is extremely conservative, and which preserves as contrastive 28 out of the evident 29 consonantal phonemes. Thus, the phonemic inventory of reconstructed Proto-Semitic is very similar to that of Arabic, with only one phoneme fewer in Arabic than in reconstructed Proto-Semitic, with *s and *š merging into Arabic /s/ ⟨س⟩ and *ś becoming Arabic /ʃ/ ⟨ش⟩. As such, Proto-Semitic is generally reconstructed as having the following phonemes (as usually transcribed in Semitology):

Proto-Semitic consonant phonemes
Type	Manner	Voicing	Labial	Interdental	Alveolar	Palatal	Lateral	Velar/Uvular	Pharyngeal	Glottal
Obstruent	Stop	voiceless	*p [p]		*t [t]			*k [k]		
Obstruent	Stop	emphatic	(pʼ) (Note: Woodard (2008, p. 219) suggests the presence of an emphatic p in some disparate Semitic languages may indicate that such an emphatic was present in Proto-Semitic.)		*ṭ [tʼ]			*q/ḳ [kʼ]		*ʼ,ˀ [ʔ]
Obstruent	Stop	voiced	*b [b]		*d [d]			*g [g]		
Obstruent	Fricative	voiceless		*ṯ/θ [θ]	*s [s]	*š [ʃ]	*ś [ɬ]	*ḫ/k̇ [x~χ]	*ḥ [ħ]	*h [h]
Obstruent	Fricative	emphatic		*ṯ̣/θ̣/ẓ [θʼ]	*ṣ [sʼ]		*ṣ́/ḏ̣ [ɬʼ]	(xʼ~χʼ) (Note: Huehnergard (2003, p.49) presents a minority opinion that an ejective velar fricative existed in Proto-Semitic.)		
Obstruent	Fricative	voiced		*ḏ [ð]	*z [z]			*ǵ/*ġ [ɣ~ʁ]	*ʻ,ˤ [ʕ]	
Resonant	Trill				*r [r]					
Resonant	Approximant		*w/u [w]			*y/i [j]	*l [l]			
Resonant	Nasal		*m [m]		*n [n]					

The reconstructed phonemes *s *z *ṣ *ś *ṣ́ *ṯ̣ may be interpreted as fricatives (/s z sʼ ɬ ɬʼ θʼ/) or as affricates, as discussed below. The fricative interpretation was the traditional reconstruction, and is reflected in the choice of signs.

The Proto-Semitic consonant system is based on triads of related voiceless, voiced and "emphatic" consonants. Five such triads are reconstructed in Proto-Semitic:

- Dental stops *d *t *ṭ
- Velar stops *g *k *ḳ (normally written *g *k *q)
- Dental sibilants *z *s *ṣ
- Interdental /ð θ θʼ/ (written *ḏ *ṯ *ṯ̣)
- Lateral /l ɬ ɬʼ/ (normally written *l *ś *ṣ́)

The probable phonetic realization of most consonants is straightforward and is indicated in the table with the International Phonetic Alphabet (IPA). Two subsets of consonants, however, deserve further comment.

Voiceless consonants
Proto-Semitic		Old South Arabian	Old North Arabian	Modern South Arabian ^{1, 2}	Standard Arabic		Aramaic		Modern Hebrew		Ge'ez		Phoenician		Akkadian
s₃ (s)	[s] / [ts]	𐩯	𐪏	/s/	س	/s/	ס	s	ס	/s/	ሰ	s	𐤎	s	s
s₁ (š)	[ʃ] / [s]	𐩪	𐪊	/ʃ/, sometimes /h/	س	/s/	ש	š	שׁ	/ʃ/	ሰ	s	𐤔	š	š
ṯ	[θ]	𐩻	𐪛	/θ/	ث	/θ/	ש, later ת	*ṯ, š, later t	שׁ	/ʃ/	ሰ	s	𐤔	š	š
s₂ (ś)	[ɬ]	𐩦	𐪆	/ɬ/	ش	/ʃ/	ש, later ס	*ś, s	שׂ	/s/	ሠ	ś	𐤔	š	š
Emphatic consonants
Proto-Semitic		Old South Arabian	Old North Arabian	Modern South Arabian	Standard Arabic		Aramaic		Modern Hebrew		Ge'ez		Phoenician		Akkadian
ṣ	[sʼ] / [tsʼ]	𐩮	𐪎	/sʼ/, rarely /ʃʼ/	ص	/sˤ/	צ	ṣ	צ	/t͡s/	ጸ	ṣ	𐤑	ṣ	ṣ
ṯ̣	[θʼ]	𐩼	𐪜	/θʼ ~ ðˤ/	ظ	/ðˤ/	צ, later ט	*ṱ, ṣ, later ṭ	צ	/t͡s/	ጸ	ṣ	𐤑	ṣ	ṣ
ṣ́	[ɬʼ] / [tɬʼ]	𐩳	𐪓	/ɬʼ/	ض	/dˤ/	ק, later ע	*ṣ́, q/ḳ, later ʿ	צ	/t͡s/	ፀ	ṣ́	𐤑	ṣ	ṣ
Voiced consonants
Proto-Semitic		Old South Arabian	Old North Arabian	Modern South Arabian	Standard Arabic		Aramaic		Modern Hebrew		Ge'ez		Phoenician		Akkadian
z	[z] / [dz]	𐩸	𐪘	/z/	ز	/z/	ז	z	ז	/z/	ዘ	z	𐤆	z	z
ḏ	[ð]	𐩹	𐪙	/ð/	ذ	/ð/	ז, later ד	*ḏ, z, later d	ז	/z/	ዘ	z	𐤆	z	z
Notes: 1. s₁ (š) is [ʃ], sometimes [h] and [j^{ɦ}] (in Soqotri) - [ʃ] and [ɕ^{w}] (for some speakers of Jibbali); 2. ṯ [θ], ḏ [ð] and ṯ̣ [θʼ] merge with [t], [d], and [tʼ] in Soqotri

==== Emphatics ====
The sounds notated here as "emphatic consonants" occur in nearly all Semitic languages as well as in most other Afroasiatic languages, and they are generally reconstructed as glottalization in Proto-Semitic. (Note: That explains the lack of voicing distinction in the emphatic series, which would be unnecessary if the emphatics were pharyngealized.) Thus, *ṭ, for example, represents [tʼ]. See below for the fricatives/affricates.

In modern Semitic languages, emphatics are variously realized as pharyngealized (Arabic, Aramaic, Tiberian Hebrew (such as [tˤ])), glottalized (Ethiopian Semitic languages, Modern South Arabian languages, such as [tʼ]), or as tenuis consonants (Turoyo language of Tur Abdin such as [t˭]); Ashkenazi Hebrew and Maltese are exceptions and emphatics merge into plain consonants in various ways under the influence of Indo-European languages (Sicilian for Maltese, various languages for Hebrew).

An emphatic labial *ṗ occurs in some Semitic languages, but it is unclear whether it was a phoneme in Proto-Semitic.

- The classical Ethiopian Semitic language Geʽez is unique among Semitic languages for contrasting all three of /p/, /f/, and /pʼ/. While /p/ and /pʼ/ occur mostly in loanwords (especially from Greek), there are many other occurrences whose origin is less clear (such as hepʼä 'strike', häppälä 'wash clothes').
- According to Hetzron, Hebrew developed an emphatic labial phoneme ṗ to represent unaspirated /p/ in Iranian and Greek.

==== Fricatives ====
The reconstruction of Proto-Semitic has nine fricative sounds that are reflected usually as sibilants in later languages, but whether all were already sibilants in Proto-Semitic is debated:

- Two voiced fricatives *ð, *z that eventually became, for example, /z/ for both in Hebrew and Geʽez (/ð/ in early Geʽez), but /ð/ and /z/ in Arabic respectively
- Four voiceless fricatives
  - *θ (*ṯ) that became /ʃ/ in Hebrew (שׁ) but /θ/ in Arabic and /s/ in Geʽez (/θ/ in early Geʽez)
  - *š (*s₁) that became /ʃ/ in Hebrew (שׁ) but /s/ in Arabic and Geʽez
  - *ś (*s₂) that became /s/ (שׂ, transcribed ś) in Hebrew, /ʃ/ in Arabic and /ɬ/ in Geʽez
  - *s (*s₃) that became /s/ in Hebrew, Arabic and Geʽez
- Three emphatic fricatives (*θ̣, *ṣ, *ṣ́)

The precise sound of the Proto-Semitic fricatives, notably of *š, *ś, *s and *ṣ, remains a perplexing problem, and there are various systems of notation to describe them. The notation given here is traditional and is based on their pronunciation in Hebrew, which has traditionally been extrapolated to Proto-Semitic. The notation *s₁, *s₂, *s₃ is found primarily in the literature on Old South Arabian, but more recently, it has been used by some authors to discuss Proto-Semitic to express a noncommittal view of the pronunciation of the sounds. However, the older transcription remains predominant in most literature, often even among scholars who either disagree with the traditional interpretation or remain noncommittal.

The traditional view, as expressed in the conventional transcription and still maintained by some of the authors in the field is that *š was a voiceless postalveolar fricative ([ʃ]), *s was a voiceless alveolar sibilant ([s]) and *ś was a voiceless alveolar lateral fricative ([ɬ]). Accordingly, *ṣ is seen as an emphatic version of *s ([sʼ]) *z as a voiced version of it ([z]) and *ṣ́ as an emphatic version of *ś ([ɬʼ]). The reconstruction of *ś ṣ́ as lateral fricatives (or affricates) is certain although few modern languages preserve the sounds. The pronunciation of *ś ṣ́ as [ɬ ɬʼ] is still maintained in the Modern South Arabian languages (such as Mehri), and evidence of a former lateral pronunciation is evident in a number of other languages. For example, Biblical Hebrew baśam was borrowed into Ancient Greek as balsamon (hence English "balsam"), and the 8th-century Arab grammarian Sibawayh explicitly described the Arabic descendant of *ṣ́, now pronounced [dˤ] in the standard pronunciation or [ðˤ] in Bedouin-influenced dialects, as a pharyngealized voiced lateral fricative [ɮˤ]. (Compare Spanish alcalde, from Andalusian Arabic اَلْقَاضِي al-qāḍī "judge".)

The primary disagreements concern whether the sounds were actually fricatives in Proto-Semitic or whether some were affricates, and whether the sound designated *š was pronounced [ʃ] (or similar) in Proto-Semitic, as the traditional view posits, or had the value of [s]. The issue of the nature of the "emphatic" consonants, discussed above, is partly related (but partly orthogonal) to the issues here as well.

With respect to the traditional view, there are two dimensions of "minimal" and "maximal" modifications made:

1. In how many sounds are taken to be affricates. The "minimal affricate" position takes only the emphatic *ṣ as an affricate [t͡sʼ]. The "maximal affricate" position additionally posits that *s *z were actually affricates [t͡s d͡z] while *š was actually a simple fricative [s].
2. In whether to extend the affricate interpretation to the interdentals and laterals. The "minimal extension" position assumes that only the sibilants were affricates, and the other "fricatives" were in fact all fricatives, but the maximal update extends the same interpretation to the other sounds. Typically, that means that the "minimal affricate, maximal extension" position takes all and only the emphatics are taken as affricates: emphatic *ṣ θ̣ ṣ́ were [t͡sʼ t͡θʼ t͡ɬʼ]. The "maximal affricate, maximal extension" position assumes not only the "maximal affricate" position for sibilants but also that non-emphatic *θ ð ś were actually affricates.

Affricates in Proto-Semitic were proposed early on but met little acceptance until the work of Alice Faber (1981), who challenged the older approach. The Semitic languages that have survived often have fricatives for these consonants. However, Ethiopic languages and Modern Hebrew, in many reading traditions, have an affricate for *ṣ.

The evidence for the various affricate interpretations of the sibilants is direct evidence from transcriptions and structural evidence. However, the evidence for the "maximal extension" positions that extend affricate interpretations to non-sibilant "fricatives" is largely structural because of both the relative rarity of the interdentals and lateral obstruents among the attested Semitic language and the even greater rarity of such sounds among the various languages in which Semitic words were transcribed. As a result, even when the sounds were transcribed, the resulting transcriptions may be difficult to interpret clearly.

The narrowest affricate view (only *ṣ was an affricate [t͡sʼ]) is the most accepted one. The affricate pronunciation is directly attested in the modern Ethiopic languages and Modern Hebrew, as mentioned above, but also in ancient transcriptions of numerous Semitic languages in various other languages:

- Transcriptions of Ge'ez from the period of the Axumite Kingdom (early centuries AD): ṣəyāmo rendered as Greek τζιαμω tziamō.
- The Hebrew reading tradition of ṣ as [t͡s] clearly goes back at least to medieval times, as shown by the use of Hebrew צ (ṣ) to represent affricates in early New Persian, Old Osmanli Turkic, Middle High German, Yiddish, etc. Similarly, in Old French c /t͡s/ was used to transliterate צ: Hebrew ṣɛdɛḳ "righteousness" and ʼārɛṣ "land (of Israel)" were written cedek, arec.
- There is also evidence of an affricate in Ancient Hebrew and Phoenician ṣ. Punic ṣ was often transcribed as ts or t in Latin and Greek or occasionally Greek ks; correspondingly, Egyptian names and loanwords in Hebrew and Phoenician use ṣ to represent the Egyptian palatal affricate ḏ (conventionally described as voiced [d͡ʒ] but possibly instead an unvoiced ejective [t͡ʃʼ]).
- Aramaic and Syriac had an affricated realization of *ṣ until some point, as is seen in Classical Armenian loanwords: Aramaic צרר 'bundle, bunch' → Classical Armenian crar /t͡sɹaɹ/.

The "maximal affricate" view, applied only to sibilants, also has transcriptional evidence. According to Kogan, the affricate interpretation of Akkadian s z ṣ is generally accepted.

- Akkadian cuneiform, as adapted for writing various other languages, used the z- signs to represent affricates. Examples include /ts/ in Hittite, Egyptian affricate ṯ in the Amarna letters and the Old Iranian affricates /t͡ʃ d͡ʒ/ in Elamite.
- Egyptian transcriptions of early Canaanite words with *z, *s, *ṣ use affricates (ṯ for *s, ḏ for *z, *ṣ).
- West Semitic loanwords in the "older stratum" of Armenian reflect *s *z as affricates /t͡sʰ/, /d͡z/.
- Greek borrowing of Phoenician 𐤔 *š to represent /s/ (compare Greek Σ), and 𐤎 *s to represent /ks/ (compare Greek Ξ) is difficult to explain if *s then had the value [s] in Phoenician, but it is quite easy to explain if it actually had the value [t͡s] (even more so if *š had the value [s]).
- Similarly, Phoenician uses 𐤔 *š to represent sibilant fricatives in other languages rather than 𐤎 *s until the mid-3rd century BC, which has been taken by Friedrich/Röllig 1999 (pp. 27–28) as evidence of an affricate pronunciation in Phoenician until then. On the other hand, Egyptian starts using s in place of earlier ṯ to represent Canaanite s around 1000 BC. As a result, Kogan assumes a much earlier loss of affricates in Phoenician, and he assumes that the foreign sibilant fricatives in question had a sound closer to [ʃ] than [s]. (A similar interpretation for at least Latin s has been proposed by various linguists based on evidence of similar pronunciations of written s in a number of early medieval Romance languages; a technical term for this "intermediate" sibilant is voiceless alveolar retracted sibilant.) However, it is likely that Canaanite was already dialectally split by that time and the northern, Early Phoenician dialect that the Greeks were in contact with could have preserved the affricate pronunciation until c. 800 BC at least, unlike the more southern Canaanite dialects that the Egyptians were in contact with, so that there is no contradiction.

There is also a good deal of internal evidence in early Akkadian for affricate realizations of s z ṣ. Examples are that underlying ||*t, *d, *ṭ + *š|| were realized as ss, which is more natural if the law was phonetically ||*t, *d, *ṭ + *s|| > [tt͡s], and that *s *z *ṣ shift to *š before *t, which is more naturally interpreted as deaffrication.

Evidence for *š as /s/ also exists but is somewhat less clear. It has been suggested that it is cross-linguistically rare for languages with a single sibilant fricative to have [ʃ] as the sound and that [s] is more likely. Similarly, the use of Phoenician 𐤔 *š, as the source of Greek Σ s, seems easiest to explain if the phoneme had the sound of [s] at the time. The occurrence of [ʃ] for *š in a number of separate modern Semitic languages (such as Neo-Aramaic, Modern South Arabian, most Biblical Hebrew reading traditions) and Old Babylonian Akkadian is then suggested to result from a push-type chain shift, and the change from [t͡s] to [s] "pushes" [s] out of the way to [ʃ] in the languages in question, and a merger of the two to [s] occurs in various other languages such as Arabic and Ethiopian Semitic.

On the other hand, Kogan has suggested that the initial merged s in Arabic was actually a "hissing-hushing sibilant", presumably something like [ɕ] (or a "retracted sibilant"), which did not become [s] until later. That would suggest a value closer to [ɕ] (or a "retracted sibilant") or [ʃ] for Proto-Semitic *š since [t͡s] and [s] would almost certainly merge directly to [s]. Furthermore, there is various evidence to suggest that the sound [ʃ] for *š existed while *s was still [ts]. Examples are the Southern Old Babylonian form of Akkadian, which evidently had [ʃ] along with [t͡s] as well as Egyptian transcriptions of early Canaanite words in which *š s are rendered as š ṯ. (ṯ is an affricate [t͡ʃ] and the consensus interpretation of š is [ʃ], as in Modern Coptic.)

Diem (1974) suggested that the Canaanite sound change of *θ > *š would be more natural if *š was [s] than if it was [ʃ]. However, Kogan argues that, because *s was [ts] at the time, the change from *θ to *š is the most likely merger, regardless of the exact pronunciation of *š while the shift was underway.

Evidence for the affricate nature of the non-sibilants is based mostly on internal considerations. Ejective fricatives are quite rare cross-linguistically, and when a language has such sounds, it nearly always has [sʼ] so if *ṣ was actually affricate [tsʼ], it would be extremely unusual if *θ̣ ṣ́ was fricative [θʼ ɬʼ] rather than affricate [t͡θʼ t͡ɬʼ]. According to Rodinson (1981) and Weninger (1998), the Greek placename Mátlia, with tl used to render Ge'ez ḍ (Proto-Semitic *ṣ́), is "clear proof" that this sound was affricated in Ge'ez and quite possibly in Proto-Semitic as well.

The evidence for the most maximal interpretation, with all the interdentals and lateral obstruents being affricates, appears to be mostly structural: the system would be more symmetric if reconstructed that way.

The shift of *š to h occurred in most Semitic languages (other than Akkadian, Minaean, Qatabanian) in grammatical and pronominal morphemes, and it is unclear whether reduction of *š began in a daughter proto-language or in Proto-Semitic itself. Some thus suggest that weakened *š̱ may have been a separate phoneme in Proto-Semitic.

=== Prosody ===
Proto-Semitic is reconstructed as having non-phonemic stress on the third mora counted from the end of the word, i.e. on the second syllable from the end, if it has the structure CVC or CVː (where C is any consonant and V is any vowel), or on the third syllable from the end, if the second one had the structure CV.

=== Morphophonology ===
Proto-Semitic allowed only syllables of the structures CVC, CVː, or CV. It did not permit word-final clusters of two or more consonants, clusters of three or more consonants, hiatus of two or more vowels, or long vowels in closed syllables.

Most roots consisted of three consonants. However, it appears that historically the three-consonant roots had developed from two-consonant ones (this is suggested by evidence from internal as well as external reconstruction). To construct a given grammatical form, certain vowels were inserted between the consonants of the root. There were certain restrictions on the structure of the root: it was impossible to have roots where the first and second consonants were identical, and roots where the first and third consonants were identical were extremely rare.

== Grammar ==
=== Nouns ===
Three cases are reconstructed: nominative (marked by *-u), genitive (marked by *-i), accusative (marked by *-a).

There were two genders: masculine (marked by a zero morpheme) and feminine (marked by *-at/*-t and *-ah/-ā). The feminine marker was placed after the root, but before the ending, e.g.: *ba‘l- ‘lord, master’ > *ba‘lat- ‘lady, mistress’, *bin- ‘son’ > *bint- ‘daughter’. There was also a small group of feminine nouns that had no formal markers: *’imm- ‘mother’, *laxir- ‘ewe’, *’atān- ‘she-donkey’, *‘ayn- ‘eye’, *birk- ‘knee’

There were three numbers: singular, plural and dual.

There were two ways to mark the plural:

- affixation
  - masculine nouns formed their nominative by means of the marker *-ū, their genitive and accusative by *-ī, i.e., by lengthening the vowel of the singular case suffix;
  - feminines also formed their plural by lengthening a vowel — namely, by means of the marker *-āt;
- apophonically (by changing the vocalisation pattern of the word, as seen e.g. in Arabic: kātib ‘writer’ — kuttāb ‘writers’) — only in the masculine.

The dual was formed by means of the markers *-ā in the nominative and *-āy in the genitive and accusative.

The endings of the noun:

Case	Singular	Plural	Dual
Nominative	*-u	*-ū	*-ā
Accusative	*-a	*-ī	*-āy
Genitive	*-i	*-ī	*-āy

=== Pronouns ===
Like most of its daughter languages, Proto-Semitic has one free pronoun set, and case-marked bound sets of enclitic pronouns. Genitive case and accusative case are only distinguished in the first person.

Proto-Semitic pronouns
	independent nominative	enclitic		
	independent nominative	nominative	genitive	accusative
1.sg.	ʼanā̆/ʼanākū̆	-kū̆	-ī/-ya	-nī
2.sg.masc.	ʼantā̆	-tā̆	-kā̆	
2.sg.fem.	ʼantī̆	-tī̆	-kī̆	
3.sg.masc.	šuʼa	-a	-šū̆	
3.sg.fem.	šiʼa	-at	-šā̆/-šī̆	
1.du.	?	-nuyā ?	-niyā ?	-nayā ?
2.du.	ʼantumā	-tumā	-kumā/-kumay	
3.du.	šumā	-ā	-šumā/-šumay	
1.pl.	niḥnū̆	-nū̆	-nī̆	-nā̆
2.pl.masc.	ʼantum	-tum	-kum	
2.pl.fem.	ʼantin	-tin	-kin	
3.pl.masc.	šum/šumū	-ū	-šum	
3.pl.fem.	šin/šinnā	-ā	-šin	

For many pronouns, the final vowel is reconstructed with long and short positional variants; this is conventionally indicated by a combined macron and breve on the vowel (e.g. ā̆).

The Semitic demonstrative pronouns are usually divided into two series: those showing a relatively close object and those showing a more distant one. Nonetheless, it is very difficult to reconstruct Proto-Semitic forms on the basis of the demonstratives of the individual Semitic languages.

A series of interrogative pronouns are reconstructed for Proto-Semitic: *man ‘who’, *mā ‘what’ and *’ayyu ‘of what kind’ (derived from *’ay ‘where’).

=== Numerals ===
Reconstruction of the cardinal numerals from one to ten (masculine):

	Languages				Reconstruction		
	Akkadian	Ugaritic	Arabic	Sabean	Weninger	Lipiński	Huehnergard
One	ištēnum	ʔaḥd	wāḥid	’ḥd	*’aḥad-	*ḥad-, *‘išt-	*ʔaħad-
Two	šena/šina	ṯn	iṯnān	ṯny	*ṯinān	*ṯin-, *kil’-	*θin̩-/*θn̩-
Three	šalāšum	ṯlṯ	ṯalāṯ	s_{2}lṯ	*śalāṯ-	*ślaṯ-	*θalaːθ-
Four	erbûm	ʔarbʻ	’arbaʻ	’rbʻ	*’arbaʻ-	*rbaʻ-	*ʔarbaʕ-
Five	ḫamšum	ḫmš	ḫams	ḫms_{1}	*ḫamš-	*ḫamš-	*xamis-
Six	ši/eššum	ṯṯ	sitt	s_{1}dṯ/s_{1}ṯ-	*šidṯ-	*šidṯ-	*sidθ-
Seven	sebûm	šbʻ	sabʻ	s_{1}bʻ	*šabʻ-	*šabʻ-	*sabʕ-
Eight	samānûm	ṯmn	ṯamānī	ṯmny/ṯmn	*ṯamāniy-	*ṯmān-	*θamaːniy-
Nine	tišûm	tšʻ	tisʻ	ts_{1}ʻ	*tišʻ-	*tišʻ-	*tisʕ-
Ten	ešrum	ʻšr	ʻašr	ʻs_{2}r	*ʻaśr-	*ʻaśr-	*ʕaɬr-

All nouns from one to ten were declined as singular nouns with the exception of the numeral ‘two’, which was declined as a dual. Feminine forms of all numbers from one to ten were produced by the suffix *-at. In addition, if the name of the object counted was of the feminine gender, the numbers from 3 to 10 were in the masculine form and vice versa.

The names of the numerals from 11 to 19 were formed by combining the names of the unit digits with the word ‘ten’. 'Twenty’ was expressed by the dual form of ‘ten’, and the names of the ten digits from 30 to 90 were plural forms of the corresponding unit digits. Proto-Semitic also had designations for hundred (*mi’t-), thousand (*li’m-) and ten thousand (*ribb-).

Ordinal numerals cannot be reconstructed for the protolanguage because of the great diversity in the descendant languages.

=== Verbs ===
Traditionally, two conjugations are reconstructed for Proto-Semitic — a prefix conjugation and a suffix conjugation. According to a hypothesis that has garnered wide support, the prefix conjugation was used with verbs that expressed actions, and the suffix conjugation was used with verbs that expressed states.

The prefix conjugation is reconstructed as follows:

		Singular	Plural	Dual
1 pers.		*’a-	*ni-	
2 pers.
2 pers.	masc.	*ta-	*ta- – -ū	*ta- – -ā
2 pers.	fem.	*ta- – -ī	*ta- – -ā	*ta- – -ā
3 pers.
3 pers.	masc.	*ya-	*yi- – -ū	*ya- – -ā
3 pers.	fem.	*ta-	*yi- – -ā	*ta- – -ā

The suffix conjugation is reconstructed as follows:

		Singular	Plural	Dual
1 pers.		*-ku	*-na	*-kāya/-nāya
2 pers.
2 pers.	masc.	*-ka/-ta	*-kan(u)/-tanu	*-kā/-tanā
2 pers.	fem.	*-ki/-ti	*-kin(a)/-tina	*-kā/-tanā
3 pers.
3 pers.	masc.	–	*-ū	*-ā
3 pers.	fem.	*-at	*-ā	*-atā

Verb stems are divided into base forms (a "G-stem", from German: Grundstamm) and derived. The bases consist of a three-consonant root with thematic vowels. Among the derived ones, one distinguishes stems with a geminated middle consonant (German: Doppelungsstamm), stems with a lengthened first vowel, causative stems (formed by means of the prefix *ša-), nouns with the prefix *na-/*ni-, stems with the suffix *-tV-, stems that consist of a reduplicated biconsonantal root and stems with a geminated final consonant.

From the basic stems, an active participle was formed on the pattern CāCiC, the passive one on the patterns CaCīC and CaCūC.

From the derived stems, the participles were formed by means of the prefix *mu-, while the vocalisation of the active ones was a-i and that of the passive ones was a-a (on this pattern, for example, the Arabic name muḥammad is formed from the root ḥmd ‘to praise’.)

Proto-Semitic is said to have been a tenseless language, using only the perfective and imperfective aspects.

The imperative mood was formed only for the second person, and the form for the singular masculine was the pure stem:

		Singular	Plural	Dual
2 pers.
2 pers.	masc.	-	*-ū	*-ā
2 pers.	fem.	*-i	*-ā	*-ā

=== Conjunctions ===
Three conjunctions are reconstructed for Proto-Semitic:

- *wa ’and’;
- *’aw ’or’;
- *šimmā ’if’.

=== Syntax ===
The Proto-Semitic language was a language of nominative-accusative alignment, which is preserved in most of its descendant languages.

The basic word order of Proto-Semitic was VSO (verb — subject — direct object), and the modifier usually followed its head.

=== Lexis ===
The Semitic languages in the 1st century AD

Reconstruction of the Proto-Semitic lexicon provides more information about the lives of Proto-Semites and helps in the search for their Urheimat.

Reconstructed terms include:

- Religious terms: *ʔil ‘deity’, *ḏbḥ ‘to perform a sacrifice’, *mšḥ ‘to anoint’, *ḳdš ‘be holy’, *ḥrm ‘to forbid, excommunicate’, *ṣalm- ‘idol’;
- Agricultural terms: *ḥaḳl- ‘field’, *ḥrṯ ‘to plough’, *zrʕ ‘to sow’, *ʻṣ́d ‘to harvest’, *dyš ‘to thresh’, *ḏrw ‘to winnow’, *gurn- ‘threshing-floor’, *ḥinṭ- ‘wheat’, *kunāṯ- ‘emmer’;
- Animal husbandry terms: *raḫil- ‘ewe’, *‘inz- ‘goat’, *śaw- ‘a flock of sheep’, *ṣ́a’n- ‘a herd of sheep and goats’, *gzz ‘to shear sheep’, *r‘y ‘to graze (animals)’, *šḳy ‘to guide to a watering place’, *ʔalp- ‘bull’, *ṯawr- ‘buffalo’, *kalb- ‘dog’, *ḥimār- ‘donkey’, *’atān- ‘she-donkey’, *ḥalab- ‘milk’, *lašad- ‘cream’, *ḫim’at- ‘butter’;
- Terms of daily life: *bayt- ‘house’, *dalt- ‘door’, *ʕarś- ‘bed’, *kry ‘to dig’, *biʔr- ‘well’, *śrp ‘to kindle, *ʔiš- ‘fire’, *ḳly ‘to roast’, *laḥm- ‘food’;
- Technological terms: *ṣrp ‘to smelt’, *paḥḥam- ‘coal’, *kasp- ‘silver’, *ḥabl- ‘rope’, *ḳašt- ‘bow’, *ḥaṱw- ‘arrow’;
- Plants and foods: *tiʔn- ‘fig’, *ṯūm- ‘garlic’, *baṣal- ‘onion’, *dibš- ‘date honey’.

The words *ṯawr- ‘buffalo’ and *ḳarn- ‘horn’ are suspected to be borrowings from Proto-Indo-European or vice versa (for *ṯawr- and certain other words). Sergei Starostin adduces several dozens of Semito-Indo-European correspondences, which he considers to be borrowings into Proto-Semitic from Proto-Anatolian or a disappeared branch of Proto-Indo-European.

== Comparative vocabulary and reconstructed roots ==
See Proto-Semitic stems (appendix in Wiktionary).

== See also ==
- Ancient Semitic-speaking peoples
- History of the Middle East
- Proto-Afroasiatic language
- Semitic studies

== Sources ==
- Blench, Roger (2006). Archaeology, Language, and the African Past. Rowman Altamira. ISBN 978-0-7591-0466-2.
- Dolgopolsky, Aron (1999). From Proto-Semitic to Hebrew. Milan: Centro Studi Camito-Semitici di Milano.
- Hetzron; Robert (1997). The Semitic languages. Cambridge University Press. p. 572. ISBN 0-415-05767-1.
- Huehnergard, John (2000). "Proto-Semitic Language and Culture + Appendix II: Semitic Roots". American Heritage Dictionary of the English Language (Fourth ed.). Boston & New York: Houghton Mifflin Company. pp. 2056–2068. ISBN 0-395-82517-2.
- Huehnergard, John. (2003) "Akkadian ḫ and West Semitic ḥ." Studia Semitica 3, ed. Leonid E. Kogan & Alexander Militarev. Moscow: Russian State University for the Humanities. pp. 102–119. ISBN 978-5-728-10690-6
- Huehnergard, John (2008). "Appendix 1. Afro-Asiatic". In Woodard, Roger (ed.). The Ancient Languages of Syria-Palestine and Arabia. Cambridge University Press. pp. 225–246. ISBN 978-0-521-68498-9.
- Kienast, Burkhart. (2001). Historische semitische Sprachwissenschaft.
- Kogan, Leonid (2011). "Proto-Semitic Phonology and Phonetics". In Weninger, Stefan (ed.). The Semitic Languages: An International Handbook. Walter de Gruyter. pp. 54–151. ISBN 978-3-11-025158-6.
- Lipiński, Edward (2001). Semitic Languages: Outline of a Comparative Grammar. Peeters Publishers. ISBN 978-90-429-0815-4.
- Woodard, Roger (2008). The Ancient Languages of Mesopotamia, Egypt and Aksum. Cambridge University Press. p. 250. ISBN 978-0-521-68497-2.
