= Mem =

Thirteenth letter of many Semitic alphabets

← Lamedh Mem Nun →
- Phoenician: 𐤌
- Hebrew: מם
- Samaritan: ࠌ
- Aramaic: 𐡌
- Syriac: ܡ
- Nabataean: 𐢓𐢒
- Arabic: م
- South Arabian: 𐩣
- Geʽez: መ
- North Arabian: 𐪃
- Ugaritic: 𐎎
- Phonemic representation: m
- Position in alphabet: 13
- Numerical value: 40

Alphabetic derivatives of the Phoenician
- Greek: Μ
- Latin: M
- Cyrillic: М

Mem (also spelled Meem, Meme, or Mim) is the thirteenth letter of the Semitic abjads, including Hebrew mēm מ, Aramaic mem 𐡌, Syriac mīm ܡ, Arabic mīm م, and Phoenician mēm 𐤌. Its sound value is [m]. It is also related to the Ancient North Arabian 𐪃, South Arabian 𐩣, and Ge'ez መ. The Phoenician letter gave rise to the Greek mu (Μ), Etruscan, Latin M, and Cyrillic М.

== Origins ==
Mem is believed to derive from the Egyptian hieroglyphic symbol for water,

N35

which had been simplified in the Proto-Sinaitic script and named after the West Semitic word for "water", mem, as in Biblical Hebrew maym (מַיִם) 'water', ultimately coming from Proto-Semitic *may-.

== Arabic mīm ==
Mīm ميم
- م

Usage
- Writing system: Arabic script
- Type: Abjad
- Language of origin: Arabic language
- Sound values: m
- In Unicode: U+0645 م ARABIC LETTER MEEM
- Alphabetical position: 24

History
- Development: 𐤌; 𐡌; 𐢒, 𐢓

Other
- Writing direction: Right-to-left

The letter is named mīm, and is written in several ways depending on its position in the word:

Position in word:	Isolated	Final	Medial	Initial
Glyph form: (Help)	م	ـم	ـمـ	مـ

Some examples on its uses in Modern Standard Arabic:

Mīm is used in the creation of ism words (i.e. nouns and adjectives; they are treated fundamentally the same in Arabic grammar). Specifically, mīm is used in the creation of the masdar (verbal noun) of Stem III verbs (the masdar of verbs on the pattern fāʿala is mufāʿala), of subject and object nouns for verbs of Stems II-X (using the example of Stem II, subject nouns—called fāʿil words because of their form in Stem I—are mufaʿʿil for verbs of Stems II-X, and object nouns—called mafʿūl also because of their Stem I form—take the form mufaʿʿal for verbs of Stems II-X). Place-nouns are also created with mīm; the pattern mafʿal is used to create maktab "office" from the triliteral k-t-b (to write) and maṣnaʿ "factory" from ṣ-n-ʿ (to make).

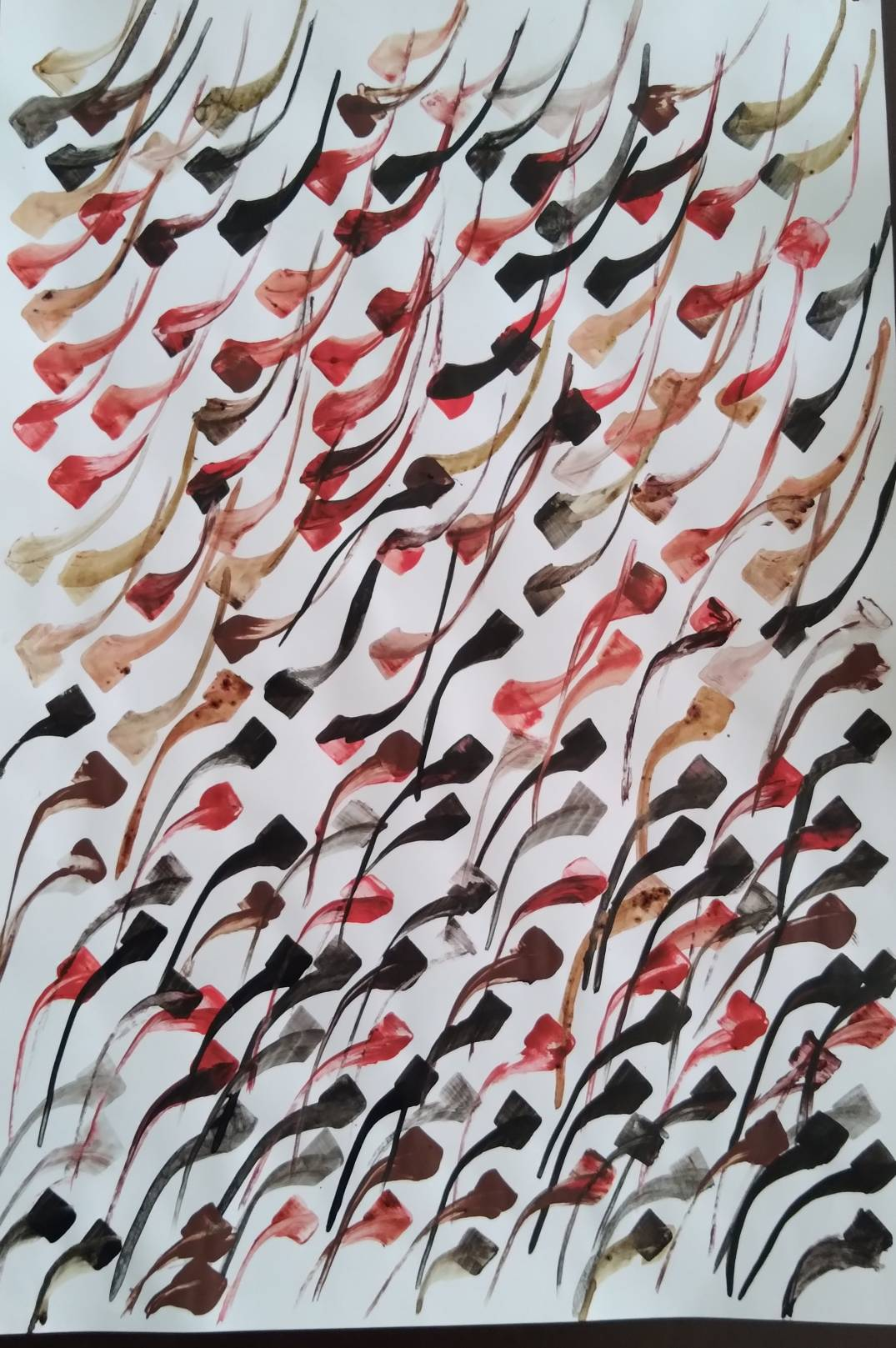
Nastaliq Persian Calligram the Persian letter Mem

== Hebrew mem ==
Orthographic variants of non-final form
Various print fonts			Cursive Hebrew	Solitreo	Rashi script
Serif	Sans-serif	Monospaced	Cursive Hebrew	Solitreo	Rashi script
מ	מ	מ			

Hebrew spelling: מֵם

=== Hebrew pronunciation ===
Mem represents a bilabial nasal [m].

=== Variations on written form/pronunciation ===
Orthographic variants of final form
Various Print Fonts			Cursive Hebrew	Solitreo	Rashi Script
Serif	Sans-serif	Monospaced	Cursive Hebrew	Solitreo	Rashi Script
ם	ם	ם			

In Hebrew, Mem, like Kaph, Nun, Pe, and Tzadi, has a final form, used at the end of words: its shape changes from מ to ם.

=== Significance ===
In gematria, Mem represents the number 40 in both the Standard and Mispar Gadol Methods of Gematriea; However, (mem sofit) final mem's value is 40 in the Standard Method and 600 in the Mispar Gadol method. The Standard Method adds the values of Tav and Resh (400+200) to denote the value of mem sofit.

In the Sefer Yetzirah, the letter Mem is King over Water, Formed Earth in the Universe, Cold in the Year, and the Belly in the Soul.

As an abbreviation, it stands for metre. In the Israeli army it can also stand for mefaked, commander. In Hebrew religious texts, it can stand for the name of God Makom, the Place.

=== Mem and Tarot ===
Mem is associated with The Hanged Man (Atu XII), the element of water and the path between Geburah and Hod on the Tree of Life.

== Syriac mim ==
Position in word:	Isolated	Final	Medial	Initial
Glyph form: (Help)	ܡ	ـܡ	ـܡـ	ܡـ

== Character encodings ==
Character information
Preview	מ		ם		م		ܡ		ࠌ		ﬦ		מּ	
Unicode name	HEBREW LETTER MEM		HEBREW LETTER FINAL MEM		ARABIC LETTER MEEM		SYRIAC LETTER MIM		SAMARITAN LETTER MIM		HEBREW LETTER WIDE FINAL MEM		HEBREW LETTER MEM WITH DAGESH	
Encodings	decimal	hex	dec	hex	dec	hex	dec	hex	dec	hex	dec	hex	dec	hex
Unicode	1502	U+05DE	1501	U+05DD	1605	U+0645	1825	U+0721	2060	U+080C	64294	U+FB26	64318	U+FB3E
UTF-8	215 158	D7 9E	215 157	D7 9D	217 133	D9 85	220 161	DC A1	224 160 140	E0 A0 8C	239 172 166	EF AC A6	239 172 190	EF AC BE
Numeric character reference	&#1502;	&#x5DE;	&#1501;	&#x5DD;	&#1605;	&#x645;	&#1825;	&#x721;	&#2060;	&#x80C;	&#64294;	&#xFB26;	&#64318;	&#xFB3E;

Character information
Preview	𐎎		𐡌		𐤌	
Unicode name	UGARITIC LETTER MEM		IMPERIAL ARAMAIC LETTER MEM		PHOENICIAN LETTER MEM	
Encodings	decimal	hex	dec	hex	dec	hex
Unicode	66446	U+1038E	67660	U+1084C	67852	U+1090C
UTF-8	240 144 142 142	F0 90 8E 8E	240 144 161 140	F0 90 A1 8C	240 144 164 140	F0 90 A4 8C
UTF-16	55296 57230	D800 DF8E	55298 56396	D802 DC4C	55298 56588	D802 DD0C
Numeric character reference	&#66446;	&#x1038E;	&#67660;	&#x1084C;	&#67852;	&#x1090C;

== See also ==
- Nun (letter)
