= Abraham Garton =

Jewish printer

Abraham Garton was a Jewish printer who printed the first dated Hebrew book in Europe in 1475.

Very little is known about the personal life of Abraham ben Garton. Most scholars believe he was born in Spain, and emigrated to Calabria, Italy prior to the expulsion of the Jews from Spain in 1492. Many other Spanish Sephardim also emigrated to Calabria following the expulsion.

Garton's first book was Rashi's commentary on the written Torah. This was printed in the city of Reggio di Calabria, in February, 1475.

Although Garton's book is the first dated printed edition, the work is neither the first edition of Rashi's commentary, nor the first book to be printed in Hebrew. Between 1469 and 1472 three brothers, Obadiah, Menasseh, and Benjamin of Rome, were active as the first Hebrew typographers. Six works are positively known to have come off their press, among which was the first, albeit undated edition of Rashi's commentary. Nonetheless, the 1475 edition Abraham Garton created and employed, for the first time, a typeface based on a Sephardic semicursive hand. It was this same style of typeface that a few years later, when commentary and text were incorporated onto one page, would be used to distinguish Rabbinic commentary from the text proper. Ultimately, this typeface would be known as Rashi script.
