= Vaybertaytsh =

Yiddish script typeface

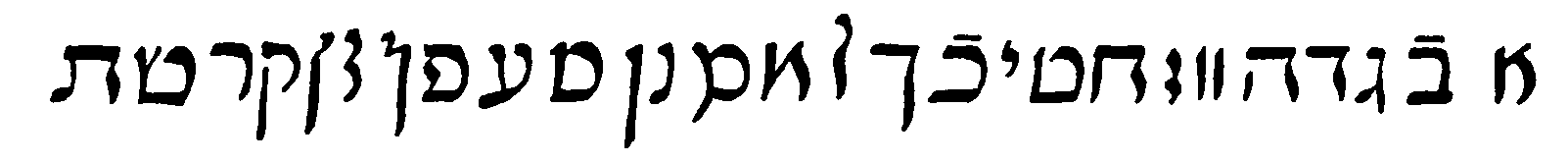
The Hebrew alphabet set in a "vaybertaytsh" type.

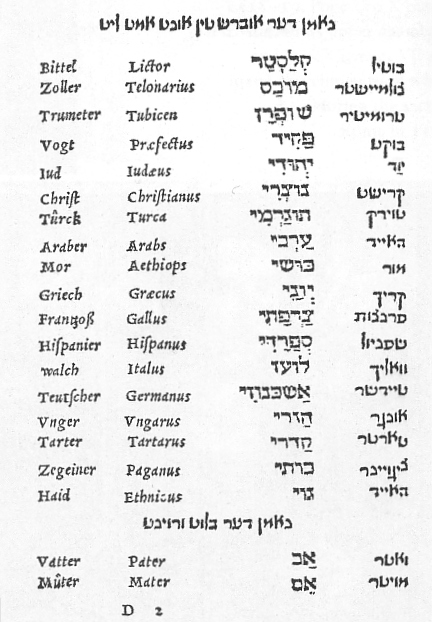
A page from Elia Levita's Yiddish-Hebrew-Latin-German dictionary (c. 1542). Vaybertaytsh is shown at the far right, Hebrew block print second to right, with Latin and German following.

Vaybertaytsh (Yiddish: װײַבערטײַטש, lit. 'women's taytsh', i.e. 'women's Yiddish') or mashket (Yiddish: מאַשקעט), (Note: Also known as Yiddish Type, mesheit (מעשייט), vaybershrift (װײַבערשריפֿט, lit. 'women's writing'), vayberksav (װײַבערכתב), tkhine ksav (תּחינה כתב), and tsene-urene ksav (צאנה־וראינה כתב).) is a semi-cursive script typeface for the Yiddish alphabet. From the 16th until the early 19th century, the mashket font distinguished Yiddish publications, whereas the Hebrew square script was used for classical texts in Hebrew and Aramaic, and the "Rashi" script for rabbinic commentaries and works in Ladino.

Mashket was used for printing Yiddish in the Old Yiddish literature period, and later as the primary script used in texts for and by Jewish women, ranging from folktales to women's supplications and prayers, to didactic works.

== Description ==
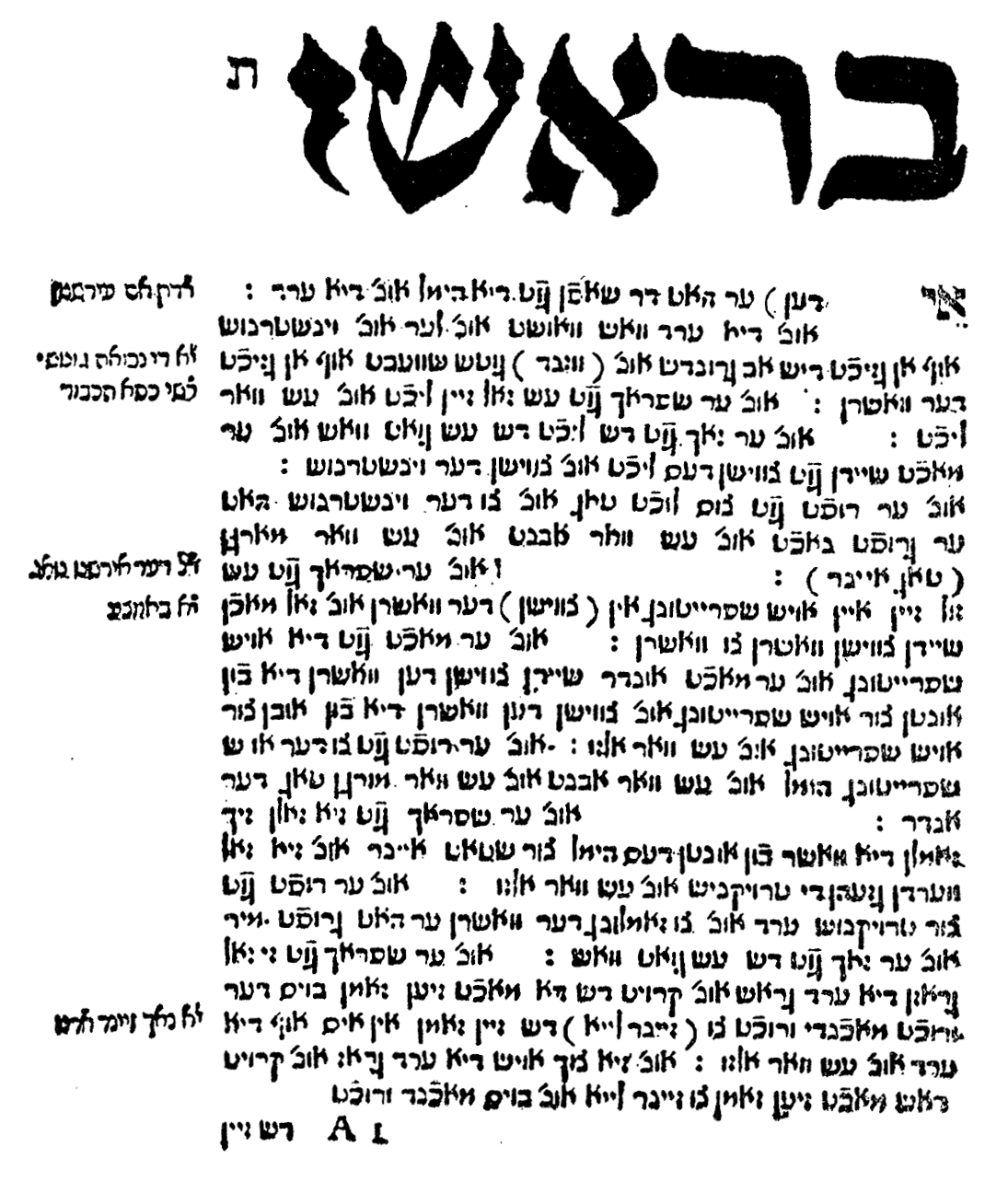
Writing in vaybertaytsh from the first page of the Konstanzer Chumash, the first Yiddish translation of the Chumash (c. 1544)

Unlike Yiddish block or square print (the script used in modern Hebrew, with the addition of special characters and diacritics), vaybertaytsh is a semi-cursive script, akin to the "Rashi" script. Vaybertaytsh may be handwritten or typed.

== History ==
Mashket originated as a typeface imitating the Ashkenazic semi-cursive used for both Hebrew and Yiddish. The earliest extant printed book in which Yiddish constituted a major segment, The Second Chariot (Hebrew: מרכבת המשנה) (1534), attributed to Rabbi Anshel ben Eliakim ha-Levi Tsion, was written in mashket. The type family came to be used almost exclusively for Yiddish with the dominance use of block and "Rashi" scripts (the latter based on Sephardic semi-cursive) by early Hebrew typographers such as the Soncino family.

The typeface later became associated with devotional women's literature. As a result of their not being present in the yeshivot, women were usually fluent only in the Yiddish (the vernacular among Ashkenazi Jews), and literate only in Yiddish, if at all. Thus early religious works in Yiddish were mostly created for women's edification. The Tseno Ureno was a Yiddish-language prose adaptation of the Chumash, its corresponding Haftarah portions, and the Megillot. It dates to at least 1622 and has been published in block print and vaybertaytsh. Similarly, tkhines were supplicatory prayers written in Yiddish (usually for women) rather than in Hebrew and Aramaic, in contrast to the normative Jewish liturgy. They proliferated in the 16th and 17th centuries, and continued to be written and published, usually in vaybertaytsh, into the early- to mid-20th century.

Square print began to replace vaybertaytsh in Yiddish books in the 1830s. By the late 19th century, nearly all books in Yiddish were printed in square letters.

== See also ==
- Rashi script
- Tkhine
- Tseno Ureno
- Joseph Athias
- Yiddish literature
