= Zayin =

Seventh letter of many Semitic alphabets

← Waw Zayin Heth →
- Phoenician: 𐤆
- Hebrew: ז
- Samaritan: ࠆ
- Aramaic: 𐡆
- Syriac: ܙ
- Nabataean: 𐢉
- Arabic: ز
- South Arabian: 𐩸
- Geʽez: ዘ
- North Arabian: 𐪘
- Ugaritic: 𐎇
- Phonemic representation: z
- Position in alphabet: 7
- Numerical value: 7

Alphabetic derivatives of the Phoenician
- Greek: Ζ
- Latin: Z, ẞ
- Cyrillic: З, Ж

Zayin (also spelled zain or zayn or simply zay) is the seventh letter of the Semitic abjads, including Phoenician zayn 𐤆, Hebrew zayīn ז, Aramaic zain 𐡆, Syriac zayn ܙ, and Arabic zāy ز. It represents the sound [z]. It is also related to the Ancient North Arabian 𐪘, South Arabian 𐩸, and Ge'ez ዘ.‌ The Phoenician letter gave rise to the Greek zeta (Ζ), Etruscan z, Latin Z, and Cyrillic Ze З, as well as Ж.

== Origin ==
The Proto-Sinaitic glyph may have been called ziqq, may not have been based on a hieroglyph, and may have depicted a "fetter".

An alternative view is that it is based on the "copper ingot" hieroglyph (𓈔) in the form of an axeblade, after noting that the name "zayin" has roots in Aramaic to refer to "Arms," "Armor," and "Metal used for arms."

The Phoenician letter appears to be named after a sword or other weapon. In Hebrew, zayin (זין) means "weapon", the verb lĕzayyēn (לזיין) means "to arm", and the verb lĕhizdayyēn (להזדיין) means "to arm oneself".

== Arabic zāy ==
Zāy زاي
- ز

Usage
- Writing system: Arabic script
- Type: Abjad
- Language of origin: Arabic language
- Sound values: z
- Alphabetical position: 11

History
- Development: 𐤆: 𐡆; 𐢉; ر; ز

Other
- Writing direction: Right-to-left

The letter is named zāy. It has two forms, depending on its position in the word:

Position in word:	Isolated	Final	Medial	Initial
Glyph form: (Help)	ز	ـز	ـز	ز

The similarity to rāʼ ر is likely a function of the original Syriac forms converging to a single symbol, requiring that one of them be distinguished as a dot; a similar process occurred to jīm and ḥāʼ. In Maltese, the corresponding letter to ز is ż.

=== Variant ===
A variant letter of zāy named že is used in Persian with three dots above instead of just one dot above. The letter is used in a number of languages, such as Persian, Pashto, Kurdish, Urdu and Uyghur (see K̡ona Yezik̡).

Position in word:	Isolated	Final	Medial	Initial
Glyph form: (Help)	ژ	ـژ	ـژ	ژ

== Hebrew zayin ==
Orthographic variants
Various print fonts			Cursive Hebrew	Solitreo	Rashi script
Serif	Sans-serif	Monospaced	Cursive Hebrew	Solitreo	Rashi script
ז	ז	ז			

In modern Hebrew, the frequency of the usage of zayin, out of all the letters, is 0.88%.

Hebrew spelling: זַיִן

In modern Hebrew, the combination ז׳ (zayin followed by a geresh) is used in loanwords and foreign names to denote [ʒ] as in vision.

=== Significance ===
==== Numerical value (gematria) ====
Shabbat, the receiver, is the letter Zayin that has two heads – which represents both love and fear

— Maggid of Mezeritch

In gematria, zayin represents the number seven, and when used at the beginning of Hebrew years it means 7000 (i.e. זתשנד in numbers would be the future date 7754).

==== Use in Torah scroll ====
Zayin, in addition to ʻayin, gimel, teth, nun, shin, and tzadi, is one of the seven letters which receive a special crown (called a tagin) when written in a Sefer Torah (Torah scroll).

== Syriac zain ==
Zain is a consonant with the /z/ sound which is a voiced alveolar fricative.

Position in word:	Isolated	Final	Medial	Initial
Glyph form: (Help)	ܙ	ـܙ	ـܙـ	ܙـ

== Character encodings ==
Character information
Preview	ז		ز		ܙ		ࠆ	
Unicode name	HEBREW LETTER ZAYIN		ARABIC LETTER ZAIN		SYRIAC LETTER ZAIN		SAMARITAN LETTER ZEN	
Encodings	decimal	hex	dec	hex	dec	hex	dec	hex
Unicode	1494	U+05D6	1586	U+0632	1817	U+0719	2054	U+0806
UTF-8	215 150	D7 96	216 178	D8 B2	220 153	DC 99	224 160 134	E0 A0 86
Numeric character reference	&#1494;	&#x5D6;	&#1586;	&#x632;	&#1817;	&#x719;	&#2054;	&#x806;

Character information
Preview	𐎇		𐡆		𐤆	
Unicode name	UGARITIC LETTER ZETA		IMPERIAL ARAMAIC LETTER ZAYIN		PHOENICIAN LETTER ZAI	
Encodings	decimal	hex	dec	hex	dec	hex
Unicode	66439	U+10387	67654	U+10846	67846	U+10906
UTF-8	240 144 142 135	F0 90 8E 87	240 144 161 134	F0 90 A1 86	240 144 164 134	F0 90 A4 86
UTF-16	55296 57223	D800 DF87	55298 56390	D802 DC46	55298 56582	D802 DD06
Numeric character reference	&#66439;	&#x10387;	&#67654;	&#x10846;	&#67846;	&#x10906;

== See also ==
- ژ - že
