= Rashi script =

Semi-cursive Hebrew typeface used for traditional commentaries

Complete Hebrew alphabet in Rashi script (right to left)

The Rashi script or Sephardic script (Hebrew: כְּתַב רַשִׁ״י, romanized: Ktav Rashi) is a typeface for the Hebrew alphabet based on 15th-century Sephardic semi-cursive handwriting. It is named for the rabbinic commentator Rashi, whose works are customarily printed in the typeface (though Rashi himself died several hundred years before the script came into use). It was taken as a model by early Hebrew typographers such as Abraham Garton, the Soncino family and Daniel Bomberg in their editions of commented texts (such as the Mikraot Gedolot and the Talmud, in which Rashi's commentaries prominently figure).

== History ==
The initial development of typefaces for the printing press was often anchored in a pre-existing manuscript culture. In the case of the Hebrew press, the tradition of using square or block letters for Biblical and other important works prevailed. However, secondary religious texts such as rabbinic commentaries, were commonly set with a semi-cursive form of Sephardic origin, ultimately normalised as the Rashi typeface.

A corresponding but distinctive semi-cursive typeface was used for printing Yiddish. It was termed mashket or vaybertaytsh, the Yiddish word vayber meaning "women" (Weiber) and taytsh being an archaic word for "German" (Deutsch), since works printed in mashket were often intended for a female readership.

== Comparison with square Hebrew ==
Hebrew letters in Rashi and square type
א =	ב =	ג =	ד =	ה =	ו =	ז =	ח =	ט =
י =	כ =	ך =	ל =	מ =	ם =	נ =	ן =	ס =
ע =	פ =	ף =	צ =	ץ =	ק =	ר =	ש =	ת =

== Ladino usage ==
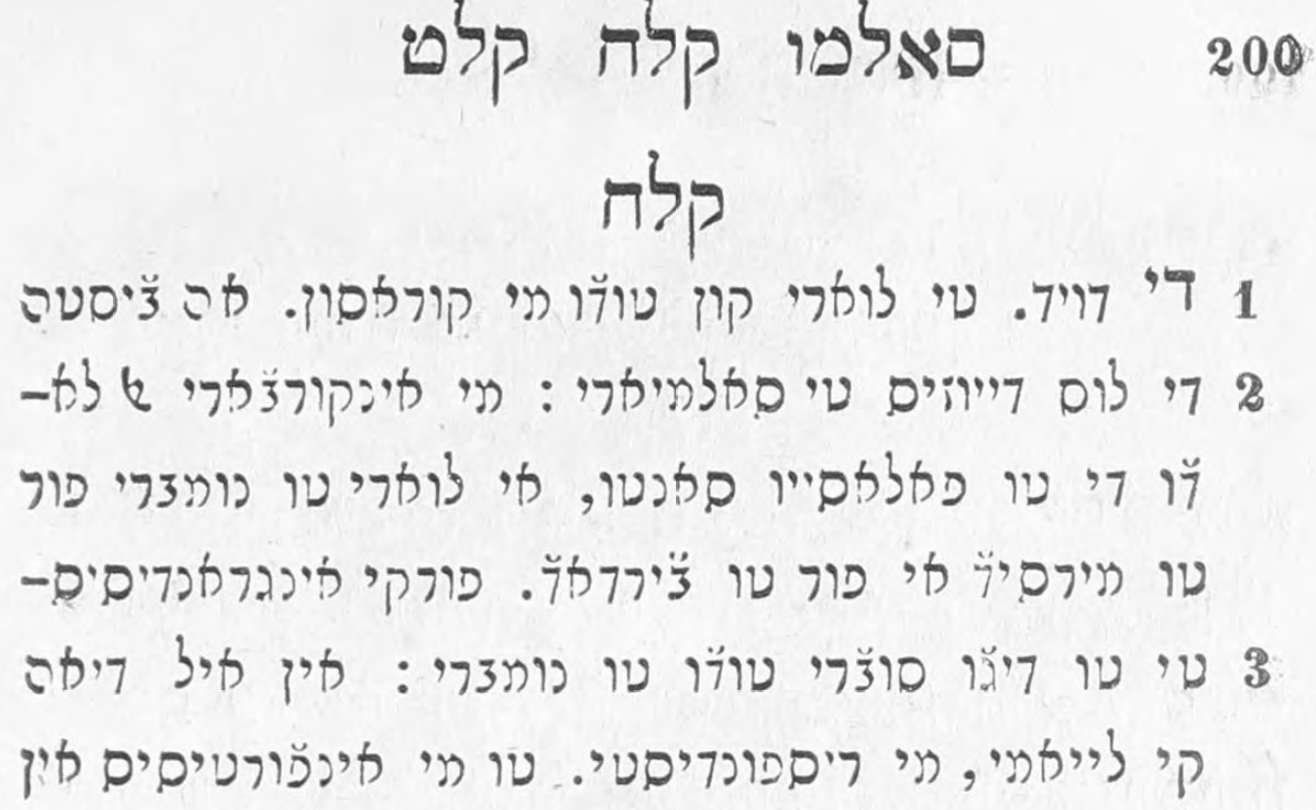
Example of text written in Rashi script from a 19th century print of Psalm 138 in Ladino language; additional letters representing distinct Ladino phonemes can be seen, modified by the curved varrica rafe diacritic placed atop a letter (titles/headings are in block print).

Besides usage for the Hebrew language, an adapted form of Rashi script alphabet is commonly used for writing Ladino language texts in the Hebrew alphabet. To express additional fricative sounds found in Ladino, the alphabet is expanded by adding diacritic marks to existing letters. Whereas in block print a Hebrew letter is typically modified by an adjacent geresh, in the Rashi script, new letters are formed by adding a breve-shaped varrica ("little crossbar") rafe diacritic ⟨ﬞ◌⟩ directly onto a letter. Historically, a cursive script known as "solitreo" served as the standard handwritten form of Ladino in the Balkans and Turkey, which complemented the Rashi script character set used for printing.

Ladino letters formed using a 'varrica' rafe
Without Rafe				With Rafe (equivalent with geresh)			
Symbol	Translit.	IPA	Example	Symbol	Translit.	IPA	Example
ב	b	[b]	boy	(ב׳) בﬞ	v	[v]~[β̞]	voyage
ג	g	[ɡ]	gap	(ג׳) גﬞ	dj, ǧ, or ch, č	[d͡ʒ]~[t͡ʃ]	Jupiter, George, chip
ד	d	[d̪]	day	(ד׳) דﬞ	dh, th, ḏ, đ	[ð̞]	they
ז	z	[z]	zoo	(ז׳) זﬞ	j, g, zh, ž	[ʒ]	Jacques, beige, vision
ט	t	[t̪]	toy	(ט׳) טﬞ	th	[θ]	thirty
כ	c, k	[k]	care, king	(כ׳) כﬞ	ch, kh, ḵ	[x]~[χ]	loch, Bach
פ	p	[p]	past	(פ׳) פﬞ	f	[f]	fast
ש	s, ç	[s]	sin, cent	(ש׳) שﬞ	sh, š	[ʃ]	shin
