= Lamedh =

Twelfth letter of many Semitic alphabets

← Kaph Lamedh Mem →
- Phoenician: 𐤋
- Hebrew: ל
- Samaritan: ࠋ
- Aramaic: 𐡋
- Syriac: ܠ
- Nabataean: 𐢑𐢐
- Arabic: ل
- South Arabian: 𐩡
- Geʽez: ለ
- North Arabian: 𐪁
- Ugaritic: 𐎍
- Phonemic representation: l, (ɫ)
- Position in alphabet: 12
- Numerical value: 30

Alphabetic derivatives of the Phoenician
- Greek: Λ
- Latin: L
- Cyrillic: Л

Lamedh or lamed is the twelfth letter of the Semitic abjads, including Hebrew lāmeḏ ל, Aramaic lāmaḏ 𐡋, Syriac lāmaḏ ܠ, Arabic lām ل, and Phoenician lāmd 𐤋. Its sound value is [l]. It is also related to the Ancient North Arabian 𐪁, South Arabian 𐩡, and Ge'ez ለ.

The Phoenician letter gave rise to the Greek Lambda (Λ), Latin L, and Cyrillic El (Л).

== Origin ==
The letter is usually considered to have originated from the representation of an ox-goad, i.e. a cattle prod, or a shepherd's crook, i.e. a pastoral staff. In Proto-Semitic a goad was called *lamed-.

== Arabic lām ==
Lām لام
- ل

Usage
- Writing system: Arabic script
- Type: Abjad
- Language of origin: Arabic language
- Sound values: l (ɫ)
- Alphabetical position: 23

History
- Development: 𐤋; 𐡋; 𐢐, 𐢑

Other
- Writing direction: Right-to-left

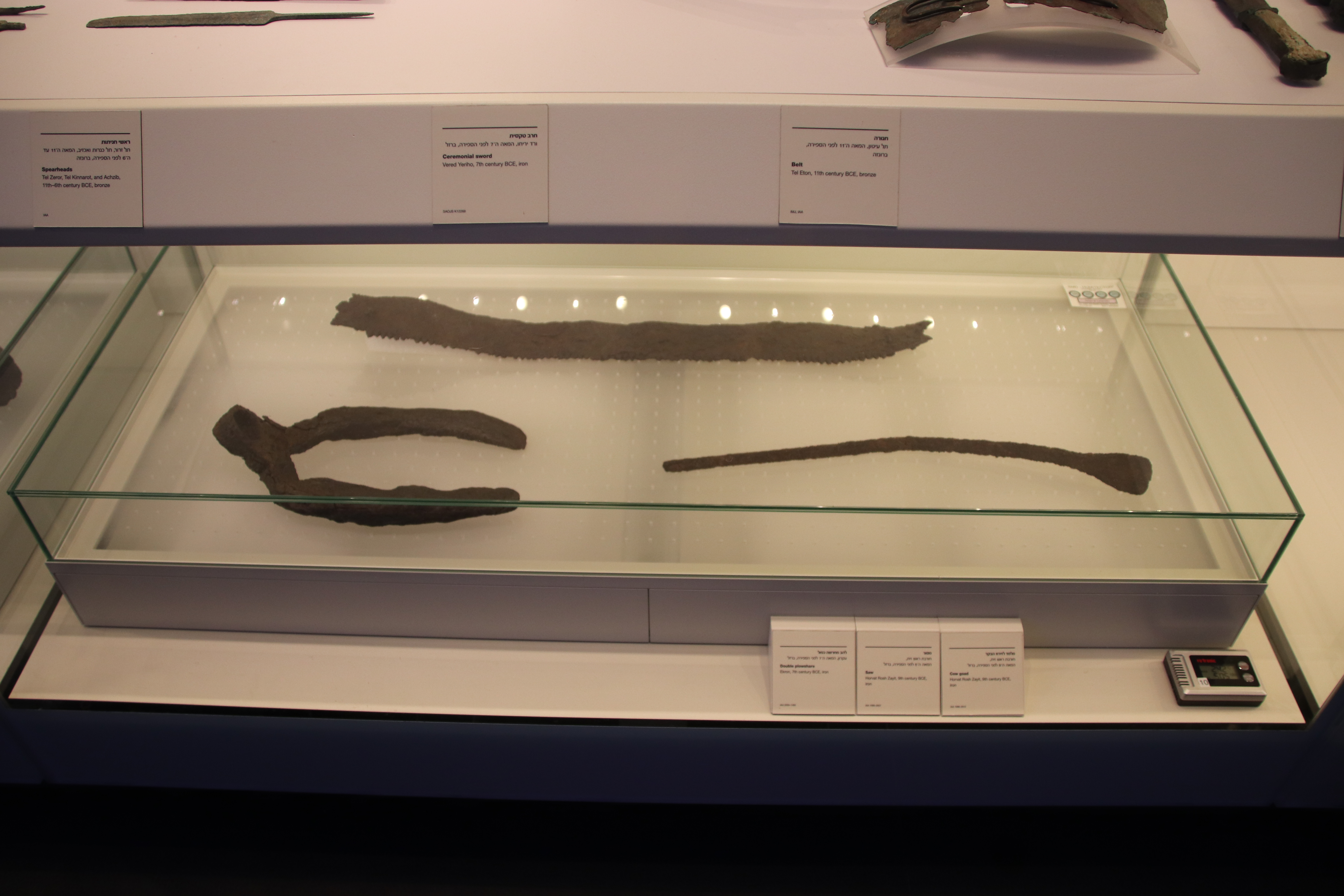
An iron cow-goad in the Israel Museum (lower right, 9th-7th century BC)

The letter is named لام lām /laːm/.

=== Orthography ===
Its form depends on its position in the word:

Position in word:	Isolated	Final	Medial	Initial
Glyph form: (Help)	ل	ـل	ـلـ	لـ

=== Grammatical functions ===
Lām has functions as a grammatical particle when used as a prefix:

- Prepositional lām (لام جارة)
- Lām of ownership (لام المُلك)
- Lām of association (لام الاختصاص)
- Lām of purpose (لام التعليل)
- Lām of absolute negation (لام الجحود)
- Imperative lām (لام الأمر)
- Lām of affirmative emphasis (لام التوكيد)

Lām-kasra (لـِ, /li/) is essentially a preposition meaning 'to' or 'for', as in لِوالدي liwālidī, 'for my father'. In this usage, it has become concatenated with other words to form new constructions often treated as independent words: for instance, لِماذا limāḏā, meaning 'why?', is derived from لـِ li and ماذا māḏā, meaning 'what?' thus getting 'for what?'. A semantically equivalent construction is found in most Romance languages, e.g. French pourquoi, Spanish por qué, and Italian perché (though ché is an archaism and not in current use).

The other construction, lām-fatḥa (لَـ /la/) is used as an emphatic particle in very formal Arabic and in certain fixed constructions, such as لَقد laqad (itself an emphatic particle for past-tense verbs) and in the conditional structure لو...لَـ law...la, effectively one of the forms of 'if...then...'.

== Hebrew lamed ==
Orthographic variants
Various print fonts			Cursive Hebrew	Solitreo	Rashi script
Serif	Sans-serif	Monospaced	Cursive Hebrew	Solitreo	Rashi script
ל	ל	ל			

Hebrew spelling: לָמֶד

=== Pronunciation ===
Lamed transcribes as an alveolar lateral approximant /l/.

=== Significance ===
Lamed in gematria represents the number 30.

With the letter Vav it refers to the Lamedvavniks, the 36 righteous people who save the world from destruction.

As an abbreviation, it can stand for litre. Also, a sign on a car with a Lamed on it means that the driver is a student of driving (the Lamed stands for lomed, learner). It is also used as the Electoral symbol for the Yisrael Beiteinu party.

As a prefix, it can have two purposes:

- It can be attached to verb roots, designating the infinitive (Daber means "speak", Ledaber means to speak).
- It can also act as a preposition meaning "to" or "for".

== Syriac lamadh ==
Position in word:	Isolated	Final	Medial	Initial
Glyph form: (Help)	ܠ	ـܠ	ـܠـ	ܠـ

== Character encodings ==
Character information
Preview	ל		ل		ܠ		ࠋ	
Unicode name	HEBREW LETTER LAMED		ARABIC LETTER LAM		SYRIAC LETTER LAMADH		SAMARITAN LETTER LABAT	
Encodings	decimal	hex	dec	hex	dec	hex	dec	hex
Unicode	1500	U+05DC	1604	U+0644	1824	U+0720	2059	U+080B
UTF-8	215 156	D7 9C	217 132	D9 84	220 160	DC A0	224 160 139	E0 A0 8B
Numeric character reference	&#1500;	&#x5DC;	&#1604;	&#x644;	&#1824;	&#x720;	&#2059;	&#x80B;

Character information
Preview	𐎍		𐡋		𐤋	
Unicode name	UGARITIC LETTER LAMDA		IMPERIAL ARAMAIC LETTER LAMEDH		PHOENICIAN LETTER LEMDA	
Encodings	decimal	hex	dec	hex	dec	hex
Unicode	66445	U+1038D	67659	U+1084B	67851	U+1090B
UTF-8	240 144 142 141	F0 90 8E 8D	240 144 161 139	F0 90 A1 8B	240 144 164 139	F0 90 A4 8B
UTF-16	55296 57229	D800 DF8D	55298 56395	D802 DC4B	55298 56587	D802 DD0B
Numeric character reference	&#66445;	&#x1038D;	&#67659;	&#x1084B;	&#67851;	&#x1090B;

Variants:

- U+08A6 ࢦ ARABIC LETTER LAM WITH DOUBLE BAR
