= Tsade =

Eighteenth letter of the Semitic scripts

← Pe Tsade Qoph →
- Phoenician: 𐤑
- Hebrew: צץ
- Samaritan: ࠑ
- Aramaic: 𐡑
- Syriac: ܨ
- Nabataean: 𐢙
- Arabic: ص
- South Arabian: 𐩮
- Geʽez: ጸ
- North Arabian: 𐪎
- Ugaritic: 𐎕
- Phonemic representation: sˤ (t͡s)
- Position in alphabet: 18
- Numerical value: 90

Alphabetic derivatives of the Phoenician
- Greek: Ϻ, Ψ, Ϡ
- Cyrillic: Ц, Ч, Џ, Ѱ

Tsade (also spelled ṣade, ṣādē, ṣaddi, ṣad, tzadi, sadhe, tzaddik) is the eighteenth letter of the Semitic abjads, including Phoenician ṣādē 𐤑, Hebrew ṣāḏē צ, Aramaic ṣāḏē 𐡑, Syriac ṣāḏē ܨ, Ge'ez ṣädäy ጸ, and Arabic ṣād ص. It is related to the Ancient North Arabian 𐪎, South Arabian 𐩮, and Ge'ez ጸ. The corresponding letter of the Ugaritic alphabet is 𐎕 ṣade.

Its oldest phonetic value is debated, although there is a variety of pronunciations in different modern Semitic languages and their dialects. It represents the coalescence of three Proto-Semitic "emphatic consonants" in Canaanite. Arabic, which kept the phonemes separate, introduced variants of ṣād and ṭāʾ to express the three (see ḍād, ẓāʾ). In Aramaic, these emphatic consonants coalesced instead with ʿayin and ṭēt, respectively, thus Hebrew ereṣ ארץ (earth) is araʿ ארע in Aramaic.

The Phoenician letter is continued in the Greek san (Ϻ) and possibly sampi (Ϡ), and in Etruscan 𐌑 Ś. It may have inspired the form of the letter tse in the Glagolitic and Cyrillic alphabets.

The letter is named "tsadek" in Yiddish, and Hebrew speakers often give it a similar name as well. This name for the letter probably originated from a fast recitation of the alphabet (i.e., "tsadi, qoph" → "tsadiq, qoph"), influenced by the Hebrew word tzadik, meaning "righteous person".

== Origins ==
The origin of ṣade is unclear. It may have come from a Proto-Sinaitic script based on a pictogram of a plant, perhaps a papyrus plant, or a fish hook (Modern Hebrew צד tsad and Arabic صاد ṣād both can mean "[he] hunted" or, alternatively, "a side").

== Arabic ṣād ==
Ṣād صاد
- ص

Usage
- Writing system: Arabic script
- Type: Abjad
- Language of origin: Arabic language
- Sound values: sˤ
- Alphabetical position: 14

History
- Development: 𐤑: 𐡑; 𐢙; ص
- Transliterations: ṣ

Other
- Writing direction: Right-to-left

The letter is named ṣād and in Modern Standard Arabic is pronounced /sˤ/. It may be formed from a ligature of dotless nūn and the bottom part of the letter ṭa.

It is written in several ways depending on its position in the word:

Position in word:	Isolated	Final	Medial	Initial
Glyph form: (Help)	ص	ـص	ـصـ	صـ

Chapter 38 of the Quran is named for this letter, which begins the chapter.

The phoneme is not native to Persian, Ottoman Turkish, or Urdu, and its pronunciation in Arabic loanwords in those languages is not distinguishable from س /s/ or ث /θ/, all of which are pronounced [s].

== Hebrew tsadi ==
Orthographic variants
position in word	Various print fonts			Modern Cursive Hebrew	Solitreo	Rashi script
position in word	Serif	Sans-serif	Monospaced	Modern Cursive Hebrew	Solitreo	Rashi script
non-final	צ	צ	צ			
final	ץ	ץ	ץ			

Hebrew spelling: צָדִי or צָדֵי.

=== Name ===
In Hebrew, the letter's name is tsadi or ṣadi, depending on whether the letter is transliterated as Modern Israeli "ts" or Tiberian "ṣ". Alternatively, it can be called tsadik or ṣadik, spelled צָדִּיק, influenced by its Yiddish name tsadek and the Hebrew word tzadik.

=== Variations ===
Ṣadi, like kaph, mem, pe, and nun, has a final form, used at the end of words. Its shape changes from צ to ץ.

=== Pronunciation ===
In Modern Hebrew, צ tsade represents a voiceless alveolar affricate /t͡s/. This is the same in Yiddish. Historically, it represented either a pharyngealized /sˤ/ or an affricate such as the Modern Hebrew pronunciation or Geʽez [t͡sʼ]; which became [t͡s] in Ashkenazi Hebrew. A geresh can also be placed after tsade (צ׳ ; ץ׳), which is pronounced [t͡ʃ], e.g. צִ׳יפְּס chips.

Ṣade appears as [sˤ] in Yemenite Hebrew and other Jews from the Middle East, and sometimes appears in the Modern Hebrew pronunciation of Yemenite Jews.

Sephardi Hebrew pronounces צ like a regular s, and this is the sound value it has in Judaeo-Spanish, as in "masa" (matzo) or "sadik" (tzadik), and rarely appears in this form in the Modern Hebrew pronunciation of Sephardic Jews.

=== Significance ===
In gematria, ṣadi represents the number 90. Its final form represents 900, but this is rarely used, taw, taw, and qof (400+400+100) being used instead.

As an abbreviation, it stands for ṣafon, north.

Ṣadi is also one of the seven letters that receive special crowns (called tagin) when written in a Sefer Torah. See shin, ‘ayin, tet, nun, zayin, and gimmel.

=== In relation with Arabic ===
Hebrew צ tsadi corresponds to the letters ظ ẓāʾ, ص ṣād, and ض ḍād in Arabic

Examples

- ظ ẓāʾ: the word for "thirst" in Classical Arabic is ظمأ ẓamaʾ and צמא tsama in Hebrew.
- ص ṣād: the word for "Egypt" in Classical Arabic is مصر miṣr and מצרים mitsrayim in Hebrew.
- ض ḍād: the word for "egg" in Classical Arabic is بيضة bayḍah and ביצה betsah in Hebrew.

When representing this sound in transliteration of Arabic into Hebrew, it is written as צ tsade or ס׳ samekh with a geresh.

== Syriac sade ==
Position in word:	Isolated	Final	Medial	Initial
Glyph form: (Help)	ܨ	ـܨ	ـܨـ	ܨـ

== Character encodings ==
Character information
Preview	צ		ץ		ص		ܨ		ࠑ	
Unicode name	HEBREW LETTER TSADI		HEBREW LETTER FINAL TSADI		ARABIC LETTER SAD		SYRIAC LETTER SADHE		SAMARITAN LETTER TSAADIY	
Encodings	decimal	hex	dec	hex	dec	hex	dec	hex	dec	hex
Unicode	1510	U+05E6	1509	U+05E5	1589	U+0635	1832	U+0728	2065	U+0811
UTF-8	215 166	D7 A6	215 165	D7 A5	216 181	D8 B5	220 168	DC A8	224 160 145	E0 A0 91
Numeric character reference	&#1510;	&#x5E6;	&#1509;	&#x5E5;	&#1589;	&#x635;	&#1832;	&#x728;	&#2065;	&#x811;

Character information
Preview	𐎕		𐡑		𐤑	
Unicode name	UGARITIC LETTER SADE		IMPERIAL ARAMAIC LETTER SADHE		PHOENICIAN LETTER SADE	
Encodings	decimal	hex	dec	hex	dec	hex
Unicode	66453	U+10395	67665	U+10851	67857	U+10911
UTF-8	240 144 142 149	F0 90 8E 95	240 144 161 145	F0 90 A1 91	240 144 164 145	F0 90 A4 91
UTF-16	55296 57237	D800 DF95	55298 56401	D802 DC51	55298 56593	D802 DD11
Numeric character reference	&#66453;	&#x10395;	&#67665;	&#x10851;	&#67857;	&#x10911;

== See also ==
- Ṣ
- Z
- Tse (Cyrillic)
