= Solitreo =

Cursive form of the Hebrew alphabet

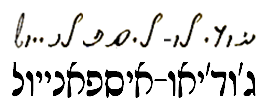
"Judeo-español" in Solitreo and Rashi scripts

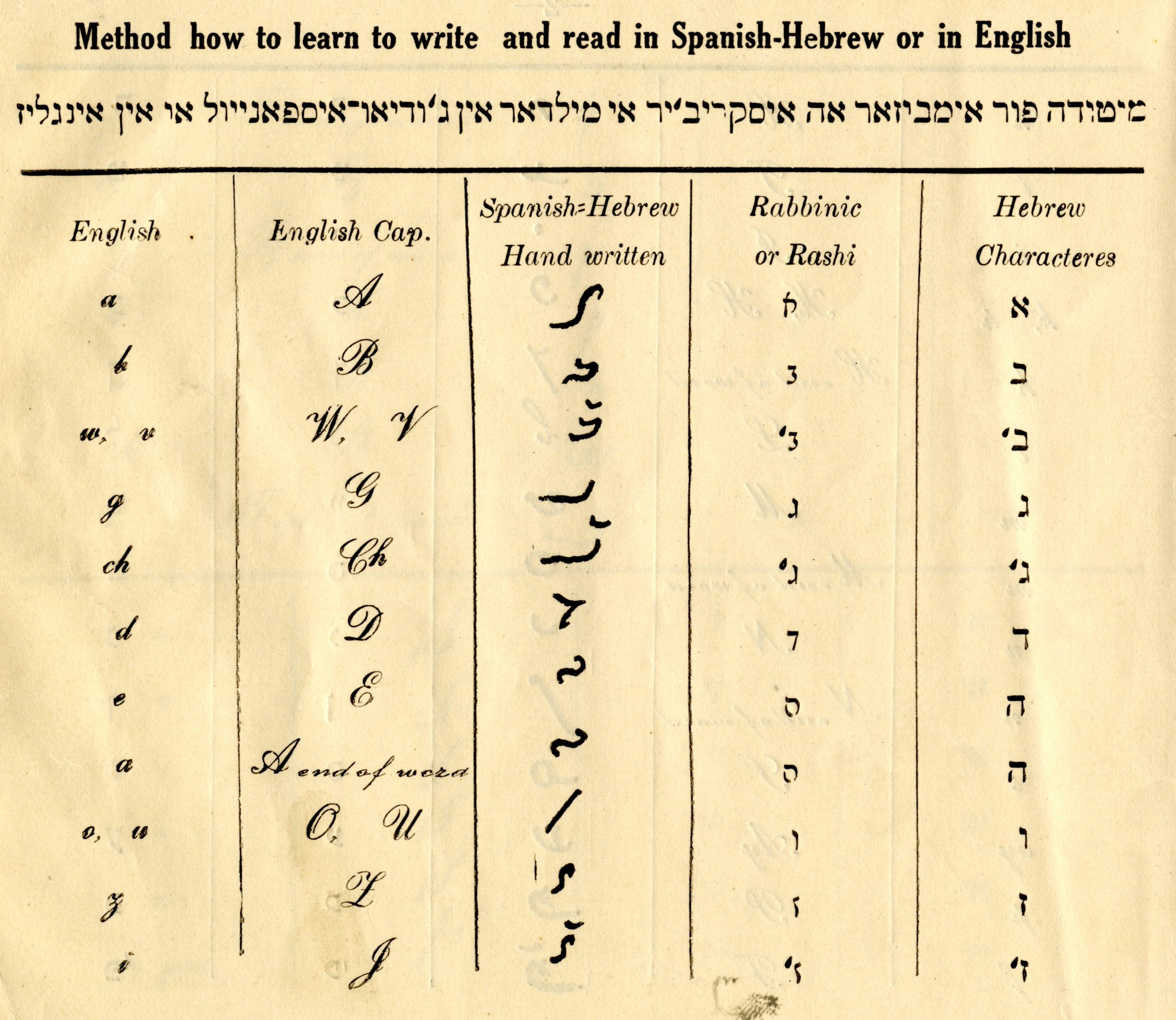
Comparison of Solitreo, Rashi and block scripts

Solitreo (Hebrew: סוליטריאו ,סוֹלִיטְרֵיוֹ) is a cursive form of the Hebrew alphabet. It is a Sephardi script, quite different from the Ashkenazi cursive Hebrew currently used for Hebrew handwriting in modern Israel and for Yiddish. The two cursive Hebrew script forms differ from each other in many ways, including in that Solitreo uses far more typographic ligatures than the Modern Hebrew script.

Historically, Solitreo served as the standard handwritten form of Judeo-Spanish in the Balkans and Turkey, that complemented the Rashi script character set used for printing. In Sephardi communities in the Maghreb and the Levant, it was used for Hebrew and Judeo-Arabic manuscripts. While both the Balkan and Maghrebine-Levantine forms are called Solitreo, they are quite distinctive and readers familiar with one type may find the other difficult to read.

With the decline of Judaeo-Spanish and the dispersion of Sephardic population centres, examples of Solitreo have become scarce. The February 2012 digitization of a Jewish merchant's memoir from late 19th century Thessaloniki, Ottoman Empire by scholars from Stanford University provided a new, high-quality resource for scholars of Judaeo-Spanish and Solitreo.

== Comparison with square Hebrew ==
Hebrew letters in Solitreo and square type
א = alef	ב = bet	ג = gimel	ד = dalet	ה = hei	ו = vav	ז = zayin	ח = ḥet	ט = ṭet
י = yud	כ = kaf	ך = kaf sofit	ל = lamed	מ = mem	ם = mem sofit	נ = nun	ן = nun sofit	ס = samekh
ע = ayin	פ = pei	ף = pe sofit	צ = tsadi	ץ = tsadi sofit	ק = quf	ר = resh	ש = shin	ת = tav

Letters in Solitreo and Rashi script
=	=	=	=	=	=	=	=	=
=	=	=	=	=	=	=	=	=
=	=	=	=	=	=	=	=	=
