= Pe (Semitic letter) =

Seventeenth letter of the Semitic scripts

← Ayin Pe Tsade →
- Phoenician: 𐤐
- Hebrew: פף
- Samaritan: ࠐ
- Aramaic: 𐡐
- Syriac: ܦ
- Nabataean: 𐢘
- Arabic: ف
- South Arabian: 𐩰
- Geʽez: ፈ
- North Arabian: 𐪐
- Ugaritic: 𐎔
- Phonemic representation: p, f (originally ɸ), w
- Position in alphabet: 17
- Numerical value: 80

Alphabetic derivatives of the Phoenician
- Greek: Π
- Latin: P
- Cyrillic: П

Pe is the seventeenth letter of the Semitic abjads, including Arabic fāʾ ف, Aramaic pē 𐡐, Hebrew pē פ, Phoenician pē 𐤐, and Syriac pē ܦ. (in abjadi order). It is related to the Ancient North Arabian 𐪐, South Arabian 𐩰, and Ge'ez ፈ.

The original sound value is a voiceless bilabial plosive /p/ and it retains this value in most Semitic languages, except for Arabic, where the sound /p/ changed into the voiceless labiodental fricative /f/, carrying with it the pronunciation of the letter. However, the sound /p/ in Arabic is used in loanwords with the letter pe as an alternative. Under the Persian influence, many Arabic dialects in the Persian Gulf, as well as in Egypt and in some of the Maghreb under the Ottoman influence uses the letter pe to represent the sound /p/ which is missing in Modern Standard Arabic. Not to be confused with the Turned g. The Phoenician letter gave rise to the Greek Pi (Π), Latin P, Glagolitic Ⱂ, and Cyrillic П.

== Origins ==
Pe is usually assumed to come from a pictogram of a "mouth" (as in Hebrew פֶּה (pe), Arabic, فا fah).

D21

== Arabic fāʾ ==
Fāʾ فاء
- ف

Usage
- Writing system: Arabic script
- Type: Abjad
- Language of origin: Arabic language
- Sound values: f
- Alphabetical position: 20

History
- Development: 𐤐: 𐡐; 𐢘; ڡ; ف

Other
- Writing direction: Right-to-left

The letter ف is named فاء fāʾ /faːʔ/. It is written in several ways depending on its position in the word:

| Position in word: | Isolated | Final | Medial | Initial |
|---|---|---|---|---|
| Glyph form: (Help) | ف | ـف | ـفـ | فـ |

In the process of developing from Proto-Semitic, Proto-Semitic /p/ became Arabic /f/, and this is reflected in the use of the letter representing /p/ in other Semitic languages for /f/ in Arabic.

Examples on usage in Modern Standard Arabic:

- Fāʾ-fatḥah (فَـ /fa/) is a multi-function prefix most commonly equivalent to "so" or "so that." For example: نَكْتُب naktub ("we write") → فَنَكْتُب fanaktub ("so we write").

=== Maghrebi variant ===
In Maghrebi scripts, the i'ajami dot in fāʼ has traditionally been written underneath (ڢ). Once the prevalent style, it is now mostly used in countries of the Maghreb in ceremonial situations or for writing Qur'an, with the exception of Libya and Algeria, which adopted the Mashriqi form (dot above). When the letter is isolated or word-final, it may sometimes become unpointed.

The Maghrebi fāʼ
| Position in word: | Isolated | Final | Medial | Initial |
| Form of letter: | ڢ / ࢻ | ـڢ / ـࢻ | ـڢـ | ڢـ |

The Maghrebi alphabet, to write qāf (ق), a letter that resembles fā’ (ف) in the initial and medial forms is used, but it is really a qāf with a single dot (ڧ).

=== Central Asian variant ===
In the Arabic orthographies of Uyghur, Kazakh and Kyrgyz, the letter fā’ has a descender in the final and isolated positions, much like the Maghrebi version of qāf.

| Position in word: | Isolated | Final | Medial | Initial |
|---|---|---|---|---|
| Glyph form: (Help) | ڧ | ـڧ | ـڧـ | ڧـ |

Theoretically this shape could be approximated by using U+06A7 ڧ ARABIC LETTER QAF WITH DOT ABOVE, but in practice U+0641 ف ARABIC LETTER FEH is used in databases of these languages, and most commercial fonts for these languages give the codepoint of the usual Arabic fā’ a shape like ڧ.

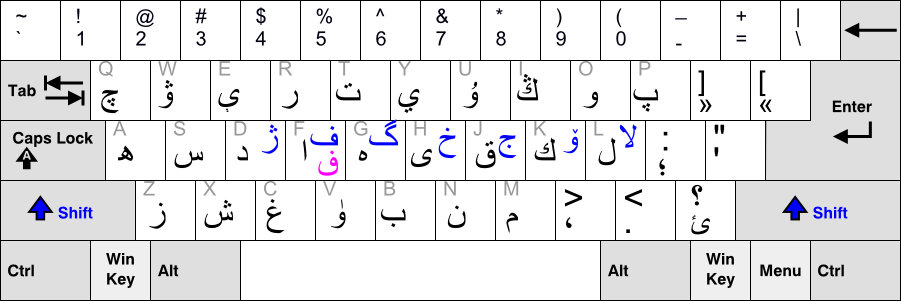
MS Windows Uyghur keyboard layout. On the key combination ⇧ Shift+F, U+06A7 ڧ ARABIC LETTER QAF WITH DOT ABOVE on the "Legacy" keyboard layout is shown in pink, and U+0641 ف ARABIC LETTER FEH on the latest keyboard is shown in blue.

When the Uyghur keyboard layout for Microsoft Windows was first added in Windows Vista and Windows Server 2008, the key combination ⇧ Shift+F resulted in U+06A7 ڧ ARABIC LETTER QAF WITH DOT ABOVE. The Uyghur keyboard layout in Windows 7 and Windows Server 2008 R2 changed that key combination to give U+0641 ف ARABIC LETTER FEH. On the newer systems, the old keyboard layout is still available under the name Uyghur (Legacy).

== Diacriticized Arabic versions ==
Normally, the letter ف fāʼ renders /f/ sound, but may also be used some names and loanwords where it can render /v/, might be arabized as /f/ in accordance to its spelling, e.g., يُونِيلِفِر (Unilever). It may be used interchangeably with the modified letter ڤ - ve (with 3 dots above) in this case. The letter fāʾ with three dots above is no longer used in Persian, as the [β]-sound changed to [b], e.g. archaic زڤان /zaβɑn/ > زبان /zæbɒn/ 'language'

The character is mapped in Unicode under position U+06A4.

| Position in word: | Isolated | Final | Medial | Initial |
|---|---|---|---|---|
| Glyph form: (Help) | ڤ | ـڤ | ـڤـ | ڤـ |

=== Maghrebi variant ===
The Maghrebi style, used in Northwestern Africa, the dots moved underneath (Unicode U+06A5), because it is based on the other style of fāʼ (ڢ):

| Position in word: | Isolated | Final | Medial | Initial |
|---|---|---|---|---|
| Glyph form: (Help) | ڥ | ـڥ | ـڥـ | ڥـ |

=== Other similar letters ===
| Code point | Isolated | Final | Medial | Initial | Unicode character name (or descriptive synonyms used in the JoiningType and JoiningGroup datatables) |
|---|---|---|---|---|---|
| U+0641 | ف | ـف | ـفـ | فـ |style="text-align:left"| ARABIC LETTER FEH | |
| U+06A1 | ڡ | ـڡ | ـڡـ | ڡـ |style="text-align:left"| ARABIC LETTER DOTLESS FEH | |
| U+06A2 | ڢ | ـڢ | ـڢـ | ڢـ |style="text-align:left"| ARABIC LETTER FEH WITH DOT MOVED BELOW  | |
| U+06A3 | ڣ | ـڣ | ـڣـ | ڣـ |style="text-align:left"| ARABIC LETTER FEH WITH DOT BELOW | |
| U+06A4 | ڤ | ـڤ | ـڤـ | ڤـ |style="text-align:left"| ARABIC LETTER FEH WITH 3 DOTS ABOVE = VEH | |
| U+06A5 | ڥ | ـڥ | ـڥـ | ڥـ |style="text-align:left"| ARABIC LETTER FEH WITH 3 DOTS BELOW = MAGHRIBI VEH | |
| U+06A6 | ڦ | ـڦ | ـڦـ | ڦـ |style="text-align:left"| ARABIC LETTER FEH WITH 4 DOTS ABOVE = PEHEH | |
| U+0760 | ݠ | ـݠ | ـݠـ | ݠـ |style="text-align:left"| ARABIC LETTER FEH WITH 2 DOTS BELOW | |
| U+0761 | ݡ | ـݡ | ـݡـ | ݡـ |style="text-align:left"| ARABIC LETTER FEH WITH 3 DOTS POINTING UPWARDS BELOW | |
| U+08A4 | ࢤ | ـࢤ | ـࢤـ | ࢤـ |style="text-align:left"| ARABIC LETTER FEH WITH DOT BELOW AND THREE DOTS ABOVE | |
| U+08BB | ࢻ | ـࢻ | ـࢻـ | ࢻـ |style="text-align:left"| ARABIC LETTER AFRICAN FEH | |

== Hebrew pe ==
The Hebrew spelling is פֵּא. It is also romanized pei or pey, especially when used in Yiddish.

Orthographic variants
| position in word | Various print fonts | | | Cursive Hebrew | Solitreo | Rashi script |
| position in word | Serif | Sans-serif | Monospaced | Cursive Hebrew | Solitreo | Rashi script |
|---|---|---|---|---|---|---|
| non final | פ | פ | פ | | | |
| final | ף | ף | ף | | | |

=== Variations on written form/pronunciation ===
The letter Pe is one of the six letters which can receive a Dagesh Kal. The six are Bet, Gimel, Daleth, Kaph, Pe, and Tav.

==== Variant forms of Pe/Fe ====
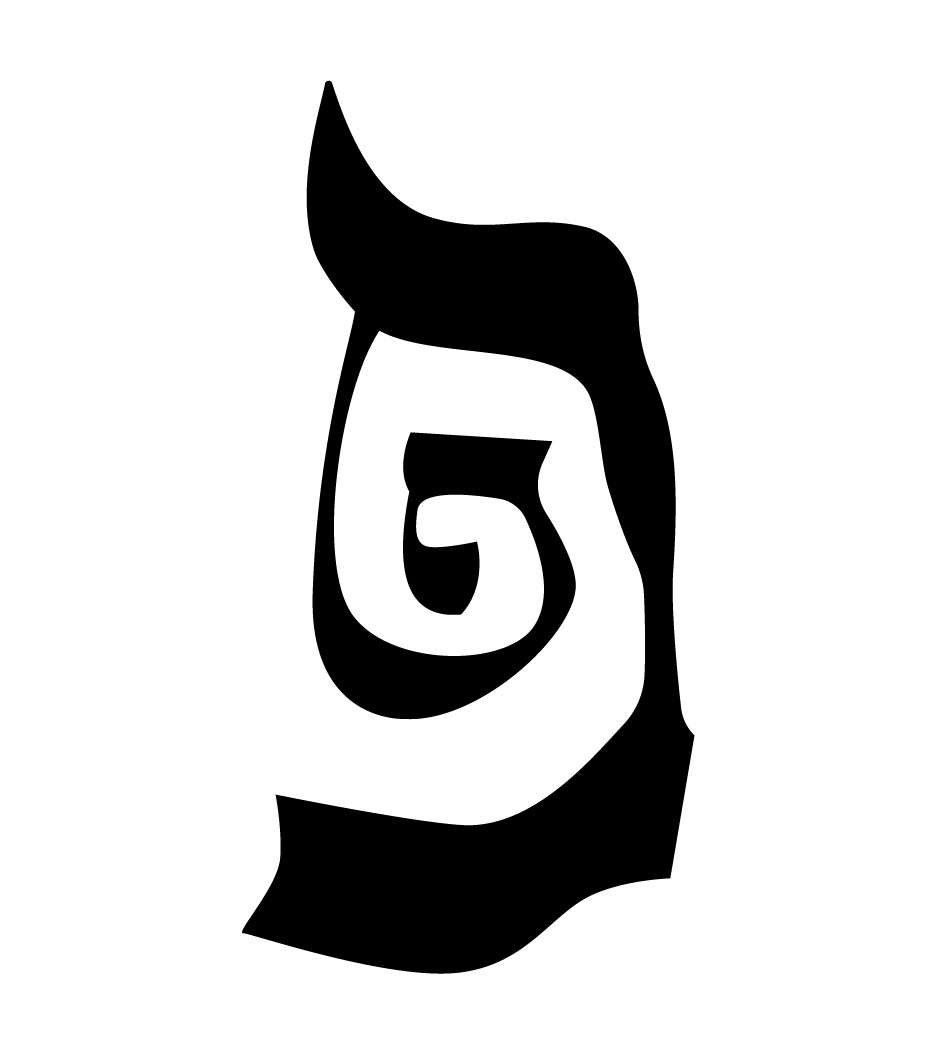
Pe Kefulah / Double Pe (Pe within a Pe)

A notable variation on the letter Pe is the Pe Kefulah (Doubled Pe), also known as the Pei Lefufah (Wrapped Pe). The Pe Kefulah is written as a small Pe scribed within a larger Pe. This atypical letter appears in Torah scrolls (most often Yemenite Torahs but is also present in Sephardic and Ashkenazi Torahs), manuscripts, and some modern printed Hebrew Bibles. When the Pe is written in the form of a Doubled Pe, this adds a layer of deeper meaning to the Biblical text. This letter variation can appear on the final and non-final forms of the Pe.

There are two orthographic variants of this letter which indicate a different pronunciation:

| Name | Symbol | IPA | Transliteration | as in the English word |
|---|---|---|---|---|
| Pe | פּ | /p/ | p | pan |
| Fe | פ | /f/ | f | fan |

==== Pe with the dagesh ====
When the Pe has a "dot" in its center, known as a dagesh, it represents a voiceless bilabial plosive, /p/. There are various rules in Hebrew grammar that stipulate when and why a dagesh is used.

==== Fe ====
When Pe appears without the dagesh dot in its center (פ), then it usually represents a voiceless labiodental fricative /f/.

==== Final form of Pe/Fe ====
At the end of words, the letter's written form changes to a Pe/Fe Sophit (Final Pe/Fe): ף.

When a word in modern Hebrew borrowed from another language ends with /p/, the non-final form is used (e.g. פִילִיפ /ˈfilip/ "Philip"), while borrowings ending in /f/ still use the Pe Sofit (e.g. כֵּיף /kef/ "fun", from Arabic). This is because native Hebrew words, which always use the final form at the end, cannot end in /p/.

=== Significance ===
In gematria, Pe represents the number 80. Its final form represents 800 but this is rarely used, Tav written twice (400+400) being used instead.

== Syriac pe ==
| Position in word: | Isolated | Final | Medial | Initial |
|---|---|---|---|---|
| Glyph form: (Help) | ܦ | ـܦ | ـܦـ | ܦـ |

== Character encodings ==
Character information
| Preview | פ | | ף | | ف | | ܦ | | ࠐ | |
|---|---|---|---|---|---|---|---|---|---|---|
| Unicode name | HEBREW LETTER PE | | HEBREW LETTER FINAL PE | | ARABIC LETTER FEH | | SYRIAC LETTER PE | | SAMARITAN LETTER PI | |
| Encodings | decimal | hex | dec | hex | dec | hex | dec | hex | dec | hex |
| Unicode | 1508 | U+05E4 | 1507 | U+05E3 | 1601 | U+0641 | 1830 | U+0726 | 2064 | U+0810 |
| UTF-8 | 215 164 | D7 A4 | 215 163 | D7 A3 | 217 129 | D9 81 | 220 166 | DC A6 | 224 160 144 | E0 A0 90 |
| Numeric character reference | &#1508; | &#x5E4; | &#1507; | &#x5E3; | &#1601; | &#x641; | &#1830; | &#x726; | &#2064; | &#x810; |

Character information
| Preview | 𐎔 | | 𐡐 | | 𐤐 | |
|---|---|---|---|---|---|---|
| Unicode name | UGARITIC LETTER PU | | IMPERIAL ARAMAIC LETTER PE | | PHOENICIAN LETTER PE | |
| Encodings | decimal | hex | dec | hex | dec | hex |
| Unicode | 66452 | U+10394 | 67664 | U+10850 | 67856 | U+10910 |
| UTF-8 | 240 144 142 148 | F0 90 8E 94 | 240 144 161 144 | F0 90 A1 90 | 240 144 164 144 | F0 90 A4 90 |
| UTF-16 | 55296 57236 | D800 DF94 | 55298 56400 | D802 DC50 | 55298 56592 | D802 DD10 |
| Numeric character reference | &#66452; | &#x10394; | &#67664; | &#x10850; | &#67856; | &#x10910; |
