= Teth =

Ninth letter of many Semitic abjads

← Heth Teth Yodh →
- Phoenician: 𐤈
- Hebrew: ט
- Samaritan: ࠈ
- Aramaic: 𐡈
- Syriac: ܛ
- Nabataean: 𐢋
- Arabic: ط
- South Arabian: 𐩷
- Geʽez: ጠ
- North Arabian: 𐪗
- Ugaritic: 𐎉
- Phonemic representation: tˤ
- Position in alphabet: 9
- Numerical value: 9

Alphabetic derivatives of the Phoenician
- Greek: Θ
- Latin: ϴ (Note: The Latin letter theta was never included in one of the 26 letters of the Latin alphabet. The Latin letter theta is only used in certain languages.)
- Cyrillic: Ѳ

Teth, also written as Tet or Ṭēth, is the ninth letter of the Semitic abjads, including Phoenician ṭēt 𐤈, Hebrew ṭēṯ ט, Aramaic ṭēṯ 𐡈, Syriac ṭēṯ ܛ, and Arabic ṭāʾ ط. It is also related to the Ancient North Arabian 𐪗, South Arabian 𐩷, and Geʽez ጠ.

The Phoenician letter also gave rise to the Greek theta (Θ), originally an aspirated voiceless dental stop but now used for the voiceless dental fricative. The Arabic letter (ط) is sometimes transliterated as Tah in English, for example in Arabic script in Unicode.

Teth represents the phoneme /tˤ/, one of the Semitic emphatic consonants.

== Origins ==
The Phoenician letter name ṭēt may mean "spinning wheel" pictured as (compare Hebrew root ט־ו־י (ṭ-w-y) meaning 'spinning' (a thread) which begins with Teth). According to another hypothesis (Brian Colless), the letter possibly continues a Middle Bronze Age glyph named ṭab 'good', Aramaic טַב 'ṭav', Hebrew טוב 'ṭov', Syriac ܛܒܐ 'ṭava', modern Arabic طَيّب 'ṭayyib', all of identical meaning.

Jewish religious books about the "holy letters" from the 10th century onward discuss the connection or origin of the letter Teth with the word ṭov "good". This is alluded to in a cryptic aggadata in the Talmud Baba Kamma 54b. Additionally the first time the letter "tes" appears in the Torah is in the word "ṭov" meaning "good." This was especially emphasized ever since the late 1600s after the Baal Shem Tov became influential, since the letter ṭēṯ was in his Acronym standing for ṭov, and goodness was part of his philosophy. The acrostic poems of the Bible use 'ṭov' to represent the letter (e.g. Psalm 119:65-72).

== Arabic ṭāʾ ==
Ṭāʾ طاء
- ط

Usage
- Writing system: Arabic script
- Type: Abjad
- Language of origin: Arabic language
- Sound values: tˤ
- Alphabetical position: 16

History
- Development: 𐤈; 𐡈; 𐢋; ط

Other
- Writing direction: Right-to-left

The letter is named ṭāʾ طَاءْ; Modern Standard Arabic pronunciation: /tˤ/.

It has four forms, and the letter does not change its shape depending on its position in the word:

Position in word:	Isolated	Final	Medial	Initial
Glyph form: (Help)	ط	ـط	ـطـ	طـ

== Hebrew teth ==
The Hebrew letter teth (Hebrew: טֵית, romanized: ṭēṯ) represents an emphatic voiced alveolar plosive /tˤ/, which has merged in pronunciation with /t/ in Modern Israeli, Ashkenazi, and Sephardic Hebrew to be pronounced [t]. Historically and in other less-prominent pronunciations, it is pharyngealised [tˤ], and in Pre-Exilic Hebrew, it was ejective [tʼ].

Orthographic variants
Serif	sans-Serif	Monospaced	Cursive Hebrew	Solitreo	Rashi script
ט	ט	ט			

In gematria, Teth represents the number nine. When followed by an apostrophe, it means 9,000. The most common example of this usage is in the numbers of the Hebrew years (e.g., ט׳תשנד in numbers would be the date 9754).

As well, in gematria, the number 15 is written with Teth and Vav, (9+6) to avoid the normal construction Yod and He (10+5) which spells a name of God. Similarly, 16 is written with Teth and Zayin (9+7) instead of Yod and Vav (10+6) to avoid spelling part of the Tetragrammaton.

Teth is also one of the seven letters which receive special crowns (called tagin) when written in a Torah Scroll. See Shin, Ayin, Gimel, Nun, Zayin, and Sade.

== Syriac teth ==
Position in word:	Isolated	Final	Medial	Initial
Glyph form: (Help)	ܛ	ـܛ	ـܛـ	ܛـ

== Similar symbols ==
A symbol similar to the Phoenician teth is used for the tensor product, as $\otimes$, but this is presumably an independent development, by modification of the multiplication sign ×. The Hebrew ט is also visually similar to the letter Ʋ.

== Character encodings ==
Character information
Preview	ט		ط		ܛ		ࠈ	
Unicode name	HEBREW LETTER TET		ARABIC LETTER TAH		SYRIAC LETTER TETH		SAMARITAN LETTER TIT	
Encodings	decimal	hex	dec	hex	dec	hex	dec	hex
Unicode	1496	U+05D8	1591	U+0637	1819	U+071B	2056	U+0808
UTF-8	215 152	D7 98	216 183	D8 B7	220 155	DC 9B	224 160 136	E0 A0 88
Numeric character reference	&#1496;	&#x5D8;	&#1591;	&#x637;	&#1819;	&#x71B;	&#2056;	&#x808;

Character information
Preview	𐎉		𐡈		𐤈	
Unicode name	UGARITIC LETTER TET		IMPERIAL ARAMAIC LETTER TETH		PHOENICIAN LETTER TET	
Encodings	decimal	hex	dec	hex	dec	hex
Unicode	66441	U+10389	67656	U+10848	67848	U+10908
UTF-8	240 144 142 137	F0 90 8E 89	240 144 161 136	F0 90 A1 88	240 144 164 136	F0 90 A4 88
UTF-16	55296 57225	D800 DF89	55298 56392	D802 DC48	55298 56584	D802 DD08
Numeric character reference	&#66441;	&#x10389;	&#67656;	&#x10848;	&#67848;	&#x10908;

== See also ==
- Ṭ
