= Heth =

Eighth letter of many Semitic alphabets

← Zayin Heth Teth →
- Phoenician: 𐤇
- Hebrew: ח
- Samaritan: ࠇ
- Aramaic: 𐡇
- Syriac: ܚ
- Nabataean: 𐢊
- Arabic: ح
- South Arabian: 𐩢
- Geʽez: ሐ
- North Arabian: 𐪂
- Ugaritic: 𐎈
- Phonemic representation: ħ, (χ, x)
- Position in alphabet: 8
- Numerical value: 8

Alphabetic derivatives of the Phoenician
- Greek: Η, Ͱ
- Latin: H
- Cyrillic: И, Й, Һ

Ḥeth, sometimes written Chet, Khet or Ḥet, is the eighth letter of the Semitic abjads, including Phoenician ḥēt 𐤇, Hebrew ḥēṯ ח, Aramaic ḥēṯ 𐡇, Syriac ḥēṯ ܚ, and Arabic ḥāʾ ح. It is also related to the Ancient North Arabian 𐪂, South Arabian 𐩢, and Ge'ez ሐ.

Heth originally represented a voiceless fricative, either pharyngeal /ħ/, or velar /x/. In Arabic, two corresponding letters were created for both phonemic sounds: unmodified ḥāʾ ح represents /ħ/, while ḫāʾ خ represents /x/.

The Phoenician letter gave rise to the Greek eta Η, Etruscan, Latin H, and Cyrillic И. While H is a consonant in the Latin alphabet, the Greek and Cyrillic equivalents represent vowel sounds, though the letter was originally a consonant in Greek and this usage later evolved into the rough breathing character. The Phoenician letter also gave rise to the archaic Greek letter heta, as well as a variant of Cyrillic letter I, short I. The Arabic letter (ح) is sometimes transliterated as Ch or Kh in English.

== Origins ==
The shape of the letter Ḥet probably goes back either to the Egyptian hieroglyph for 'courtyard' (ḥwt):

O6

(compare Hebrew: חָצֵר, romanized: ḥaṣēr of identical meaning, which begins with Ḥet).
or to the one for 'thread, wick' representing a wick of twisted flax: (ḥ)

V28

(compare Hebrew: חוּט, romanized: ḥuṭ of identical meaning, which begins with Ḥet).

Possibly named ḥasir in the Proto-Sinaitic script.

The corresponding South Arabian letters are ḥ and ḫ, corresponding to the Ge'ez letters Ḥawṭ ሐ and Ḫarm ኀ.

This letter is usually transcribed as ḥ, h with a dot underneath. In some romanization systems, a (capital) Ch or Kh is also used.

== Arabic ḥāʾ ==
Ḥāʾ حاء
- ح

Usage
- Writing system: Arabic script
- Type: Abjad
- Language of origin: Arabic language
- Sound values: ħ
- Alphabetical position: 6

History
- Development: 𐤇: 𐡇; 𐢊; ح

Other
- Writing direction: Right-to-left

The letter is named حَاءْ ḥāʾ and is the sixth letter of the alphabet. Its shape varies depending on its position in the word, and its initial and medial form resembles a bird's beak:

Position in word:	Isolated	Final	Medial	Initial
Glyph form: (Help)	ح	ـح	ـحـ	حـ

This form is used to denote three letters, the other two being خ ḫāʾ and ج ǧīm. In Maltese, the corresponding letter to ح is ħ.

=== Pronunciation ===
In Arabic, ḥāʾ is pharyngeal H [ħ] (similar to the English [h], but much "raspier").

In Persian, Urdu, Punjabi, etc., it is [h], like ⟨ه⟩ and the English h.

== Hebrew ḥēṯ ==
Orthographic variants
Various print fonts			Cursive Hebrew	Solitreo	Rashi script
Serif	Sans-serif	Monospaced	Cursive Hebrew	Solitreo	Rashi script
ח	ח	ח			

=== Pronunciation ===
In Modern Israeli Hebrew (and Ashkenazi Hebrew, although not under strict pronunciation), the letter Ḥēṯ (Hebrew: חֵית) usually has the sound value of a voiceless uvular fricative (/χ/), as the historical phonemes of the letters Ḥet ח (/ħ/) and Khaf כ (/x/) merged, both becoming the voiceless uvular fricative (/χ/). In more rare Ashkenazi phonologies, it is pronounced as a voiceless pharyngeal fricative (/ħ/).

The (/ħ/) pronunciation is still common among Israeli Arabs and Mizrahi Jews (particularly among the older generation and popular Mizrahi singers, especially Yemenites), in accordance with oriental Jewish traditions (see, e.g., Mizrahi Hebrew and Yemenite Hebrew).

The ability to pronounce the Arabic letter ḥāʾ (ح) correctly as a voiceless pharyngeal fricative /ħ/ is often used as a shibboleth to distinguish Arabic-speakers from non-Arabic-speakers; in particular, pronunciation of the letter as /x/ is seen as a hallmark of Ashkenazi and Greek Jews.

Ḥēṯ is one of the few Hebrew consonants that can take a vowel at the end of a word. This occurs when patach gnuva comes under the Ḥet at the end of the word. The combination is then pronounced /-aħ/ rather than /-ħa/. For example: פָּתוּחַ (/ˌpaˈtuaħ/), and תַּפּוּחַ (/ˌtaˈpuaħ/).

=== Variations ===
Ḥēṯ, along with Aleph, Ayin, Resh, and He, cannot receive a dagesh. As pharyngeal fricatives are difficult for most English speakers to pronounce, loanwords are usually Anglicized to have /h/. Thus challah (חלה), pronounced by native Hebrew speakers as /χala/ or /ħala/ is pronounced /halə/ by most English speakers, who cannot often perceive the difference between [h] and [ħ].

=== Significance ===
In gematria, Ḥet represents the number eight.

In chat rooms, online forums, and social networking the letter Ḥet repeated (חחחחחחחחחח) denotes laughter, just as in English, in the saying 'Haha'.

== Syriac ḥēṯ ==
Position in word:	Isolated	Final	Medial	Initial
Glyph form: (Help)	ܚ	ـܚ	ـܚـ	ܚـ

== Character encodings ==
Character information
Preview	ח		ح		ܚ		ࠇ	
Unicode name	HEBREW LETTER HET		ARABIC LETTER HAH		SYRIAC LETTER HETH		SAMARITAN LETTER IT	
Encodings	decimal	hex	dec	hex	dec	hex	dec	hex
Unicode	1495	U+05D7	1581	U+062D	1818	U+071A	2055	U+0807
UTF-8	215 151	D7 97	216 173	D8 AD	220 154	DC 9A	224 160 135	E0 A0 87
Numeric character reference	&#1495;	&#x5D7;	&#1581;	&#x62D;	&#1818;	&#x71A;	&#2055;	&#x807;

Character information
Preview	𐎈		𐡇		𐤇	
Unicode name	UGARITIC LETTER HOTA		IMPERIAL ARAMAIC LETTER HETH		PHOENICIAN LETTER HET	
Encodings	decimal	hex	dec	hex	dec	hex
Unicode	66440	U+10388	67655	U+10847	67847	U+10907
UTF-8	240 144 142 136	F0 90 8E 88	240 144 161 135	F0 90 A1 87	240 144 164 135	F0 90 A4 87
UTF-16	55296 57224	D800 DF88	55298 56391	D802 DC47	55298 56583	D802 DD07
Numeric character reference	&#66440;	&#x10388;	&#67655;	&#x10847;	&#67847;	&#x10907;

== See also ==
- Ħ, ħ : H with stroke
