= Resh =

Twentieth letter of many Semitic alphabets

← Qoph Resh Shin →
- Phoenician: 𐤓
- Hebrew: ר
- Samaritan: ࠓ
- Aramaic: 𐡓
- Syriac: ܪ
- Nabataean: 𐢛
- Arabic: ر
- South Arabian: 𐩧
- Geʽez: ረ
- North Arabian: 𐪇
- Ugaritic: 𐎗
- Phonemic representation: r (ɾ, ʁ, ʀ)
- Position in alphabet: 20
- Numerical value: 200

Alphabetic derivatives of the Phoenician
- Greek: Ρ (rho)
- Latin: R
- Cyrillic: Р (er)

Resh /rɛʃ/ is the twentieth letter of the Semitic abjads, including Phoenician rēš 𐤓, Hebrew rēš ר, Aramaic rēš 𐡓, Syriac rēš ܪ, and Arabic rāʾ ر. It is related to the Ancient North Arabian 𐪇, South Arabian 𐩧, and Ge'ez ረ. Its sound value is one of a number of rhotic consonants: usually [r] or [ɾ], but also [ʁ] or [ʀ] in Hebrew and some North Mesopotamian Arabic dialects.

In most Semitic alphabets, the letter resh (and its equivalents) is visually quite similar to the letter dalet (and its equivalents). In the Syriac alphabet, the letters became so similar that now they are only distinguished by dots; resh has a dot above it, and the otherwise identical dalet has a dot below. In the Arabic alphabet, rāʼ has a longer tail than dāl. In the Aramaic and Hebrew square alphabet, resh is a rounded single stroke while dalet is two strokes that meet at right angles.

The Phoenician letter gave rise to the Greek rho (Ρ/ρ), Etruscan, Latin R, Glagolitic Ⱃ, and Cyrillic Р and Armenian Ռ and Ր.

== Origins ==
Resh is usually assumed to mean "head", as in Proto-Semitic *raʾ(i)š- and descendants, like Biblical Hebrew רֹאשׁ (rosh) 'head'.

D1

== Arabic rāʾ ==
Rāʾ راء
- ر

Usage
- Writing system: Arabic script
- Type: Abjad
- Language of origin: Arabic language
- Sound values: r (ɾ)
- Alphabetical position: 10

History
- Development: 𐤓: 𐡓; 𐢛; ر

Other
- Writing direction: Right-to-left

The letter is named rāʾ راء in Arabic. It is written in several ways depending on its position in the word:

Position in word:	Isolated	Final	Medial	Initial
Glyph form: (Help)	ر	ـر	ـر	ر

It ranges between an alveolar trill [r], an alveolar flap [ɾ], and a uvular trill [ʀ] (the last of which is only found in a few modern varieties). It is pronounced as a postalveolar approximant [ɹ̠] in the traditional dialect of Fes.

=== Derived letter in other languages ===
Position in word:	Isolated	Final	Medial	Initial
Glyph form: (Help)	ݛ	ـݛ	ـݛ	ݛ

The Unicode standard for Arabic scripts also lists a variant with a full stroke (Unicode character U+075b: ݛ), suggesting that this form is used in certain Northern and Western African languages and some dialects in Pakistan.

In the Pashto alphabet, a variant of the letter rāʾ uses a ring below for the retroflex consonant [ɭ̆~ɽ] and another uses dots above and below the tail for the voiced fricative [ʐ] or [ʝ]:

Position in word:	Isolated	Final	Medial	Initial
Glyph form: (Help)	ړ	ـړ	ـړ	ړ

Position in word:	Isolated	Final	Medial	Initial
Glyph form: (Help)	ږ	ـږ	ـږ	ږ

== Hebrew resh ==
Orthographic variants
Various print fonts			Cursive Hebrew	Solitreo	Rashi script
Serif	Sans-serif	Monospaced	Cursive Hebrew	Solitreo	Rashi script
ר	ר	ר			

In Hebrew, Resh (רֵישׁ) represents a rhotic consonant that has different realizations for different dialects:

- In Modern Hebrew, the most common pronunciation is the voiced uvular fricative [ʁ].
- Ashkenazi use sometimes a uvular trill [ʀ] or an alveolar trill [r]. Native English-speakers replace it sometimes with an alveolar approximant [ɹ], as in English.
- Sephardic and Mizrahi use an alveolar trill [r], an alveolar flap [ɾ] or uvular trill [ʀ].

As a general rule, Resh, along with Ayin, Aleph, He, and Het, do not receive a dagesh. There are a handful of exceptions to this rule. In the Yemenite tradition, Resh is treated as most other consonants in that it can receive a dagesh hazak under certain circumstances. In the most widely accepted version of the Hebrew Bible, there are 17 instances of Resh being marked with a dagesh. The list is: 1 Samuel 1:6, 1 Samuel 10:24, 1 Samuel 17:25, 2 Kings 6:32, Jeremiah 39:12, Ezekiel 16:4 [×2], Habakkuk 3:13, Psalms 52:5, Proverbs 3:8, Proverbs 11:21, Proverbs 14:10, Proverbs 15:1, Job 39:9 (?), Song of Songs 5:2, Ezra 9:6, 2 Chronicles 26:10 (?)

In gematria, Resh represents the number 200.

=== As abbreviation ===
Resh as an abbreviation can stand for Rabbi (or Rav, Rebbe, Rabban, Rabbenu, and other similar constructions).

Resh may be found after a person's name on a gravestone, either to indicate that the person was a rabbi or to indicate Rav, a generic term for a teacher or a personal spiritual guide.

== Syriac resh ==
Position in word:	Isolated	Final	Medial	Initial
Glyph form: (Help)	ܪ	ـܪ	ـܪـ	ܪـ

== Character encodings ==
Character information
Preview	ר		ر		ܪ		ࠓ	
Unicode name	HEBREW LETTER RESH		ARABIC LETTER RA		SYRIAC LETTER RISH		SAMARITAN LETTER RISH	
Encodings	decimal	hex	dec	hex	dec	hex	dec	hex
Unicode	1512	U+05E8	1585	U+0631	1834	U+072A	2067	U+0813
UTF-8	215 168	D7 A8	216 177	D8 B1	220 170	DC AA	224 160 147	E0 A0 93
Numeric character reference	&#1512;	&#x5E8;	&#1585;	&#x631;	&#1834;	&#x72A;	&#2067;	&#x813;

Character information
Preview	𐎗		𐡓		𐤓	
Unicode name	UGARITIC LETTER RASHA		IMPERIAL ARAMAIC LETTER RESH		PHOENICIAN LETTER ROSH	
Encodings	decimal	hex	dec	hex	dec	hex
Unicode	66455	U+10397	67667	U+10853	67859	U+10913
UTF-8	240 144 142 151	F0 90 8E 97	240 144 161 147	F0 90 A1 93	240 144 164 147	F0 90 A4 93
UTF-16	55296 57239	D800 DF97	55298 56403	D802 DC53	55298 56595	D802 DD13
Numeric character reference	&#66455;	&#x10397;	&#67667;	&#x10853;	&#67859;	&#x10913;

== See also ==
- Rhoticity in English
- English-language vowel changes before historical /r/
