= List of Hebrew dictionaries =

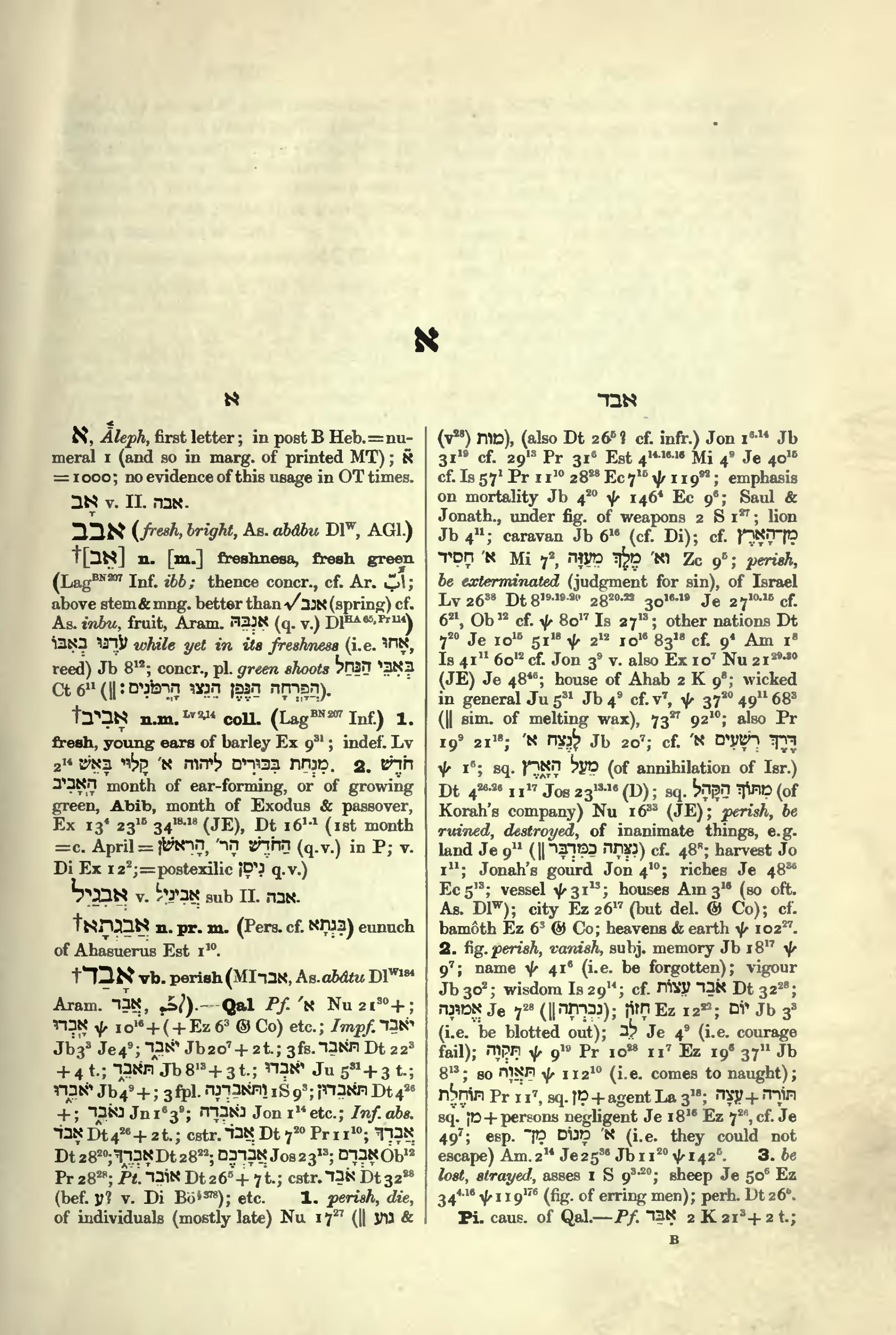
The first page of "aleph" in the Brown–Driver–Briggs "Hebrew and English Lexicon of the Old Testament"

Notable dictionaries of the Hebrew language include:

== Hebrew dictionaries for Hebrew speakers ==
=== Medieval dictionaries ===
- The first Hebrew dictionary that we know of is Mahberet Menahem by Menahem ben Saruq. It was written in Spain in the years 960-950. It contains all the words and roots in the Hebrew Bible.
- Rabbi Hai Gaon compiled dictionary of especially difficult words in the Bible, Targum, and Talmud, in the 10th or 11th century. The Arabic title of the book was Kitab al-Hawi.
- In the first half of the 11th century, Jonah ibn Janah compiled the Book of Roots (Kitab al-Usul), which is a complete dictionary of the Hebrew roots in the Bible.
- In the 11th century, Nathan ben Jehiel of Rome wrote The Arukh - a dictionary that deals with difficult and foreign words written in Hebrew letters in the Talmud and Midrash. The explanations for the words rely mainly on the literature of the Geonim and the author's interpretation. Each of the dictionary entries has a broad explanation in Hebrew, which sometimes also includes reference to other matters related to the subject.
- In 1161, Solomon ben Abraham ibn Parhon completed his Mahberet HaArukh Hebrew dictionary of the Biblical Hebrew, in the city of Salerno, Italy. It was influenced by the Mahberet of Menahem ben Saruq and the Arukh of Nathan of Rome. It also took material from Jonah ibn Janah's Book of Roots and Judah ben David Hayyuj's Book of Extracts.
- Rabbi David Kimhi compiled an Hebrew dictionary of the Hebrew language called Sefer HaShorashim (The Book of Roots), in the 12th or 13th century. It draws heavily from the previous works mentioned here.

=== Dictionaries published in 1500-1900 ===
- In 1561, Elia Levita published the Tishbi, an Hebrew dictionary of the Hebrew language of the Talmud and the Middle Ages, focusing on words that didn't appear in the Arukh.
- Solomon de Oliveyra published in the second half of the 17th century several Hebrew dictionaries: Sharshot gablut. Amsterdam. 1665. Rhyming dictionary; Zayit raanan. Amsterdam. 1683. A collection of Talmudic and scientific Hebrew terms with some Hebrew riddles; Darkhey noam. Amsterdam. 1688. A dictionary of rabbinical terms, published with Darkhey haShem (1689).
- In 1808 Judah Leib Ben-Ze'ev published in Vienna the dictionary Otzar haShorashim, a lexicon of Hebrew roots and Hebrew-German dictionary, inspired by the work of David Kimhi.
- Samuel Joseph Fuenn published in 1884 the first volume of an Hebrew dictionary called HaOtzar. It was completed by 1912 by others after his death in 1894.

=== Dictionaries published in 1900-Present ===
- Ben-Yehuda Dictionary, the first modern Hebrew dictionary, compiled by Eliezer Ben-Yehuda, whose first volumes were published in 1908.
- Even-Shoshan Dictionary, compiled by Avraham Even-Shoshan, originally published in 1948–1953 as מילון חדש (Hebrew for "New Dictionary").
- The Present Tense Dictionary, compiled by two members of the Academy of the Hebrew Language, edited in the present tense method, published in 1995, and reprinted in 2007.
- Sapir Dictionary
- רב-מילים, originally developed by the Israeli Center for Educational Technology, first published in 1997, including both a printed version and an electronic one. Currently maintained by Melingo.

== Historical Hebrew dictionaries ==
- Historical Dictionary Project of the Hebrew Language, a research project of the Academy of the Hebrew Language.

== Translation dictionaries ==
=== Historical and scholarly Hebrew translation dictionaries ===
==== Medieval dictionaries ====
- Agron, a 10th century lexicographical reference book by Saadia Gaon, including Arabic word translations.
- Kitāb Jāmiʿ al-Alfāẓ ("The Book of Collected Meanings"), a 10th century Hebrew-Aramaic-Arabic dictionary by David ben Abraham al-Fasi

==== Dictionaries published in 1500-1900 ====
- De Rudimentis Hebraicis, ("The fundamentals of Hebrew"), first published in 1506 by Johann Reuchlin, on the Hebrew grammar, including a Hebrew-Latin lexicon
- אוֹצַר לְשׁוֹן הַקֹּדֶשׁ, Thesaurus Linguae Sanctae, sive Lexicon Hebraicum ("Treasury of the sacred language, or Hebrew lexicon"), first published in 1529 by Santes Pagnino, a Hebrew Latin dictionary.
- Shemot Devarim, a Yiddish-Hebrew-Latin-German dictionary written by Elia Levita and published by Paul Fagius in 1542 in Isny

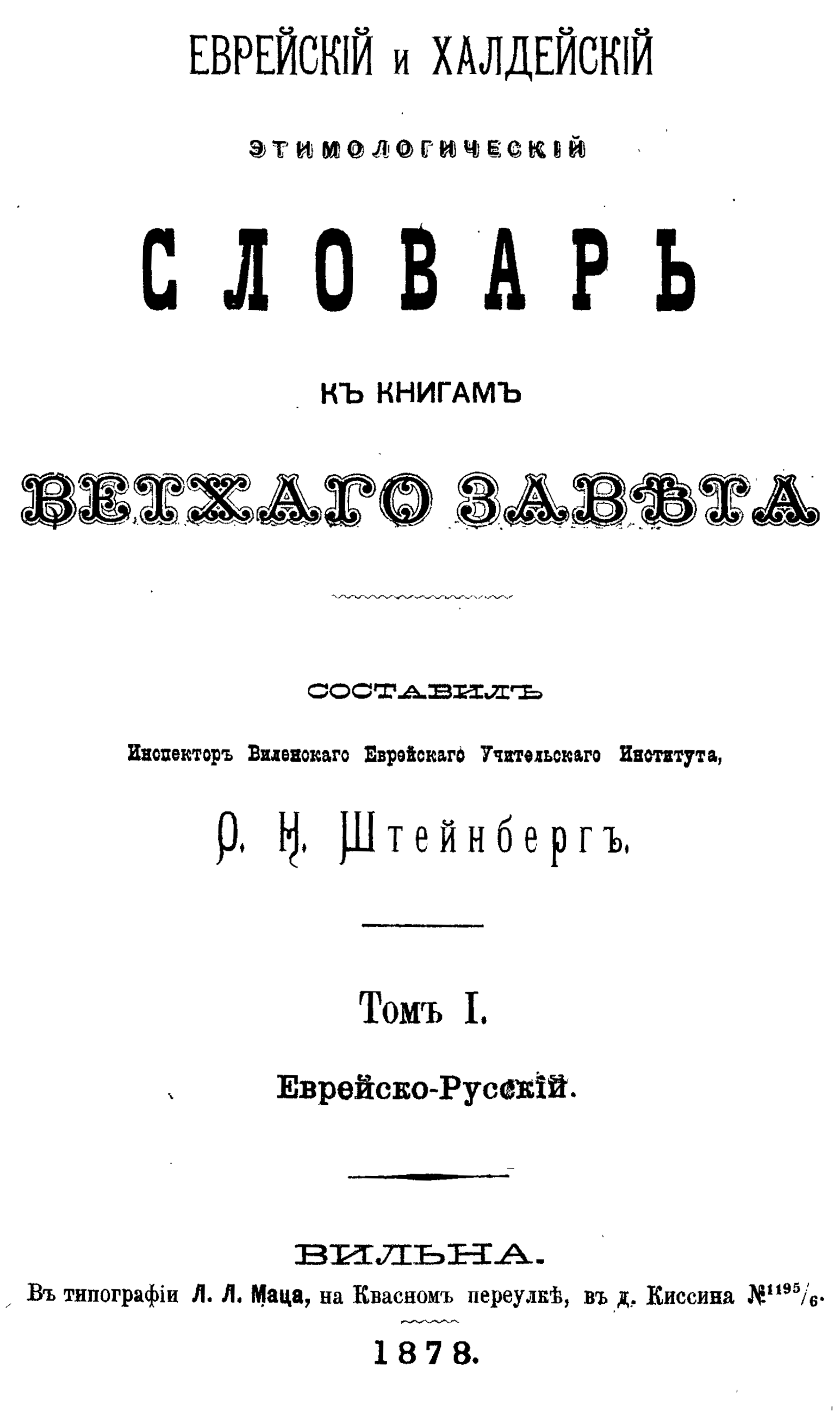
Cover of Steinberg O.N. Jewish and Chaldean etymological dictionary to Old Testament books 187

- Hebräisch-deutsches Handwörterbuch über die Schriften des Alten Testaments mit Einschluß der geographischen Nahmen und der chaldäischen Wörter beym Daniel und Esra (Hebrew-German Hand Dictionary on the Old Testament Scriptures including Geographical Names and Chaldean Words, with Daniel and Ezra), by Wilhelm Gesenius, published in 1810/1812
- A Hebrew, Latin and English Dictionary; containing all the Hebrew and Chaldee Words used in the Old Testament, by Joseph Samuel Christian Frederick Frey, published 1815 by Gale and Fenner, Paternoster-Row
- Lexicon Hebraicum et Chaldaicum cum brevi Lexico Rabbinico Philosophico, a Hebrew and Chaldean lexicon by Johannes Buxtorf, published in 1607, reprinted in Glasgow, 1824.
- Steinberg O.N. (Father to the soviet composer of classical music Maximilian Osseyevich Steinberg): Jewish and Chaldean etymological dictionary to Old Testament books. T. 1-3. Vilna: Type. L. L. Matza, 1878–1881. (A Biblical hebrew dictionary in the Russian language) Штейнберг О. Н. Еврейский и халдейский этимологический словарь к книгам Ветхого Завета. Т. 1–3. Вильна: тип. Л. Л. Маца, 1878– 1881.
- Neues Hebräisch-deutsches Handwörterbuch über das Alte Testament mit Einschluß des biblischen Chaldaismus ("New Hebrew-German hand dictionary on the Old Testament including Chaldean words"), by Wilhelm Gesenius, originally published in Leipzig in 1815. Also available as a digitized version of the 16th edition, 1915 and 18th edition reprint, from Springer Verlag, Berlin 2008, ISBN 3-540-78599-X
- Strong's Concordance, a Bible concordance first published in 1890, that indexes every word in the King James Version, including the 8674 Biblical Hebrew root words used in the Old Testament, and includes a Hebrew English dictionary.

==== Dictionaries published in 1900-Present ====
- Brown–Driver–Briggs, A Hebrew and English Lexicon of the Old Testament, first published in 1906.
- Lexicon in Veteris Testamenti libros, a scholarly translation dictionary, consisting of "Ludwig Koehler - Dictionary of the Hebrew Old Testament in English and German", and "Walter Baumgartner - A Dictionary of the Aramaic parts of the Old Testament in English and German", published in 1953.
- Hebrew and Aramaic Lexicon of the Old Testament, an English-only version, with updates, of the Lexicon in Veteris Testamenti libros, published 1994-2000.

=== Modern Hebrew translation dictionaries ===
- מלון ערבי עברי ללשון הערבית החדשה - قاموس عربي - عبري للغة العربية العصرية ("Arabic-Hebrew Dictionary of Modern Arabic"), compiled by David Ayalon, Pessach Shinar and Moshe Brill, published by the Hebrew University, 1978
- Babylon, a computer dictionary and translation program.
- מורפיקס, an online Hebrew English dictionary by Melingo.
- New Hebrew-German Dictionary: with grammatical notes and list of abbreviations, compiled by Wiesen, Moses A., published by Rubin Mass, Jerusalem, in 1936
- The modern Greek-Hebrew, Hebrew-Greek dictionary, compiled by Despina Liozidou Shermister, first published in 2018
- The Oxford English Hebrew dictionary, published in 1998 by the Oxford University Press.
- Hebrew serbian dictionary Hebrejsko-srpski rečnik Željko Stanojević, Rad 2001.
