= Despina Liozidou Shermister =

Greek-born Israeli lexicographer and translator

Despina Liozidou Shermister (Greek: Δέσποινα Λιοζίδου Σέρμιστερ, Hebrew: דספינה ליוזידו שרמיסטר) is a Greek-born Israeli lexicographer and translator.

== Biography ==
Despina Shermister is the author of the first modern Greek-Hebrew, Hebrew-Greek dictionary.

== Published works ==
- Despina Liozidou Shermister, מילון עברי-יווני יווני-עברי, Kinneret Zmora-Bitan Dvir

=== Translations ===
- Alexandros Papadiamantis, סוחרי האומות (The merchants of the nations, Greek: Οι έμποροι των εθνών, with Chaim Pessah (2015), כתב
- Christos Chomenidis, הילד החכם (The Wise Kid, Greek: Το σοφό παιδί), with Chaim Pessah (2012), Yediot Aharonot Books
- Christos Chomenidis, תרנגול ללא רחמים (Greek: Πετεινός δίχως έλεος), with Chaim Pessah (2009), Yediot Aharonot Books, ISBN 978-965-482-743-0
- Nikos Kazantzakis, נחש ושושן צחור (Greek: Όφις και κρίνο), with Chaim Pessah (2010), אבן חושן, ISBN 978-965-537-021-8
- Odysseas Elytis, מונוגרמה (The Monogram, Greek: Το Μονόγραμμα) in magazine Moznaim, with Chaim Pessah (2010),
