= List of Hebrew words of Persian origin =

This entry lists words borrowed from Persian to Hebrew. As the Jews lived as an exiled and homecoming population for almost two centuries under the Persian Empire, many borrowed words spoken within the empire. These words stayed with Hebrew for generations and helped shape Hebrew's vocabulary for terms the Israelites weren't familiar with before living and interacting with Persians. The Persian monarch Cyrus the Great, who let the Jews' Return to Zion, is a character beloved by the Jews for his part in their history.

== Botanics ==
- Etrog - אֶתְרוֹג = A fruit, it derives from the Persian word "turung" which means "Greenish-Yellowish" (originally from Tamil).
- Pistuk - פִּיסְטוּק = Pistachio. Comes from "pistah" in Persian.
- Limon - לִימוֹן = Lemon, in Persian it's a general name for citrus.
- Lilach - לִילָךְ = Lilac: a lighter shade of purple, and also the Hebrew name of Syringa. Derives from "nilak" in Persian.
- Pardes - פַּרְדֵּס = Orchard. This word was also the core for "Paradise".
- Shoshana - שׁוֹשַׁנָּה = Rose. From the name of the once capital of the Persian Empire, Shushan.
- Sukar - סֻכָּר = Sugar. From the Persian word "shakar" that was borrowed from Sanskrit.

== Politics ==
- Saris - סָרִיס = A male servant to the monarch who was sterilised to prevent him from having any hopes of usurping the throne.
- Gizbar - גִּזְבָּר = A man in-charge of the money and taxes of the local community. Comes from "ganzabara" in Persian which means: "Holder of the Treasury".

== Slang ==
- Ashkara - אַשְׁכָּרָה = Describe something that is transparent and "as it is". Comes from "Ashkara" in Persian which means "A known thing".

== Places ==
- Bazar - בָּזָאר = Market. Comes from "bāzār" in Persian.
- Duhan - דּוּכָן = A small stage or a market stall.
- Parvar - פַּרְוָר = A suburb. In persian means a pavilion.

== Others ==
- Amarkol - אֲמַרְכׇּל = Title applied to a Temple trustee superintending the cashiers. From the persian word "amarkir" which means master of finance.
- Haki - חָאקִי = Khaki. From the Persian word "khāk" which means dust.
- Sarbal - סַרְבָּל = Overalls. From the word "shalvar" in Persian which means pants.
