= Elia Levita =

Renaissance Hebrew grammarian, scholar and poet (1469–1549)

- Born: February 13, 1469; Neustadt an der Aisch
- Died: January 28, 1549 (aged 79); Venice
- Occupations: grammarian; teacher; poet; translator
- Known for: Teaching Hebrew and Jewish mysticism to Christian clergy
- Notable work: Bovo-Bukh

Elia Levita (Note: also known as Elijah Levita, Elias Levita, Élie Lévita, Elia Levita Ashkenazi, Eliahu Levita, Eliyahu haBahur ("Elijah the Bachelor"), Elye Bokher) (Hebrew: אליהו בן אשר הלוי אשכנזי, 13 February 1469 – 28 January 1549) was a Renaissance Hebrew grammarian, Hebraist, and poet. He was the author of the Bovo-Bukh, the most popular Yiddish chivalric romance. He was one of the foremost teachers of Hebrew and Jewish mysticism to Christian clergy, nobility, and intellectuals during the Renaissance.

== Early life ==
Levita was born in Neustadt (near Nuremberg) to Levite Jewish family, the youngest of nine brothers. He preferred to call himself "Ashkenazi", and bore also the nickname Bokher, meaning youth or student, which later he gave as title to his Hebrew grammar. The Jews were expelled from this area during his early adulthood, thus he would move to Italy, which would remain his primary home until death.

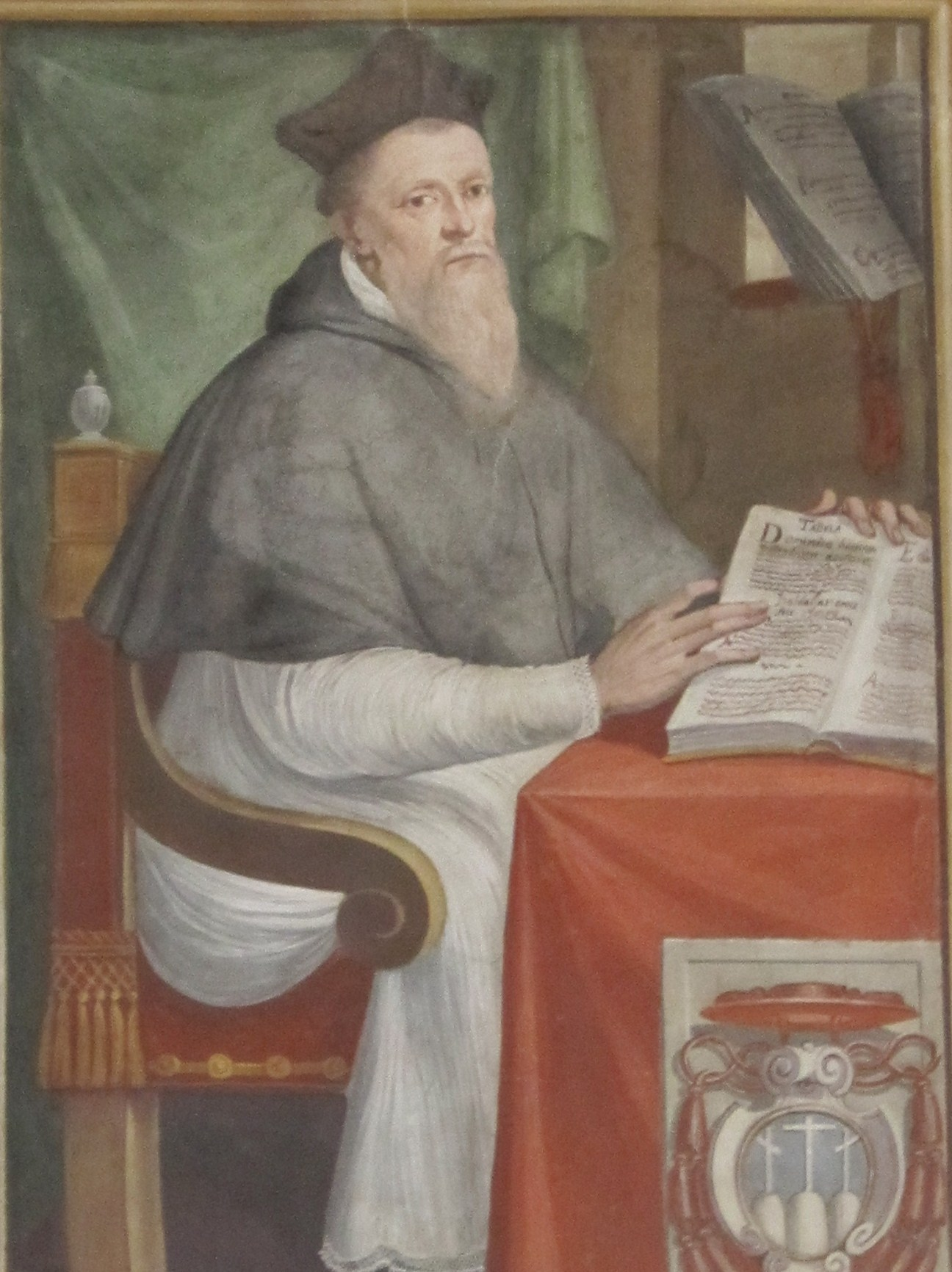
Cardinal Giles of Viterbo

He wrote the 650 ottava rima stanzas of the Bovo-Bukh in Padua in 1504, based on the popular romance Buovo d'Antona, itself based on the Anglo-Norman romance, Bevis of Hampton. He was living in Venice by 1514, where he wrote two scathing satirical pasquinades. He moved to Rome that same year, where he acquired a friend and patron, the Renaissance humanist cardinal, Giles of Viterbo, whose palace he lived in for more than a decade. Levita taught Hebrew to Giles, and copied Hebrew manuscripts, mostly related to the Kabbalah, for the cardinal's library.

The first edition of Levita's Baḥur is dedicated to his patron, to whom he also dedicated his Concordance. The Sack of Rome in 1527 sent him into exile once more, back to Venice, where he worked as a proofreader and taught Hebrew. He published a treatise in Venice on the laws of Hebrew cantillation, entitled Sefer Tuv Ta'am.

== Bavaria ==
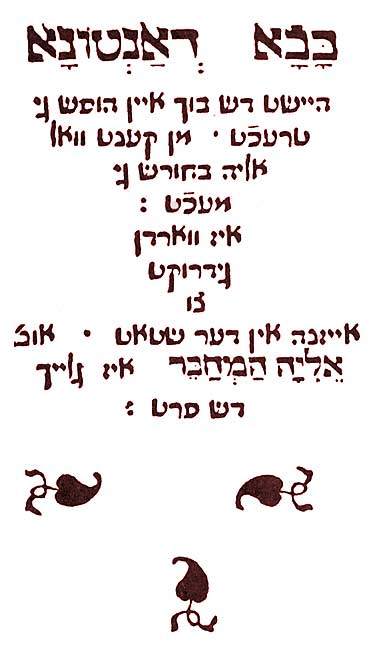
Printed Edition of Bovo-Bukh, Isny, 1541

He left alone in 1540 for Isny, Bavaria, on the invitation of Paul Fagius to superintend his Hebrew printing-press there. During his time with Fagius, he published several works. Tishbi, a dictionary focusing on words that don't appear in the Nathan ben Jehiel's Arukh, containing 712 words used in Talmud and Midrash, with explanations in German and a Latin translation by Fagius. Sefer Meturgeman, explaining all the Aramaic words found in the Targum; Shemot Devarim, an alphabetical list of Yiddish technical terms translated into Hebrew, Latin, and German;, and a new and revised edition of his Baḥur. While in Germany, he also printed his Bovo-Bukh.

During the Reformation, which saw an increase in study of the Hebrew Bible, and its language and importance in the history of the world, he furthered the learning of Hebrew in Christian circles by his teachings and writings. To his pupils especially belong Sebastian Münster, who translated Levita's grammatical works into Latin, and Georges de Selve, Bishop of Lavaur, the French ambassador in Venice. It was also during this time that he became acquainted with Samson Ha-Nakdan.

== Later years ==
On returning to Venice, in spite of his great age, Elia worked on editions of several works, including David Kimhi's Miklol, which he also annotated. He died there 28 January 1549. His monument in the graveyard of the Jewish community at Venice boasts of him that "he illuminated the darkness of grammar and turned it into light."

== Legacy ==
He has descendants living today, including former Prime Minister of the United Kingdom David Cameron, who describes him as "my forefather Elijah Levita who wrote what is thought to have been the first ever Yiddish novel".

== Works ==
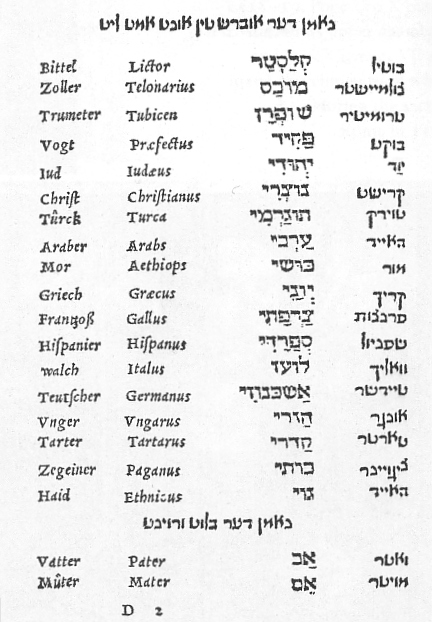
A page from Levita's Yiddish-Hebrew-Latin-German dictionary

- Elia Levita Bachur's Bovo-Buch: A Translation of the Old Yiddish Edition of 1541 with Introduction and Notes by Elia Levita Bachur, translated and notes by Jerry C. Smith, Fenestra Books, 2003, ISBN 1-58736-160-4.
- Helia Levita (das ist: Elijah Levita): שְמוֹתֿ דְבָֿרִים [...] Nomenclatura Hebraica Autore Helia Levita Germano Grammatico, in gratiam omnium tyronum ac studiosorum linguæ sanctę. Isny, published by Paul Fagius, 1542.

- Kaltenstadler, Wilhelm (ed.), Helia Levita: Nomenclatura Hebraica: Wörterbuch Jiddisch-Deutsch-Latein-Hebräisch. [Nomenclatura Herbraica: Yiddish-German-Latin-Hebrew Dictionary], facsimile, Utopia Boulevard U.B.W. Press, Hamburg 2004, ISBN 3-9809509-6-4.
- Rosenfeld, Moshe N. (ed.): Nomenclatura Hebraica. London 1988, OCLC 233860721.

- Short description in English p. 189. (books.google.com)

- Paris and Vienna (attributed)
- miscellaneous shorter poems
- The Massoreth Ha-Massoreth of Elias Levita, being an exposition of the Massoretic notes on the Hebrew Bible, or the ancient critical apparatus of the Old Testament in Hebrew, with an English translation, and critical and explanatory notes, London, Longmans, 1867

== Bibliography ==
- Gottheil, Richard and Jacobs, Joseph Baba Buch, Jewish Encyclopedia, 1901-1906
- Liptzin, Sol, A History of Yiddish Literature, Jonathan David Publishers, Middle Village, NY, 1972, ISBN 0-8246-0124-6.
- Stern, Heidi: Elia Levitas „Shemot Devarim“ von 1542, in: Lexicographica, 26 (2010), 205–228. doi 10.1515/9783110223231.3.205
- Weil, Gérard E., Élie Lévita. Humaniste et massoréte (1469-1549), Leiden: Brill, 1963.
