= Shemot Devarim =

1542 dictionary by Elia Levita

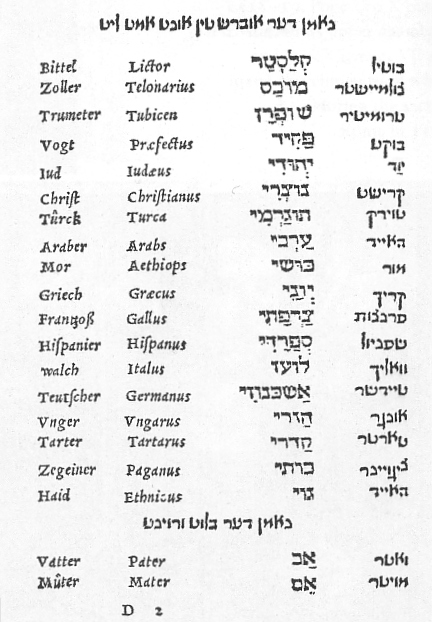
A page from the Shemot Devarim

The Shemot Devarim (Hebrew: שְמוֹתֿ דְבָֿרִים, Ashkenazi pronunciation sh'mós d'vorím: "The names of things") or Nomenclatura Hebraica (Latin, "Hebrew nomenclature") is a Yiddisch-Hebrew-Latin-German dictionary (read in a right-to-left direction, as in Hebrew), which was composed by the Renaissance scholar Elia Levita and published by Paul Fagius in the German city of Isny in the year 1542.

The book begins with a bilingual Hebrew-Latin title page, with a foreword in Latin on the reverse-side. The majority of the work is dedicated to translations of Yiddish words into the three other languages and is the first-known dictionary to be collated according to the alphabetical order of the Yiddish language. Of the 1039 entries, a little under half are organised into twelve thematic chapters, with the rest of the book covers specialist topics such as diseases, medicaments and the names of professions. The final three pages offer explanations of various Hebrew terms.
