= Bovo-Bukh =

Old Yiddish chivalric romance

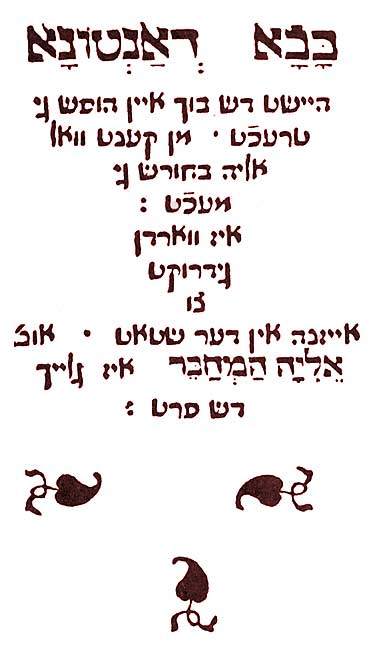
- Title page of the printed edition of Elia Levita's Bovo-Bukh, Isny (Germany), circa 1541
- Author: Elia Levita
- Original title: בָּבָא דְאַנְטוֹנָא
- Language: Yiddish
- Genre: Chivalric romance
- Publication date: 1541
- Publication place: Papal States

The Bovo-Bukh (בָּבָא־בּוּך, בּאָבאָ־בּוּך; German transliteration: Baba Buch), also known as Buovo d'Antona (בָּבָא דְאַנְטוֹנָא), is a Yiddish chivalric romance written by Elia Levita between 1506 and 1508. Sol Liptzin described it as "the most outstanding poetic work in Old Yiddish".

The Bovo-Bukh became widely known in the late 18th century under the title Bovo-mayse (literally "Bovo’s tale"). The expression later evolved into Bubbe meise, meaning "old wives' tale".

== Plot summary ==
The story, adapted from the Anglo-Norman romance of Bevis of Hampton, recounts the adventures of Bovo and Druzane. Although the narrative has little connection to Jewish life, it distinguishes itself from other chivalric romances by limiting Christian imagery and introducing elements of Jewish culture and customs.

The tale begins with Bovo’s young mother conspiring to have her elderly husband, the king, killed during a hunt. After his death, she marries his murderer, who then plots to poison Bovo out of fear that he will seek vengeance. Bovo escapes and flees to Flanders, where he works as a stable boy for the king and falls in love with the king’s daughter, Druzane.

A Saracen sultan from Babylonia then arrives with an army of ten thousand soldiers, demanding Druzane’s hand in marriage for his son, Lucifer. When the king refuses, war breaks out. Bovo, riding the magical horse Pumele and wielding the enchanted sword Rundele, defeats the sultan’s army and kills Lucifer. Although promised Druzane’s hand, Bovo is later imprisoned in Babylonia for a year.

Believing Bovo to be dead, Druzane agrees to marry a knight named Macabron. On the day of the wedding, Bovo, disguised as a beggar, appears and escapes with Druzane. They hide in a forest where Druzane gives birth to twins. Bovo departs to find a way back to Flanders but is presumed dead after an encounter with a lion. Druzane returns to Flanders with the twins. When Bovo finally returns and learns that his family is gone, he joins a campaign against Antona, kills his stepfather, and claims the crown. In the end, he is reunited with Druzane, who becomes his queen.

== Modern editions ==
- Elia Levita Bachur's Bovo-Buch: A Translation of the Old Yiddish Edition of 1541 with Introduction and Notes by Elia Levita Bachur, translated and annotated by Jerry C. Smith, Fenestra Books, 2003, ISBN 1-58736-160-4.

== Original Yiddish editions online ==
- Modern facsimile edition by Judah A. Joffe at Bovo Bukh (Open Library)
- Modern Yiddish verse translation by M. Knapheis at Bovo Bukh (Open Library)
