= Judah Joffe =

Ukrainian-American Yiddish philologist

Judah Achilles Joffe (April 19, 1873 – September 16, 1966; Yiddish: יודאַ אַ. יאָפֿע) was a Yiddish philologist.

Joffe was born in Yekaterinoslav, Russian Empire (now Dnipro, Ukraine). He immigrated to the United States in 1891 and enrolled at Columbia College, where he studied general philology with Harry Thurston Peck and graduated with a B.A. in 1893. Among Joffe's noted works is his 1949 critical edition of the Bovo-Bukh, the most popular chivalric romance in the Yiddish language. He was also a co-editor, with Yudel Mark, of the Great Dictionary of the Yiddish Language (Groyser ṿerṭerbukh fun der Yidisher shprakh, גרויסער ווערטערבוך פון דער יידישער שפראך). In addition, he researched the Slavic component in Yiddish, published musicological work about Russian composers, translated Yiddish, English, and French, and proposed regularized spelling for Yiddish. Joffe was a co-founder of the American branch of YIVO, and active in its linguistics section together with other scholars of Yiddish including Max Weinreich and Shmuel Niger.

He died in New York City in 1966.
