= Paul Fagius =

Protestant scholar and theologian

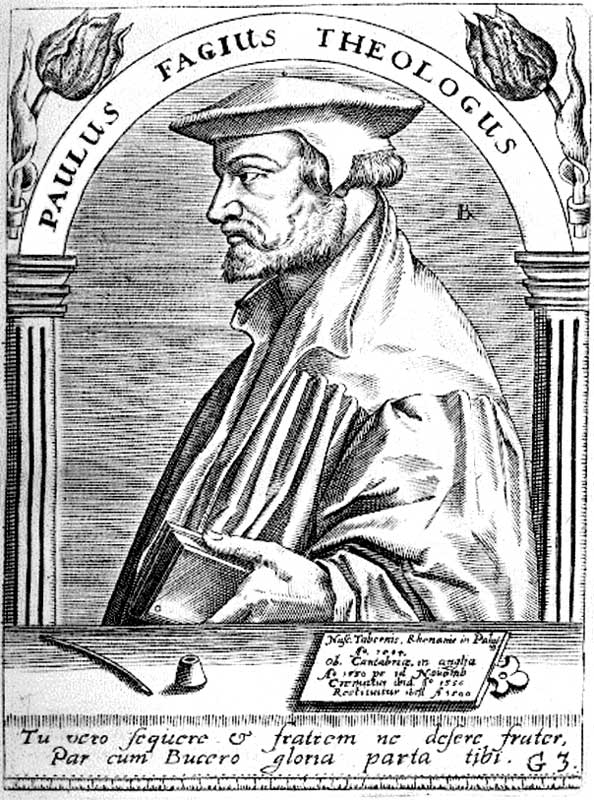
Paul Fagius

Paul Fagius (1504 – 13 November 1549) was a Renaissance scholar of Biblical Hebrew and Protestant reformer.

== Life ==
Fagius was born at Rheinzabern in 1504. His father was a teacher and council clerk. In 1515 he went to study at the University of Heidelberg and in 1518 was present at the Heidelberg Disputation. In 1522 he moved to the University of Strasbourg, where he learned Hebrew and met Matthäus Zell, Martin Bucer and Wolfgang Capito.

In 1527, he became a school master in the free imperial city of Isny im Allgäu. Fagius took part in the Bern Colloquy, where he met the reformer Huldrych Zwingli. In 1535, he returned to the University of Strasbourg to devote himself to his study of theology.

Fagius returned to Isny as a priest in 1537. There he learnt Hebrew from the Jewish grammarian and publisher Elia Levita, and they founded a printing office together. One of the few known works to be published by this partnership was Shemot Devarim, an Old Yiddish-Hebrew-Latin-German dictionary, in 1542.

In 1543, he organized the Kirchenwesen in Konstanz and in 1544 was appointed Professor of Old Testament studies at Strasbourg. In 1546, he moved back to Heidelberg, after Elector Frederick II charged him with reforming the University of Heidelberg. Fagius however encountered such strong opposition that his reform failed and he returned to Strasbourg.

With the rise of the Counter-Reformation Paul Fagius found himself under pressure. After the defeat of the Schmalkaldic League in 1547, Fagius, who had opposed the Augsburg Interim, found himself dismissed from his position, along with Martin Bucer. Both sought refuge in England, where they were taken in by Thomas Cranmer. In 1549, Fagius was appointed Hebrew lecturer at the University of Cambridge.

After being briefly active in Hebrew philology and interpreting the Old Testament Fagius died from plague in 1549, and was buried in St Michael's Church, Cambridge. Under Queen Mary's Catholic restoration, his remains were exhumed and burned (as were Martin Bucer's); in 1560, a memorial was again set up to him.

== Works ==
=== Latin translations from Hebrew ===
- Pirḳe Abot (1541)
- Levita's "Tishbi" (1541)
- Tobit (1542)
- Alfabeta de Ben Sira (1542)
- David Ḳimḥi's commentary on Psalms, ch. i.-x. (1544)

=== Editions ===
- Targum Onḳelos (1546)

=== Original works ===
- Exegesis of the first four chapters of Genesis (1542)
- Elementary Hebrew grammar (1543)
- Liber Fidei ספר אמנה (1542)
- Parvus Tractulus (1542)
