= Christos Chomenidis =

Greek novelist

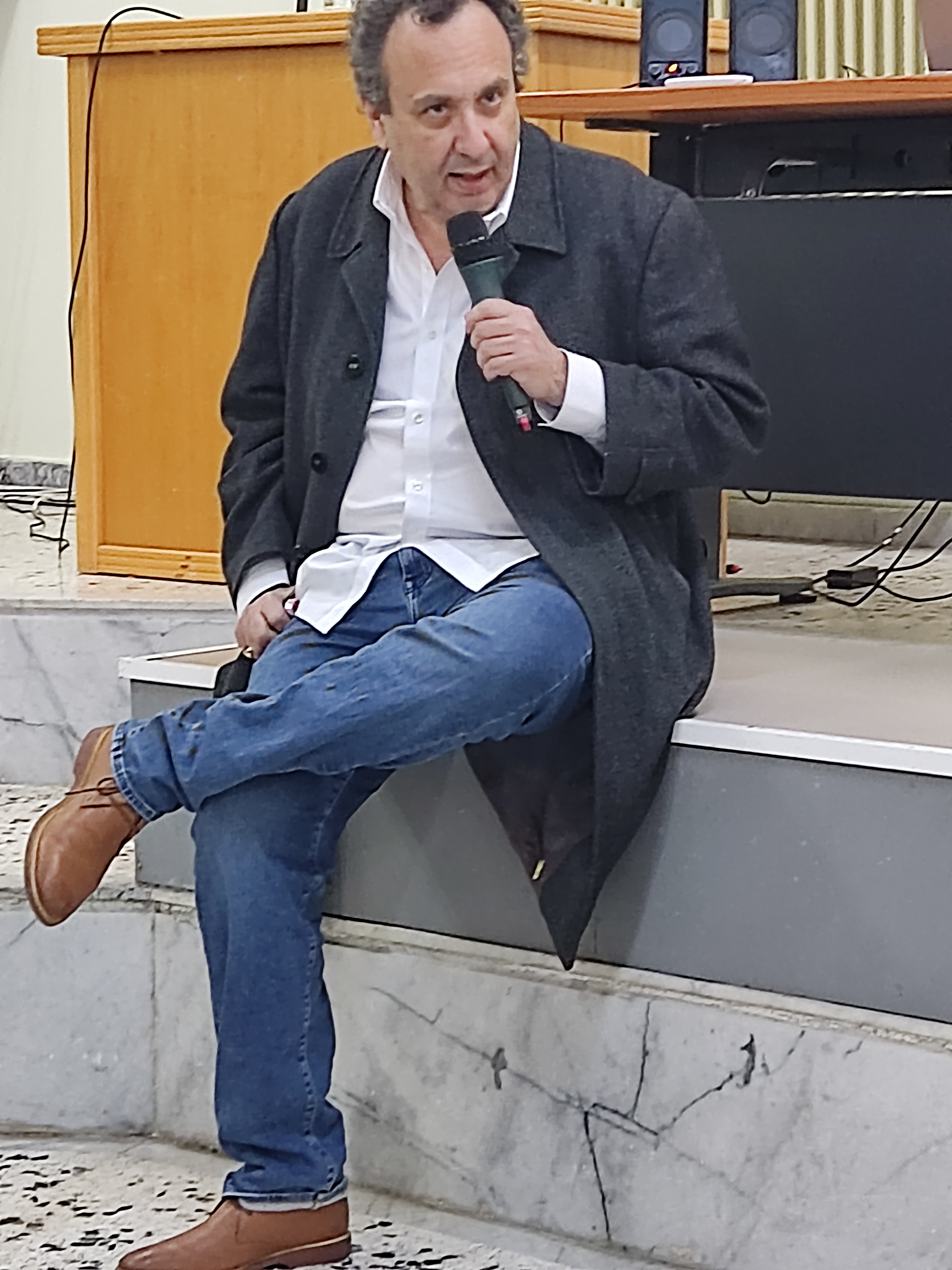
- Hristos Homenidis during a visit at a Greek school, 2022
- Born: 3 August 1966 (age 60); Athens, Greece
- Occupation: Novelist
- Writing career
- Period: 1993–present

Christos Chomenidis (Greek: Χρήστος Χωμενίδης; born 3 August 1966) is a Greek novelist. He was born and raised in Athens, where he completed his studies at Athens College on a scholarship.

He is the grandson of Christos Chomenidis, co-founder of the National Liberation Front (EAM), and Vasilis Neveloudis, secretary of the Central Committee of the Communist Party of Greece before WWII. His paternal grandmother’s brother was Dimitris Glinos.

== Biography ==
He graduated from the Law School of the University of Athens in 1990, then pursued legal studies in Russia and communications studies in the UK.

In 1993, he published his first novel, The Wise Child, which was met with both enthusiasm and, at times, shock from readers and critics alike. Since then, he has published thirteen more novels, three short story collections, and two collections of essays. His work has been translated into ten languages.

Chomenidis’s writings span a wide range of subjects—from the popular music industry in The Voice to pre-Homeric Greece in Feather-Words.

His novel Niki, a chronicle of a family, earned him the State Literature Prize, the Anagnostis Magazine Award, and the Public Book Readers’ Award. In December 2021, Niki received the Prix du Livre Européen (European Book Prize).

His novel The Phoenix was also awarded the Public Readers’ Prize.

Both Niki and The Phoenix have received rave reviews in French and Dutch newspapers. On July 12, 2023, Le Monde dedicated the entire front page of its book supplement to The Phoenix.

== Public engagement ==
Christos Chomenidis was a founding member of the Democratic Left (DIMAR) in 2010. He was elected to both the Central Committee and the Executive Committee of the party. On June 12, 2013, he left DIMAR. He describes himself politically as a liberal social democrat, but since then he has not joined any political party. In the 2015 Greek bailout referendum, he supported the "Yes" vote.

He has been contributing articles to newspapers and magazines for thirty years. Since 2015, he has had a weekly column in the newspaper Ta Nea and the website Capital.gr. From 2002 to 2010, he hosted a daily radio show. Since the spring of 2020, he has been producing his own podcast on the pod.gr platform.

In October 2023, following the massacre carried out by Hamas and before the Israeli counteroffensive began, he published an article in Ta Nea expressing solidarity with the innocent victims and with Israeli democratic civil society. In the same article, he described Israel as an "advanced outpost of Western civilization" and asserted that "[Israel] will clean up on behalf of all of us." Since then, he has repeatedly issued appeals to a Jewish audience for an end to the war and for Israel to respect Palestinian civilians: "I take the liberty of imploring you. Of beseeching you. Transcend 'an eye for an eye.' Be the ones to blaze the trail toward peace. Put yourselves in the place of the other civilians. That will be your greatest moral triumph."

In an article on Capital, he condemned those who disrupted the participation of the Israeli embassy in the 2025 Thessaloniki International Book Fair, accusing them of antisemitism.

== Personal life ==
He lives in Kypseli, Athens, and is unmarried. He speaks English and Russian.

== Works ==
=== Novels ===
- The Wise Child – Estia Publications, 1993 – ISBN 9789600504828
- The Height of the Circumstances – Estia Publications, 1995 – ISBN 9789600506624
- The Voice – Estia Publications, 1998 – ISBN 9789600508147
- Pluperfect – Estia Publications, 2003 – ISBN 9789600510782
- The House and the Cell – Patakis Publications, 2005 – ISBN 9789601618036
- Words-Wings – Patakis Publications, 2009 – ISBN 9789601633220
- The World Made to Measure – Patakis Publications, 2012 – ISBN 9789601644158
- Niki – Patakis Publications, 2014 – ISBN 9789601652481
- Young White Deer – Patakis Publications, 2016 – ISBN 9789601663760
- The Phoenix – Patakis Publications, 2018 – ISBN 9789601678603
- Her King – Patakis Publications, 2020 – ISBN 9789601687223
- Jimmy in Kypseli – Patakis Publications, 2021 – ISBN 9789601698014
- The Trial of Suarez – Patakis Publications, 2023
- Pandora – Patakis Publications, 2024

=== Short Story Collections ===
- I Won’t Do You the Favor – Estia Publications, 1997 – ISBN 9789600507461
- Second Life – Estia Publications, 2000 – ISBN 9789600509083
- Let Them Mark Us Absent at the Second Coming – Patakis Publications, 2010 – ISBN 9789601639604

=== Essay Collections ===
- The More He Beat Me, the Louder I Sang to Him – Patakis Publications, 2017 – ISBN 9789601676012
- The Duck Knows Where the Lake Is – Patakis Publications, 2024

=== Translations ===
- La jeune sage (French, 1997)
- La hauteur des circonstances (French, 1998)
- La Voix Volee (French, 2001)
- Il Bambino Saggio (Italian, 2000)
- Sirket (Turkish, 2008)
- Petinos Dixos Eleos (Hebrew, 2009)
- To Sofo Pedi (Hebrew, 2012)
- Niki (French, 2021)
- Niki (English, 2023)
- Niki (Dutch, 2024)
- Le Phénix (French, 2023)
