= Cursive script =

Cursive script may refer to:

- Cursive, handwriting styles
- Roman cursive, a style of Latin calligraphy
- Cursive Hebrew, a style of Hebrew calligraphy
- Cursive script (East Asia), a style of Chinese calligraphy
