= Torah ark =

Receptacle which contains a synagogue's Torah scrolls

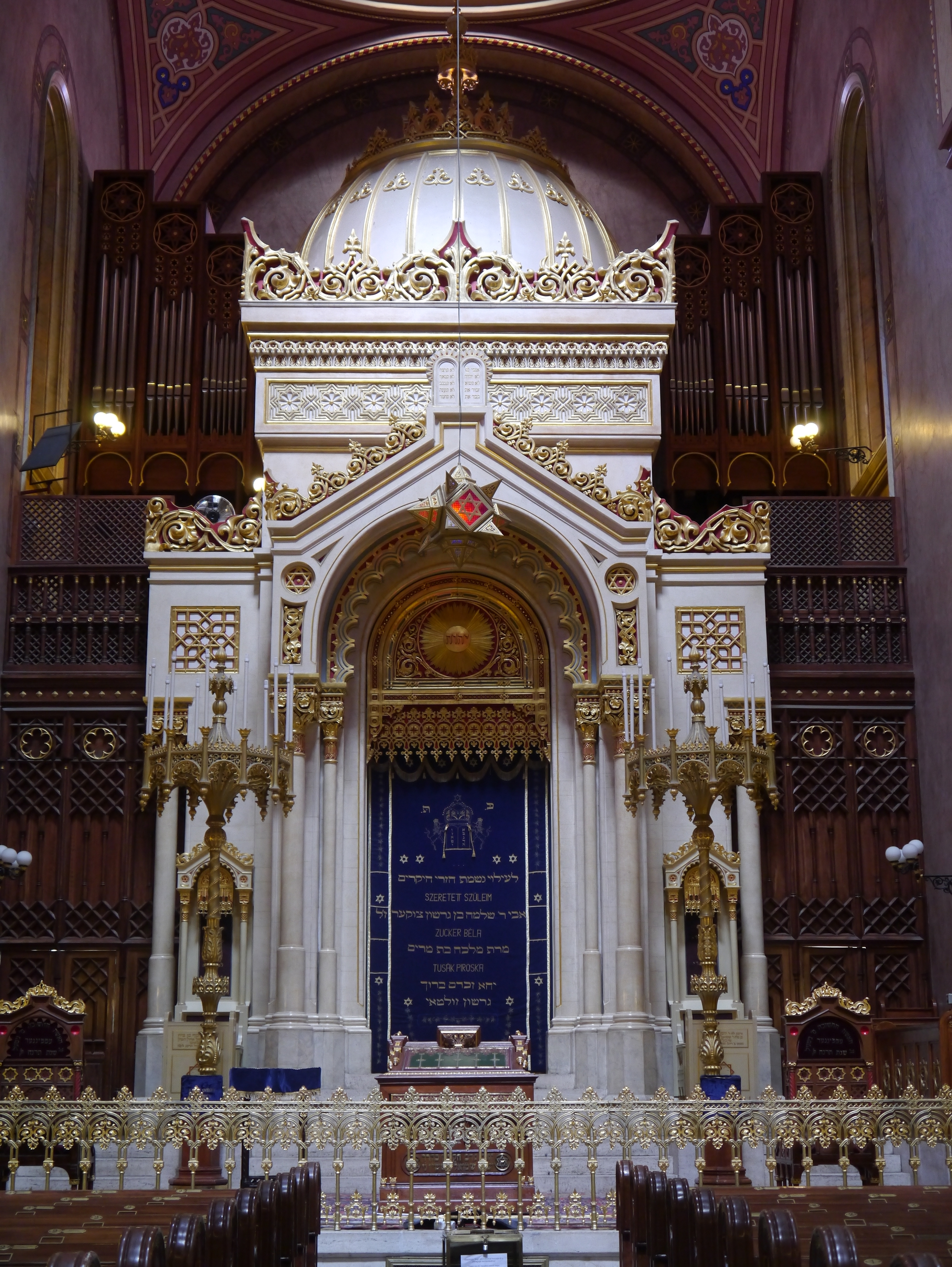
Torah ark of the Dohány Street Synagogue, built in 1854

A Torah ark (also known as the hekhal, Hebrew: היכל, or aron qodesh, אֲרוֹן קׄדֶש) is an ornamental chamber in the synagogue that houses the Torah scrolls.

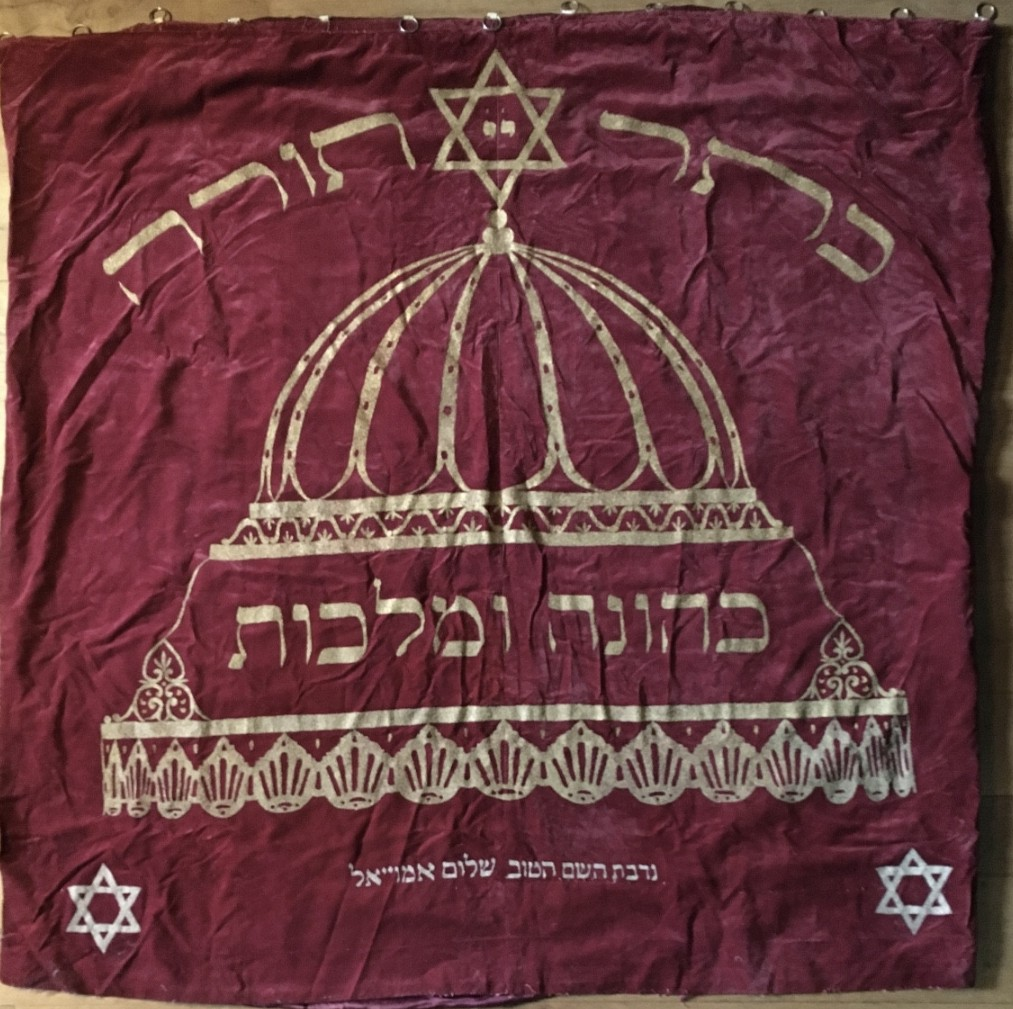
Portuguese Sephardic parochet covering a Torah ark, silk and metallic embroidery, c. 1760–1770

== History ==
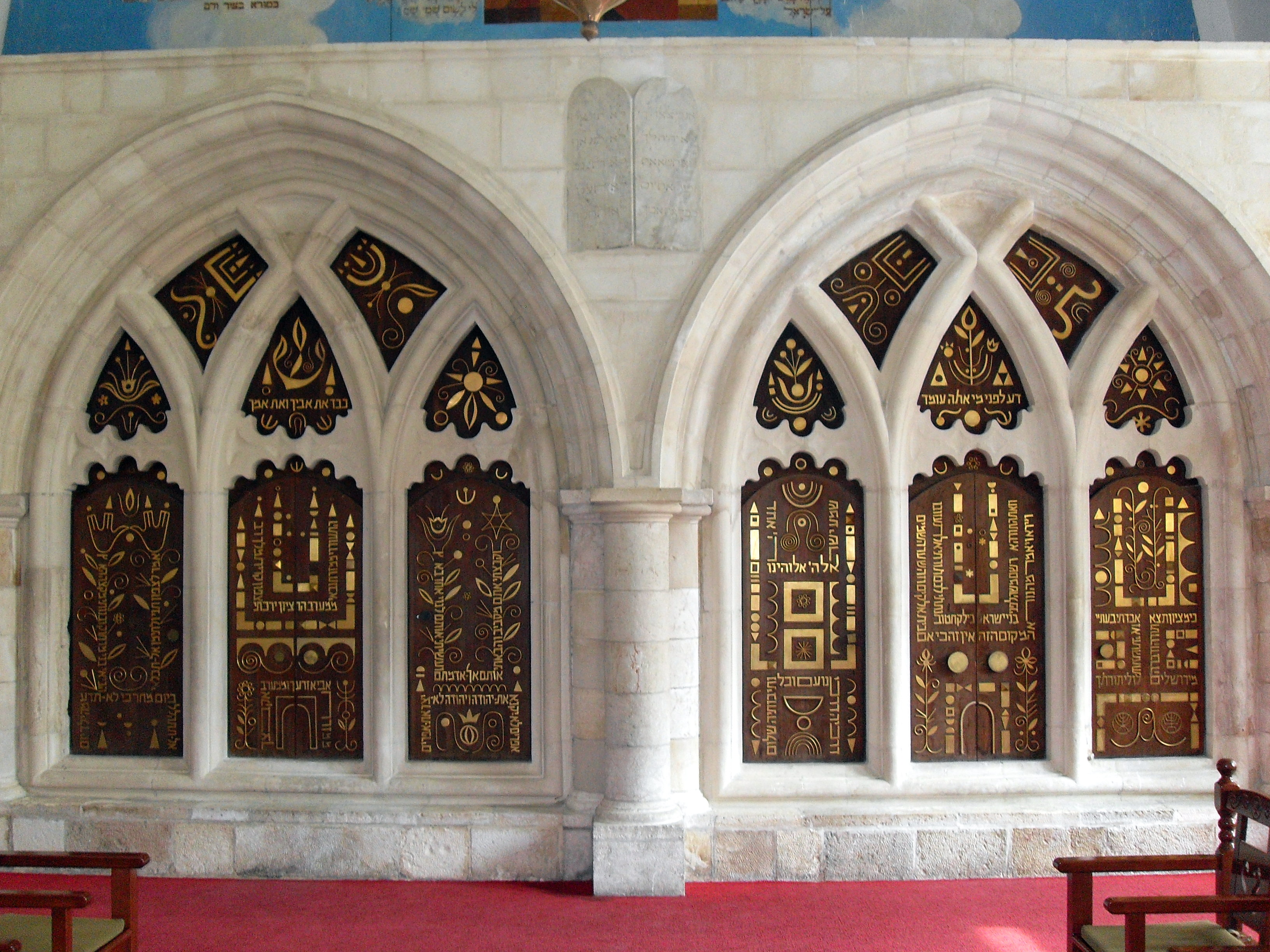
Arks in the Yochanan ben Zakai Synagogue in Old Jerusalem. The building was originally constructed in the 17th century.

The ark is also known as the ark of law, or in Hebrew the Aron Kodesh (אָרוֹן קׄדֶש) or aron ha-Kodesh ('holy ark') in Ashkenazi communities and as the Hekhal ('sanctuary') among Sefardi communities. The name Aron Kodesh is a reference to the Ark of the Covenant, which was stored in the Holy of Holies in the inner sanctuaries of both the ancient Tabernacle and the Temple in Jerusalem. Similarly, Hekhál (הֵיכָל 'palace'; also written hechal, echal, heichal or Echal Kodesh—mainly among Balkan Sephardim) was used in the same time period to refer to the inner sanctuary. The hekhal contained the Menorah, Altar of Incense and Table of the Showbread.

== Customs and location ==
In some ancient synagogues, such as the fifth-century synagogue in Susya, the Torah scroll was not placed inside the synagogue at all, but in a room adjacent to it, signifying that the sacredness of the synagogue does not come from the ark but from its being a house of prayer. The Torah was brought into the synagogue for reading purposes.

In synagogues outside of Jerusalem, the ark is placed in a chamber that is in a recess in the wall, facing Jerusalem, and worshipers face this direction when reciting prayers of the service such as the Amidah.

The ark is often closed with a parochet ("curtain") placed either outside the doors of the Holy Ark (Ashkenazi and Mizrachi custom) or inside the doors of the ark (Spanish and Portuguese and Moroccan or Sephardic custom). The parochet is an ornate cloth that resembles the same cloth that was once on the golden Ark. Both the aron kodesh and parochet are usually inscribed with verses from Judaic holy scripture. These inscriptions generally display the purity of the synagogue or the celebrated uniqueness of the scrolls placed within.

Jewish law states the ark is the second holiest part of a synagogue after the Torah scrolls themselves. Customs call for the congregation when reciting key prayers (such as Avinu Malkeinu – "Our Father Our King", in many communities), to stand and face the ark, on fasting days, the Ten Days of Repentance between Rosh Hashana and Yom Kippur (also called the High Holidays), and for many piyyutim (poems, songs, etc.) recited during High Holy Day services. Many who partake in these customs consider it respectful to stand as long as the ark is open and the Torah is being moved to the reading table (or podium). However, there is no actual obligation (law) to remain standing when the ark is open, but it is a universally accepted custom. In addition to this custom is the custom to never turn ones back towards the ark even when leaving the sanctuary. Instead one must back out until they have left the vicinity of the ark, and only then can they turn their back (by the Kotel which is considered as a synagogue itself, this custom also exists).

== Evolution ==
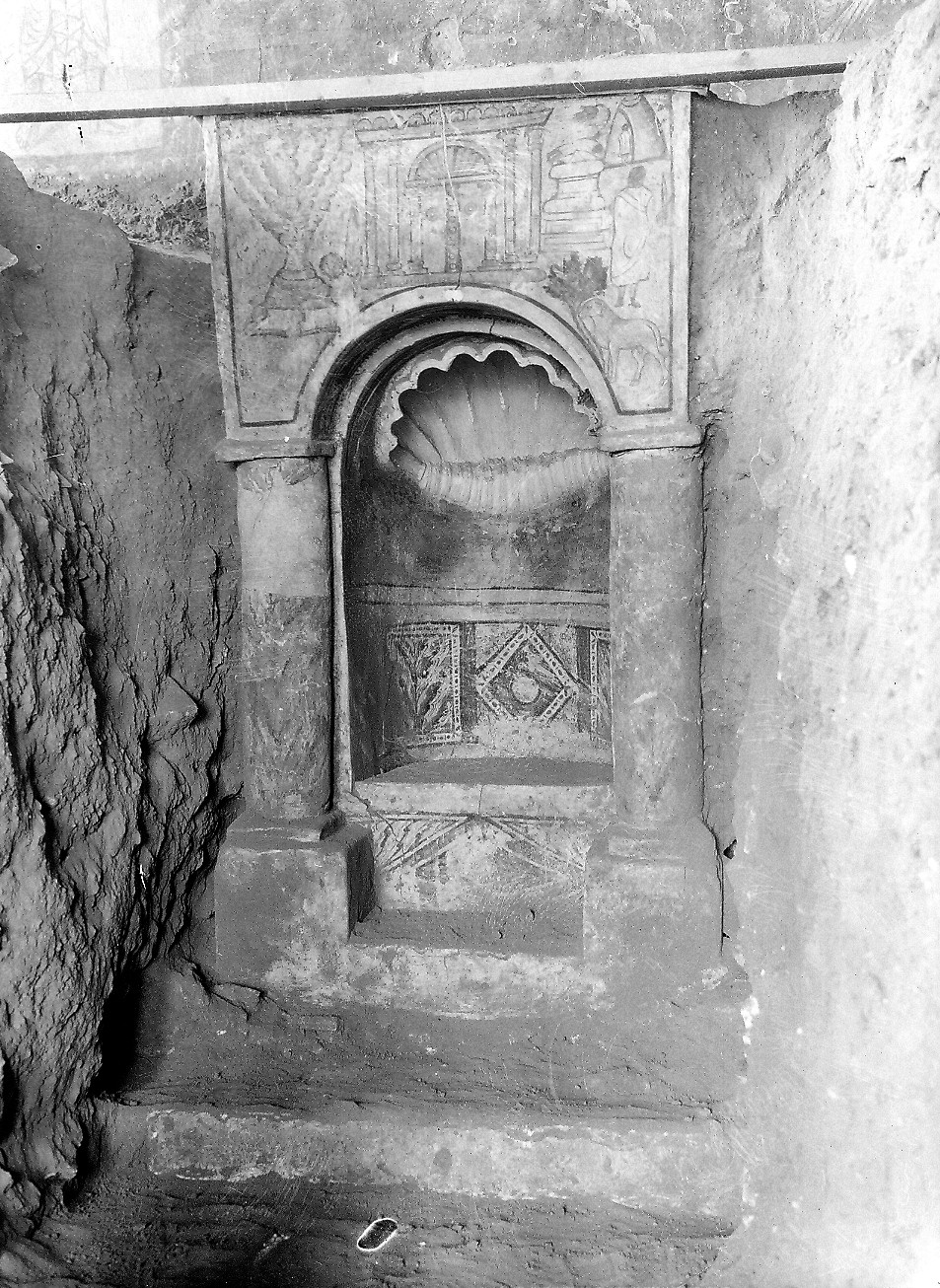
Photograph of an aedicula (Torah Shrine) in the west wall of the synagogue at Dura-Europos (Salahiyeh) in Syria

Originally, the scrolls were placed in moveable containers that were risen up. The more permanent placement of the ark was designed as the tribes settled and built temples. As early as 245 CE in the synagogue of Dura-Europos a slit within the holy wall (or wall facing Jerusalem) was created for the ark. In ancient times, the cloth wrapped scrolls are believed to have been placed flat within a low wooden box. Historical records or discoveries point to a variety of exterior designs becoming popular within the Jewish culture of the time. Archeologists found early Torah arks within the Jewish catacombs in Rome decorated with Pompeian frescoes, paintings, and graffiti.

Throughout Europe, in the Middle Ages, designs favored taller arks. In the 14th and 15th centuries, Spanish and German Jewish Hebrew texts depict a new design. These texts placed the scrolls inside the ark standing upright, decorated, and wrapped with the appropriate cloth and covers. A Sephardic synagogue based in Amsterdam (c. 1675) contains a baroque style ark, which takes up the entire width of the central hub of the building. The Sephardic synagogue based as far north as London (c. 1701) adopted the design as mainstream. In this period, most synagogues in Europe were designed with the reading table (or podium) in the center of the building. The ark was placed on the Eastern wall, so the congregation would be facing Jerusalem when praying.

During the 18th century, German synagogues incorporated a baroque style design. Decorative features such as pilasters, columns, and vases became a standard practice. Wood and stone carvers in Eastern Europe began to employ unique local craft designs in synagogue architecture. Folk art and animals were popular design features added to arks created during this period. Early designs in the United States featured built-in arks in synagogues, such as the 1763 Touro Synagogue in Newport, Rhode Island, which was inspired by a trend of grandeur in architectural design. The United States Jewish community continued to favor the grand or classical design style until around 1840. In the mid-1800s the Moorish style synagogues influenced by the Oriental style became the latest fashion in synagogue design. The Oriental ark design included sliding doors and a curved forepart. The most notable features of this era included domes and arches that contained geometrical polychrome designs. Many synagogue styles from the 16th to the 19th century can be seen across American and throughout Europe. However, after World War II, the ark design evolved into an art form. New experimental forms and materials were employed in the making of modern arks based on the unique interests of the community commissioning the ark.

== See also ==
- Dohány Street Synagogue
- Spanish Synagogue (Prague)
- Synagogue of El Tránsito
- Jewish culture
- Church tabernacle

== Gallery ==
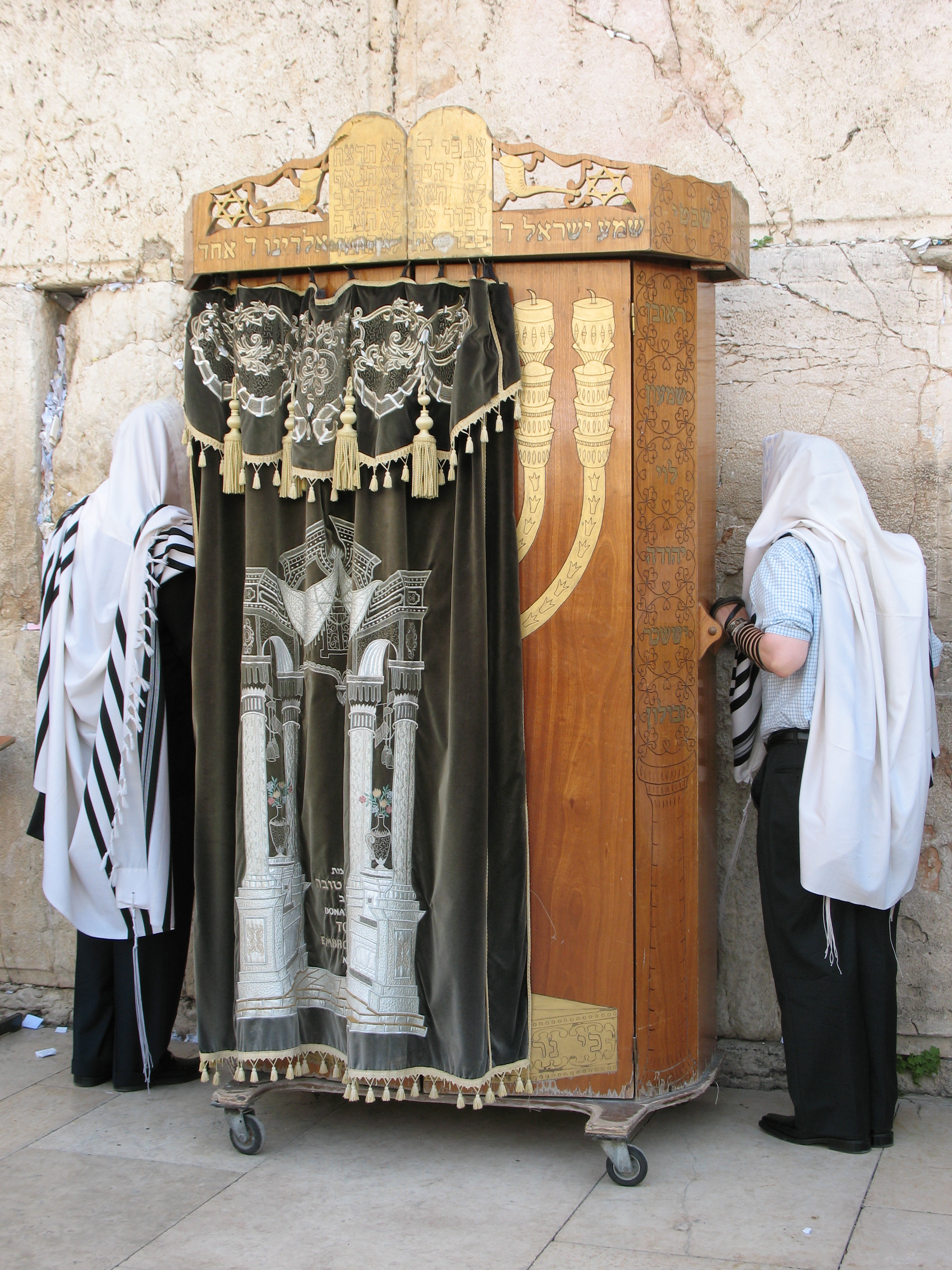
A mobile ark at the Western Wall in Jerusalem

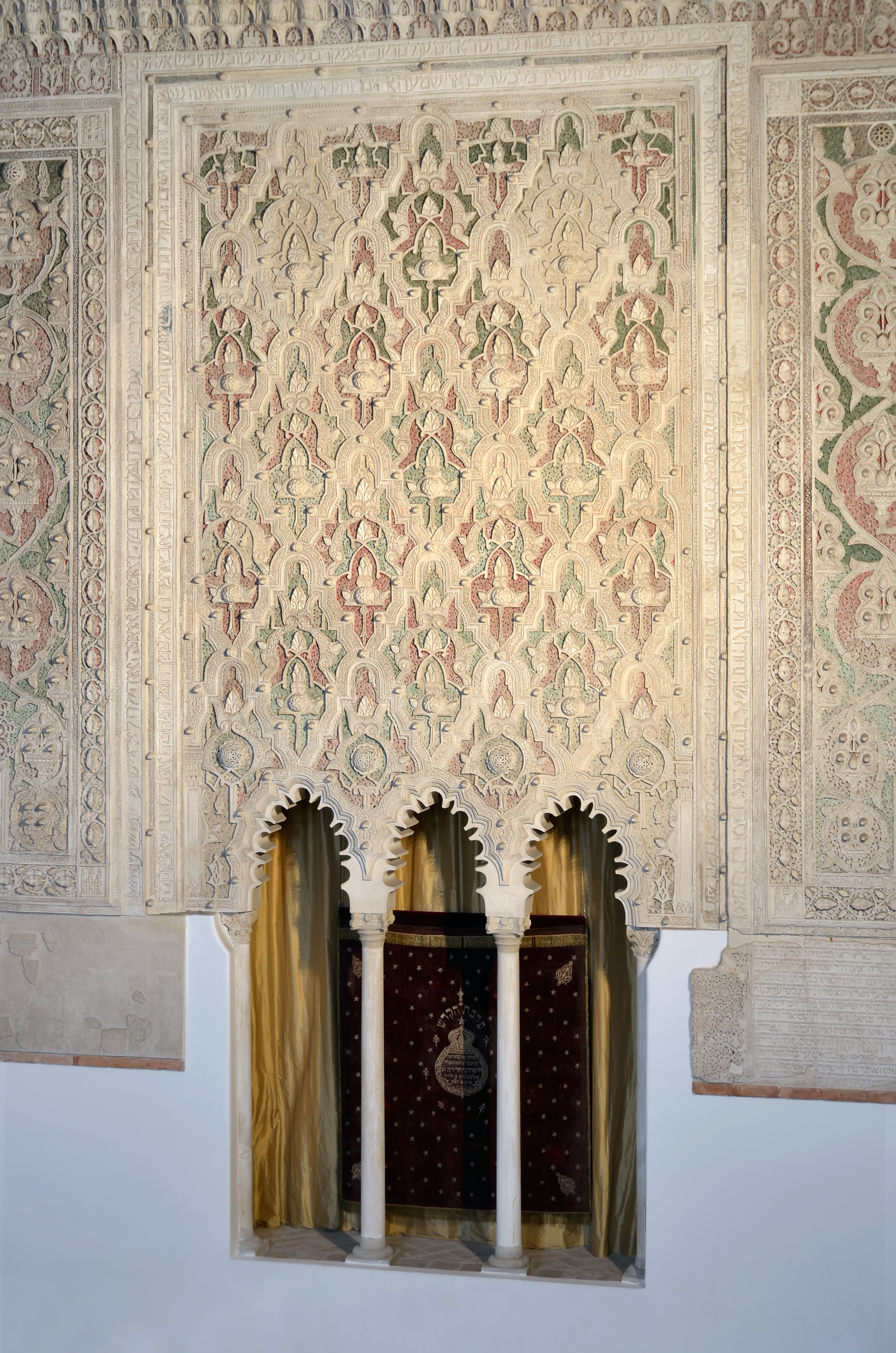
Ark of the 14th century Sephardic Synagogue of El Tránsito in Toledo, Spain

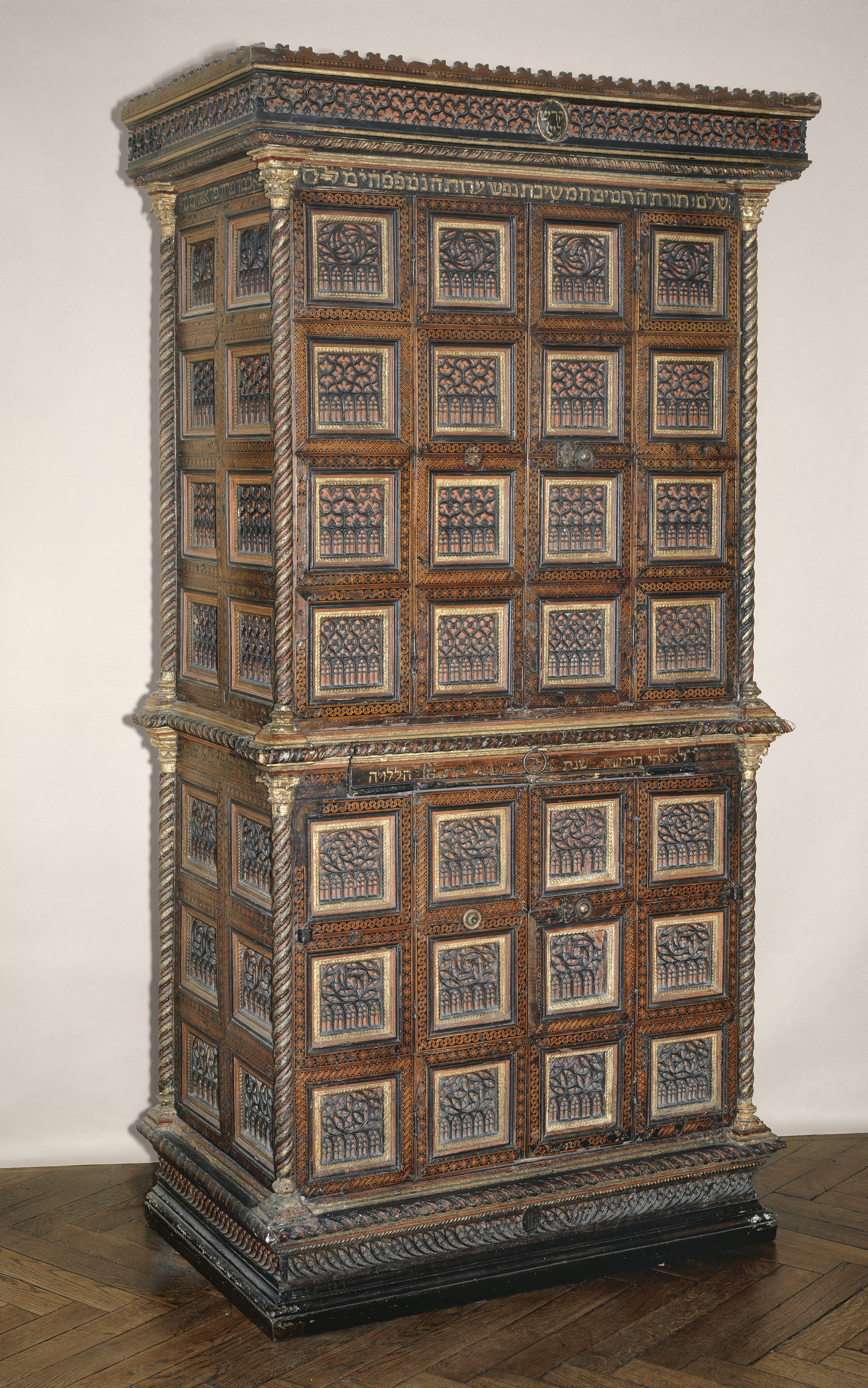
Freestanding ark made in Modena, Italy in 1472

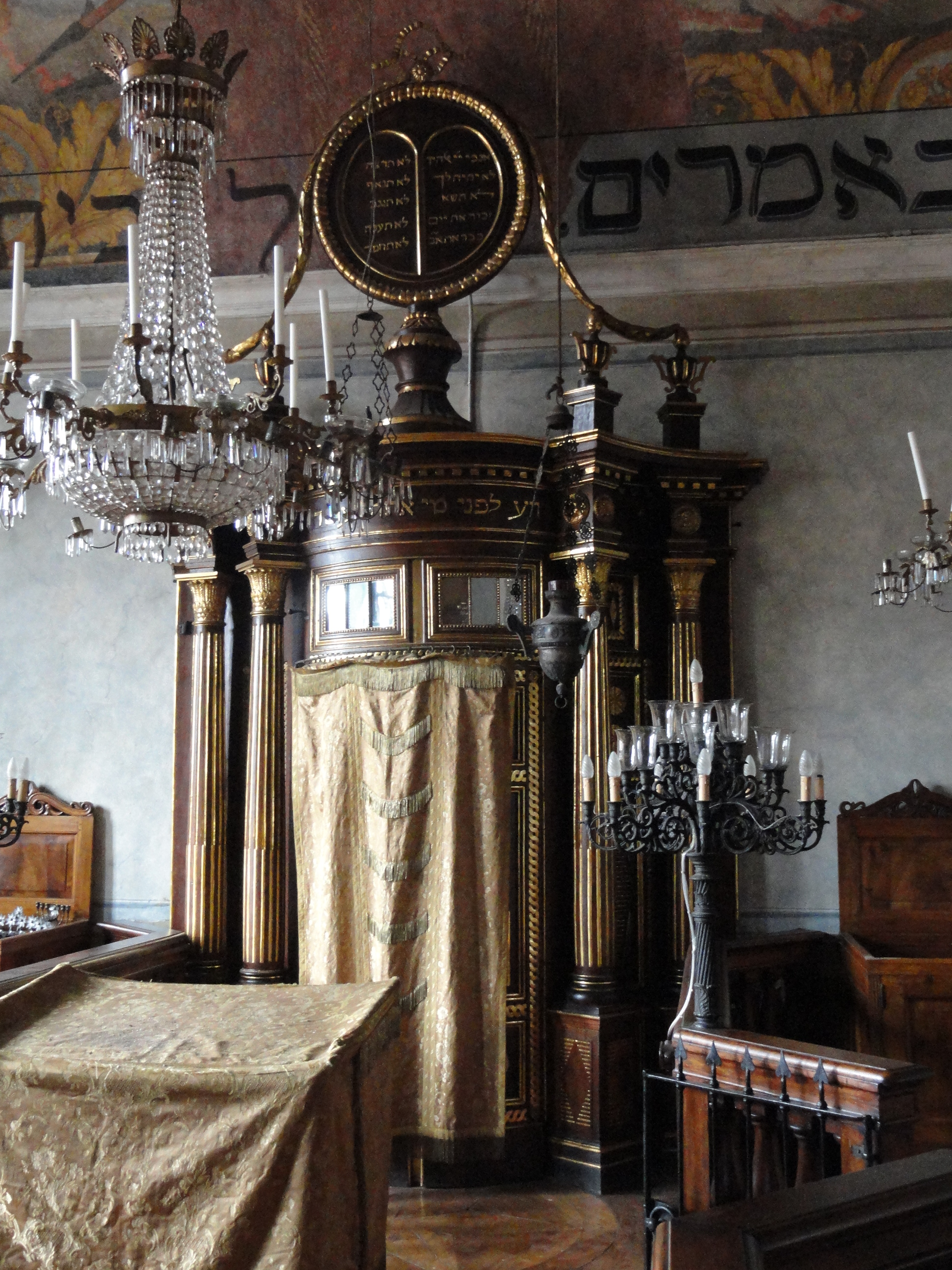
Ark in the 17th century Saluzzo Synagogue in Saluzzo, Italy

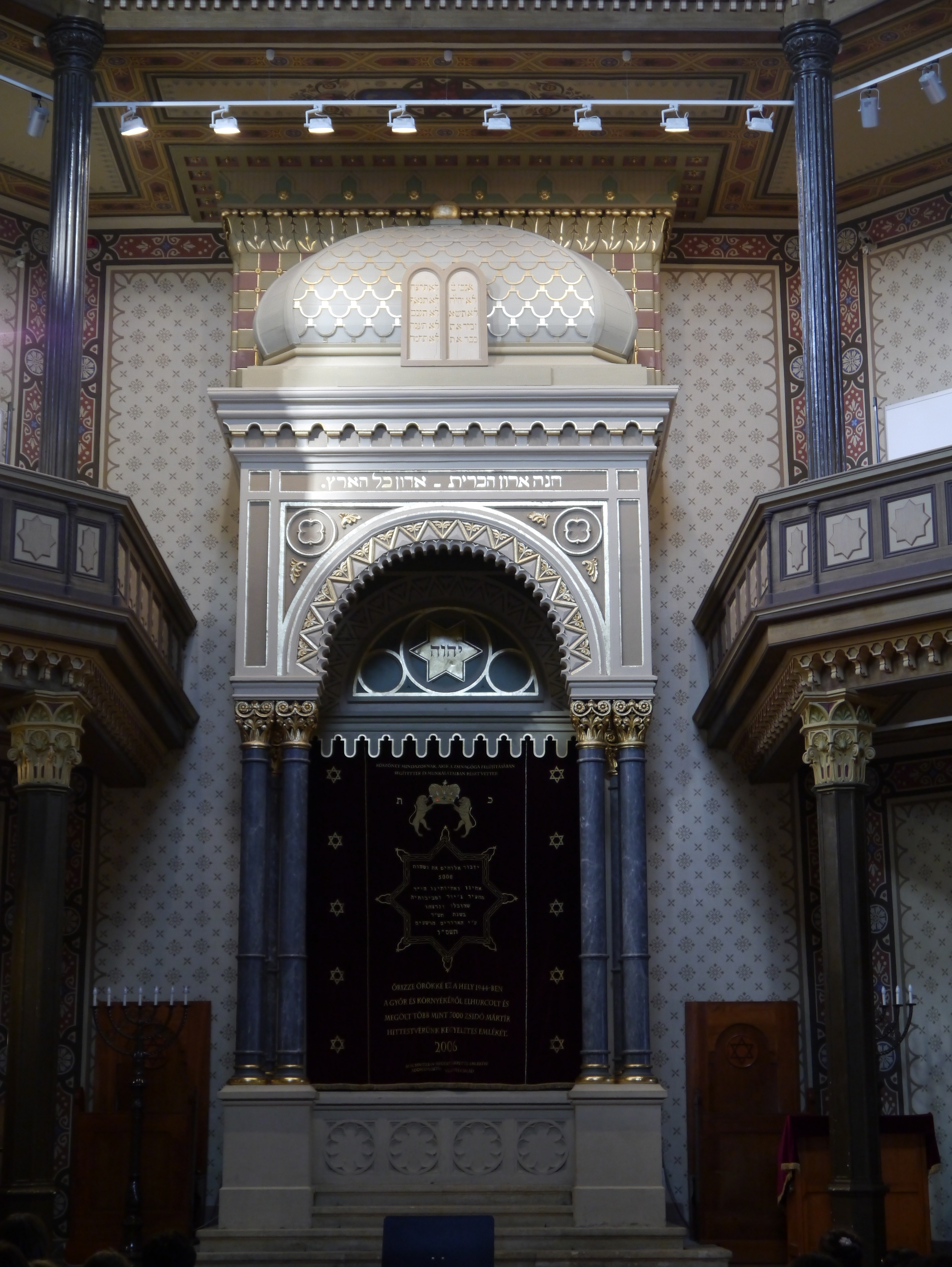
Ark in the 1870 Synagogue of Győr in Győr, Hungary

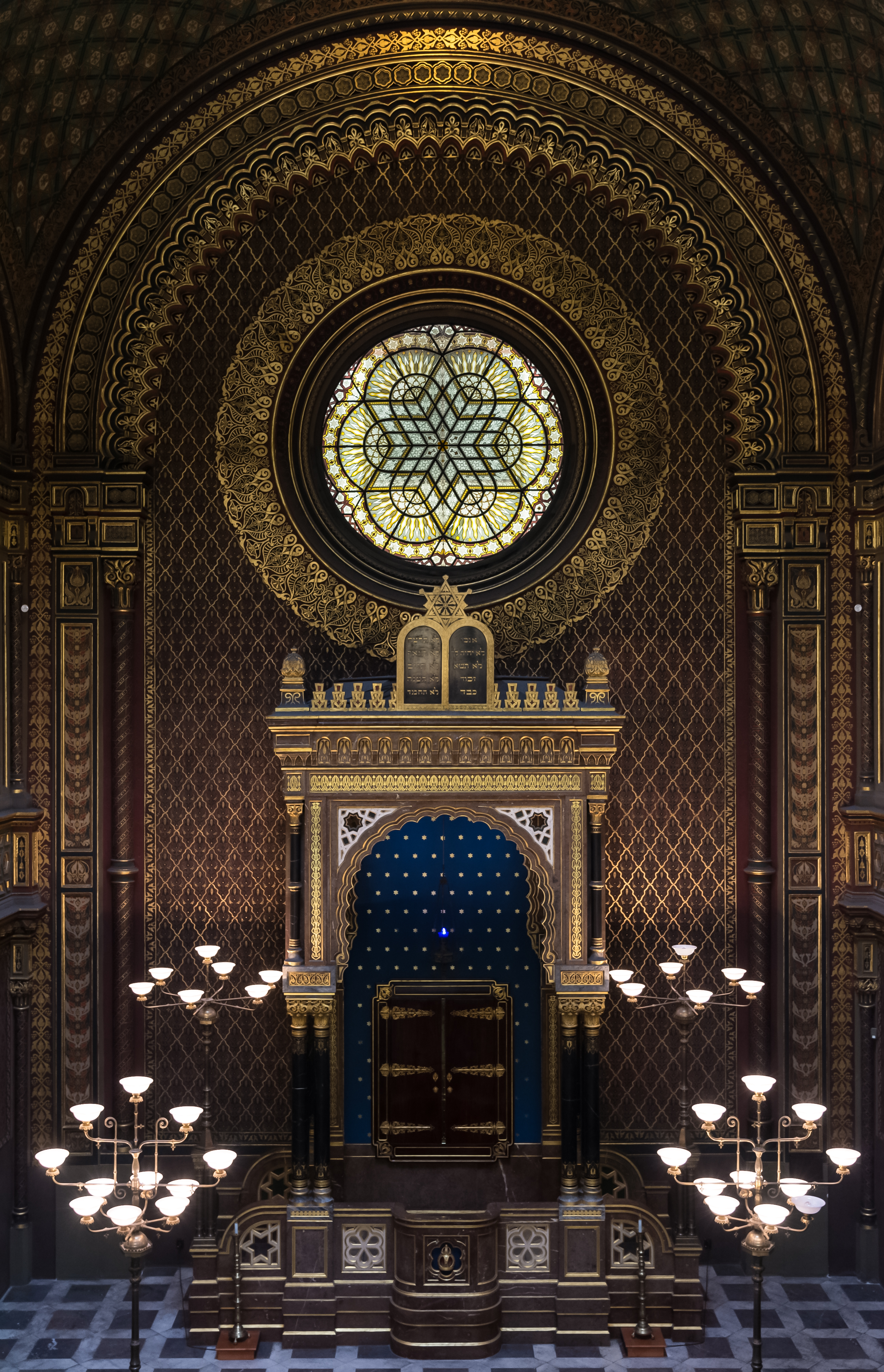
The ark of the 19th century Spanish Synagogue of Prague, Czech Republic

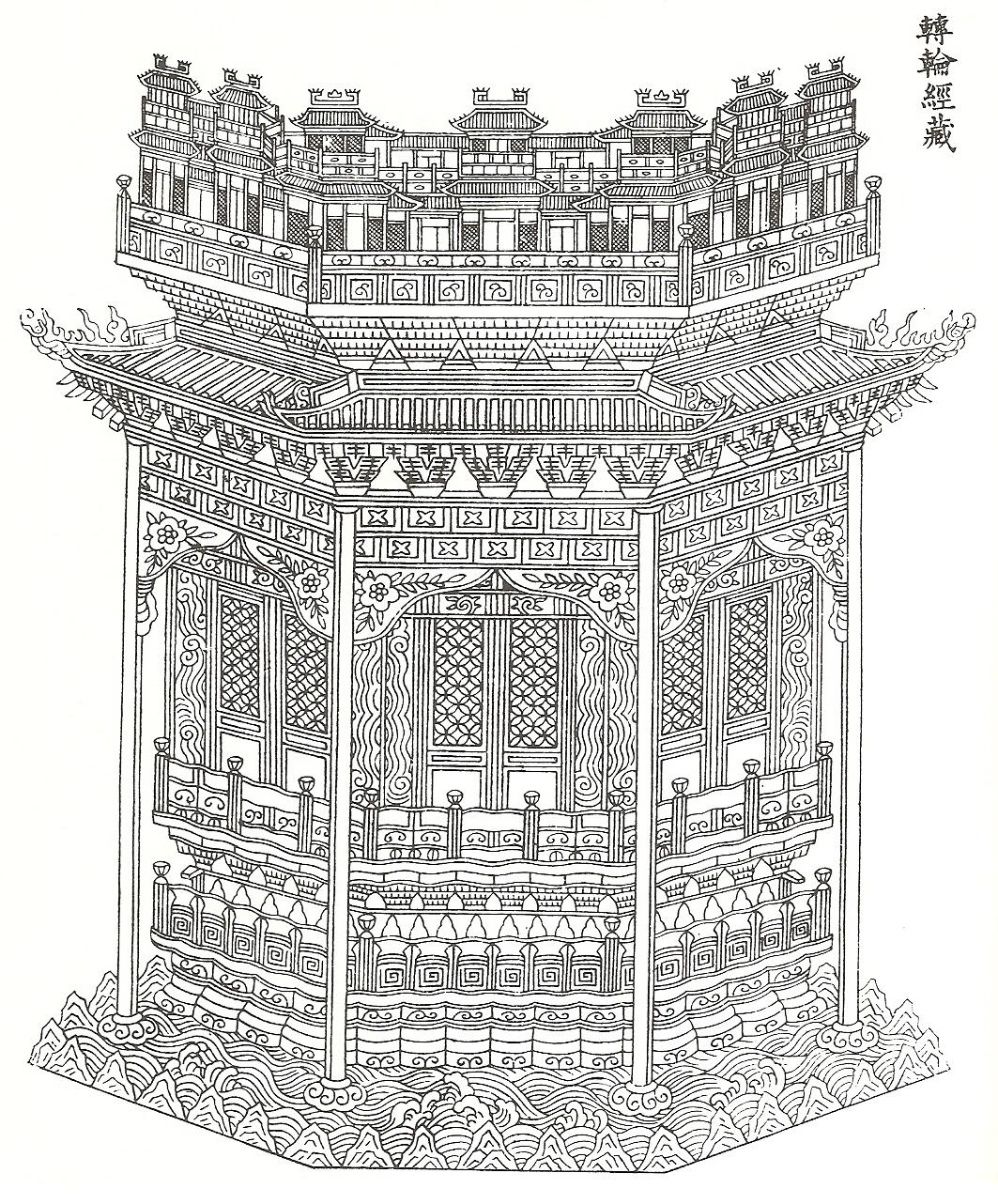
Ark based on a Chinese Buddhist design used by the Kaifeng Jews of China

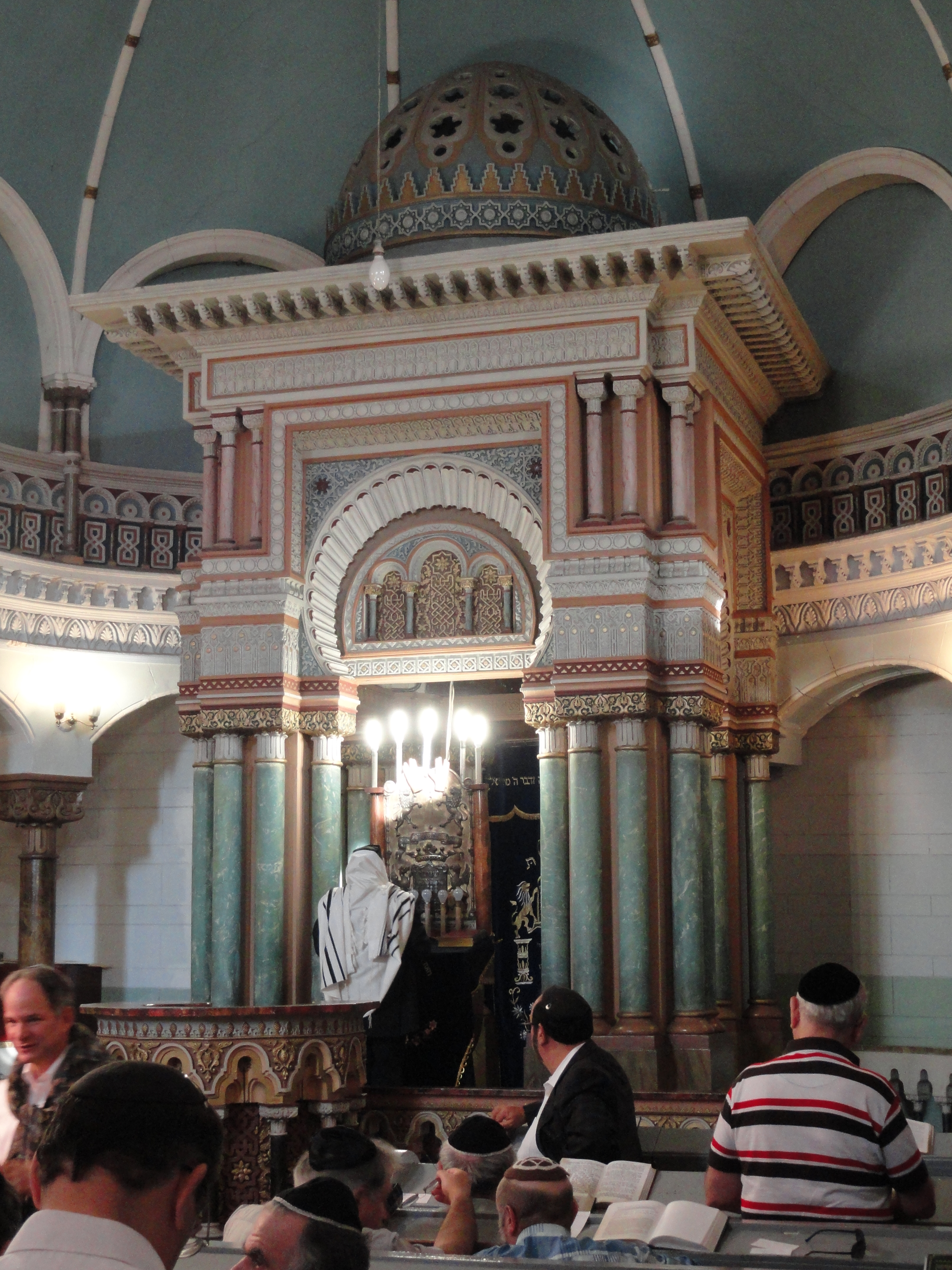
Ark in the 1903 Choral Synagogue in Vilnius, Lithuania

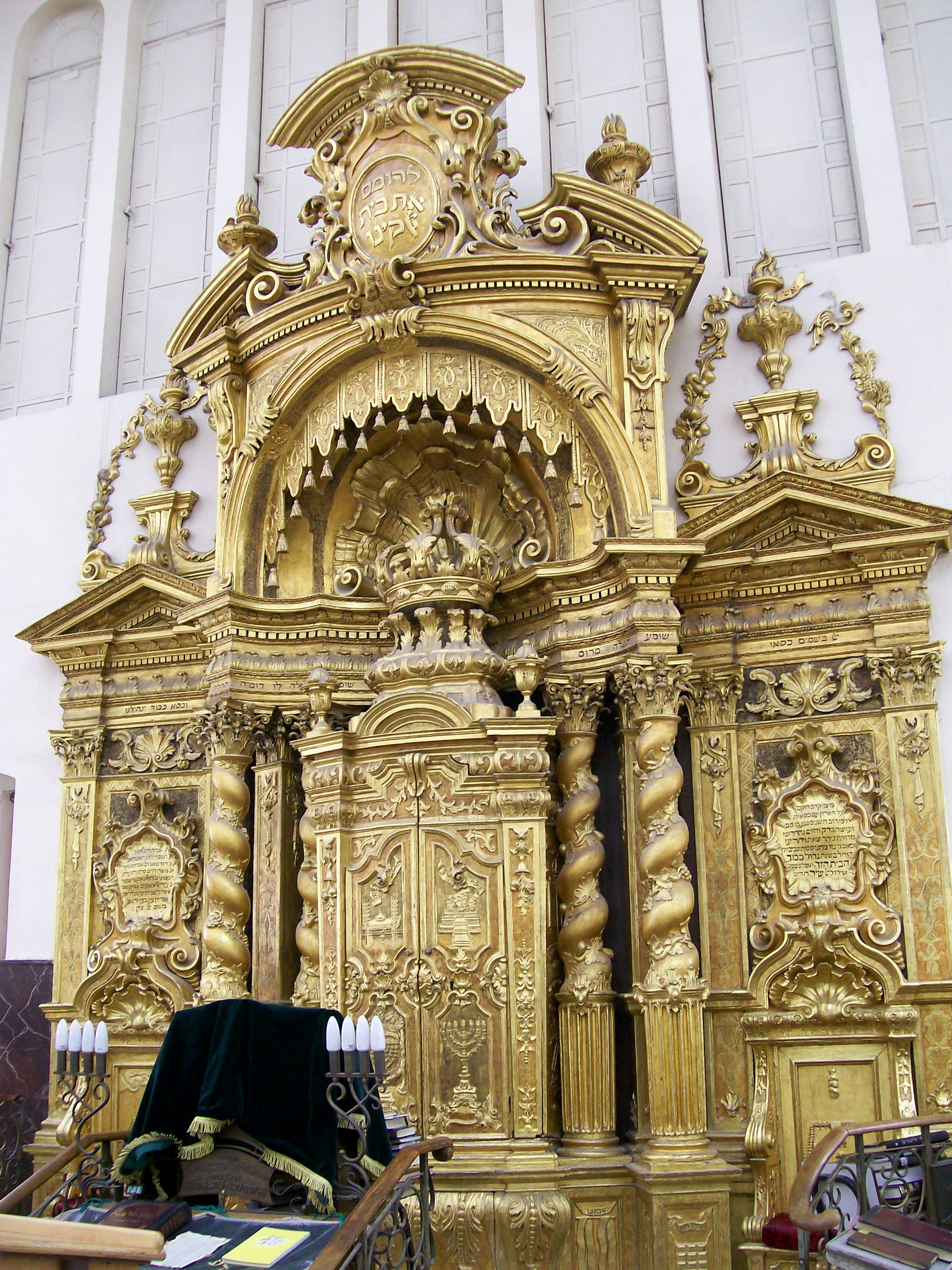
The ark of the early 20th century Ponevezh Yeshiva in Bnei Brak, Israel

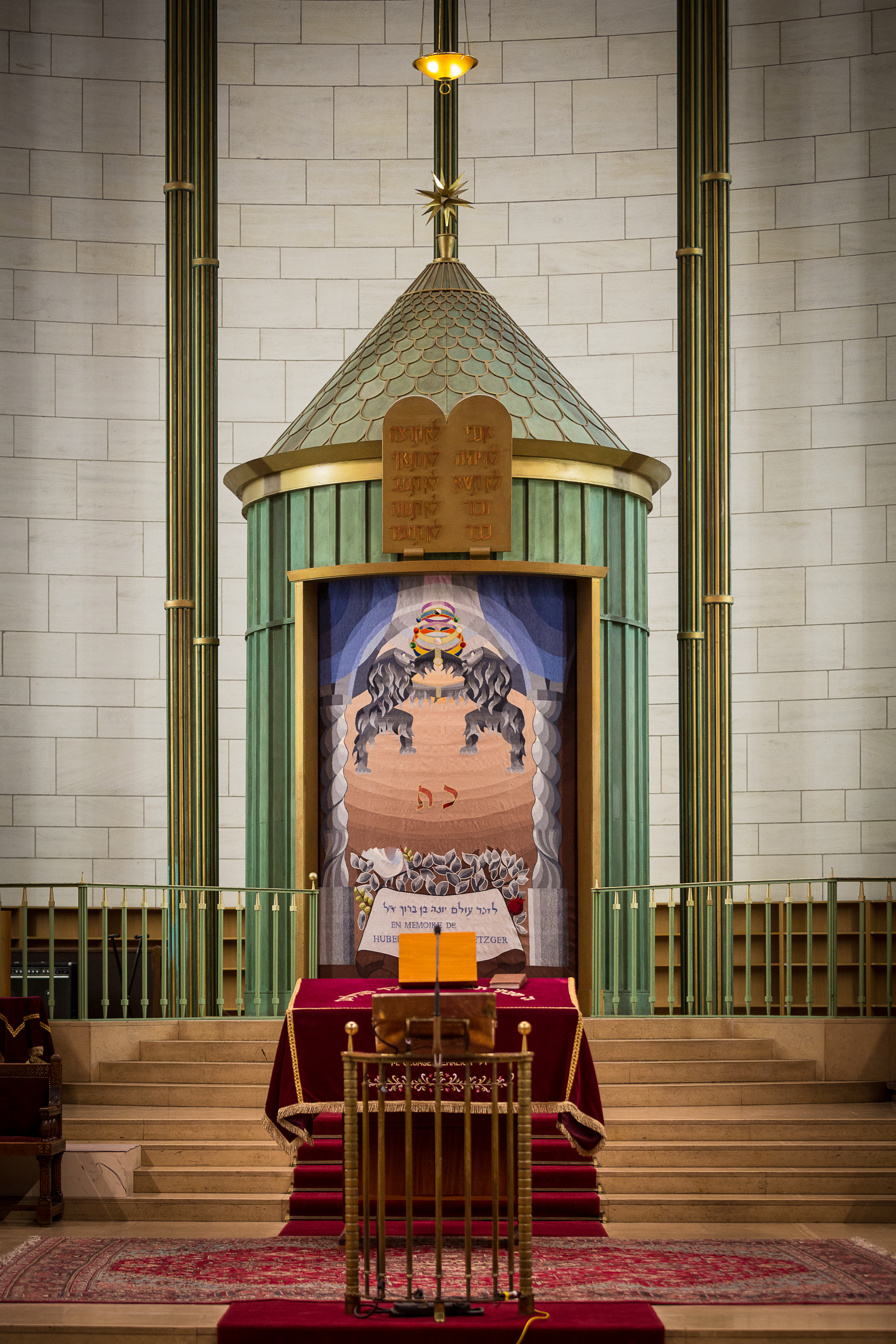
Ark of the Grande synagogue de la Paix, constructed in the 1950s

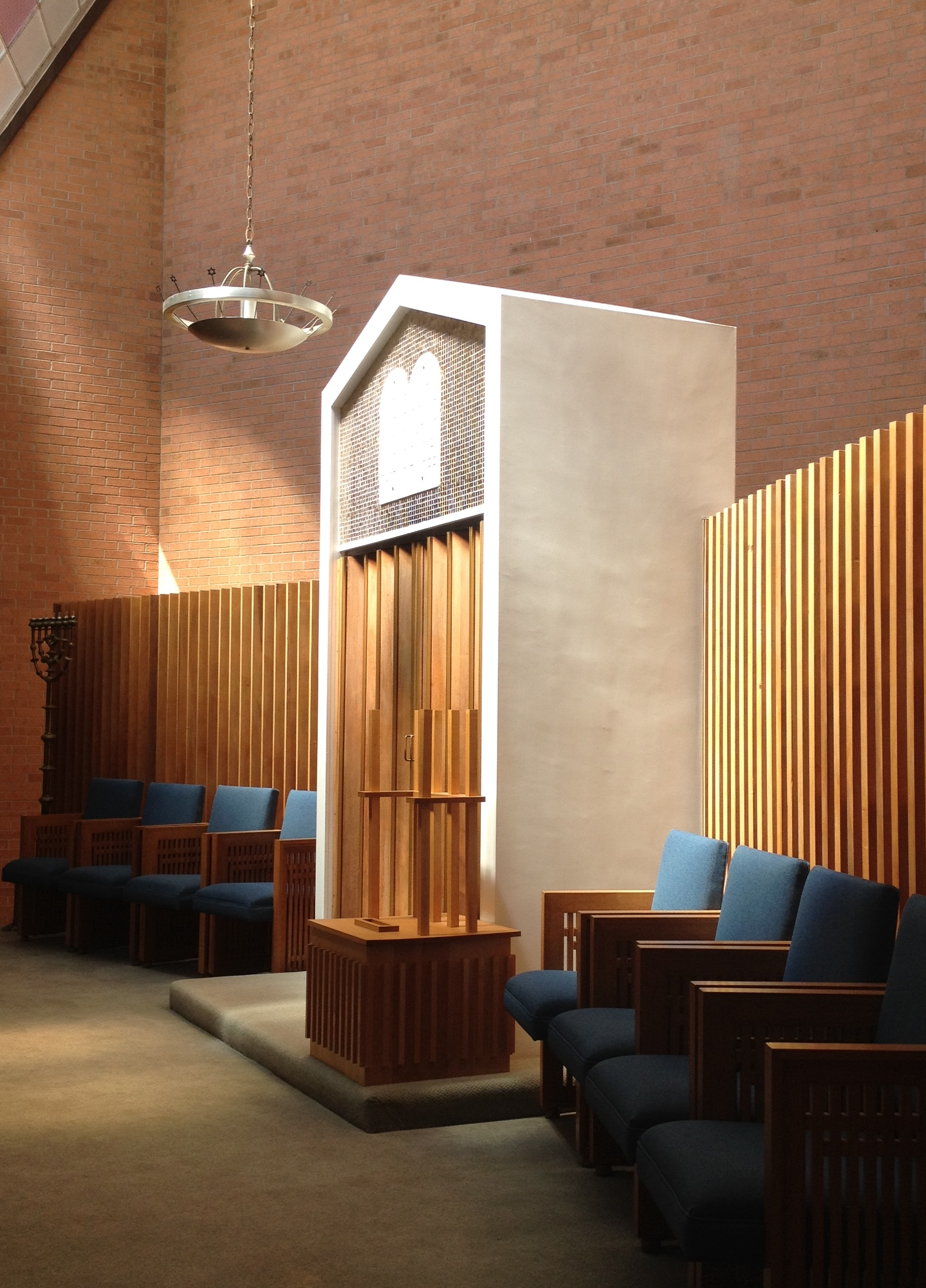
Mid-century modern ark from the 1950s in the Congregation Gemiluth Chassodim in Alexandria, Louisiana, US

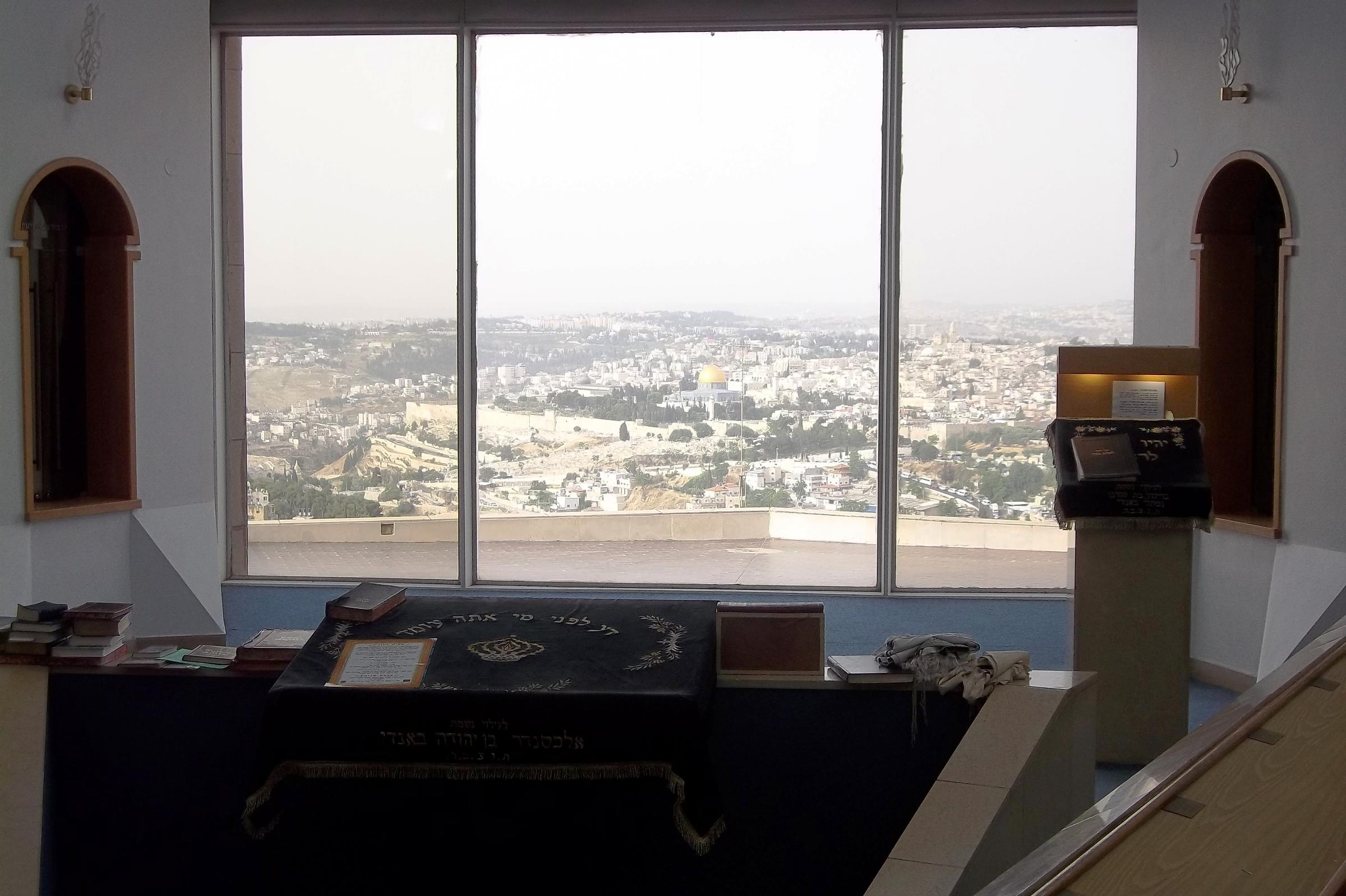
The 1981 Hecht Synagogue uses two alcoves on either side of a window as arks

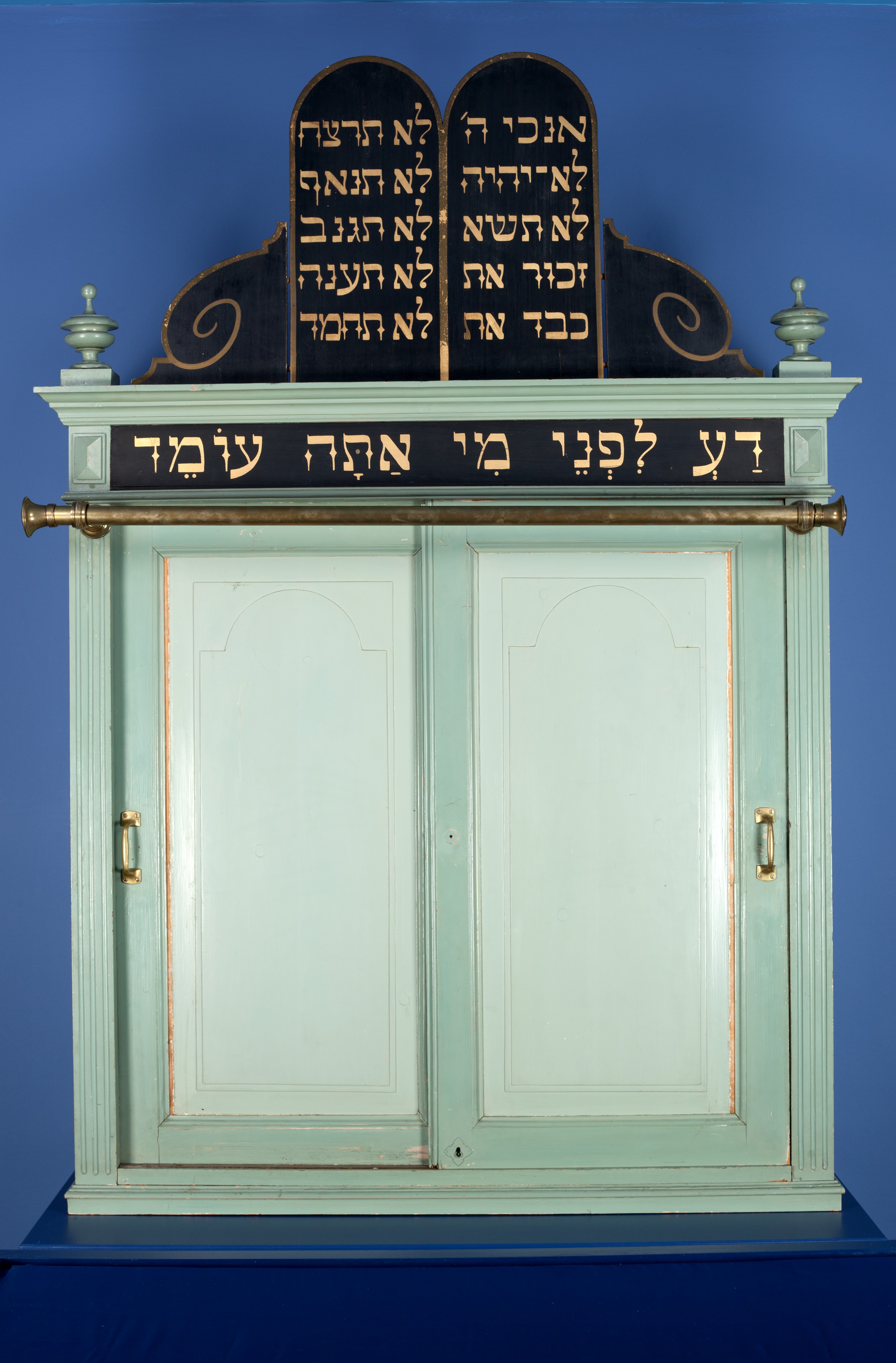
19th century Torah shrine from the Jewish Community of Solothurn, Jewish Museum of Switzerland

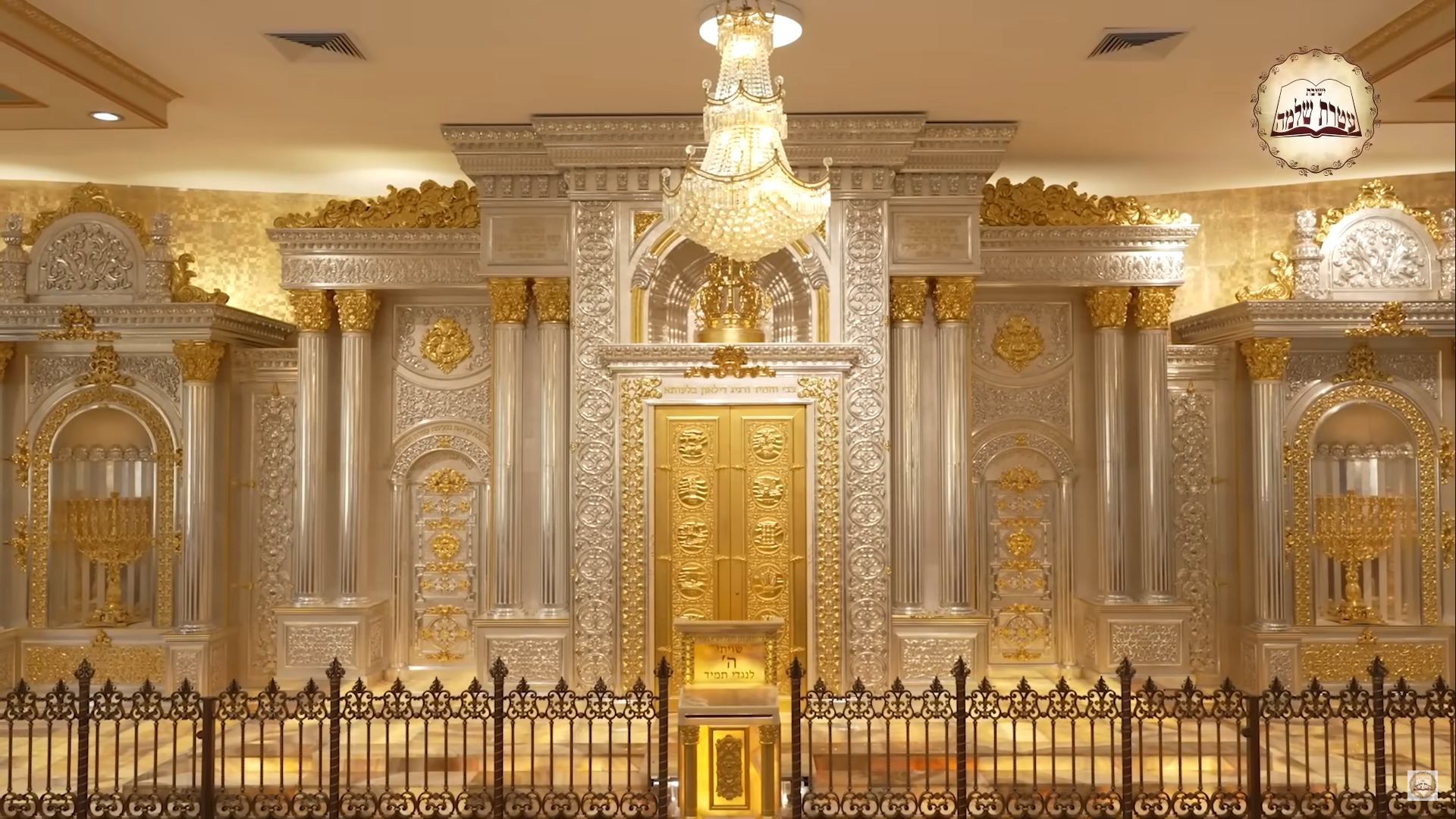
The ark at Yeshivas Ateres Shlomo in Rishon LeZion, Israel, the largest ark in the world
