= Palazzo San Gervasio =

- Comune
- Comune di Palazzo San Gervasio
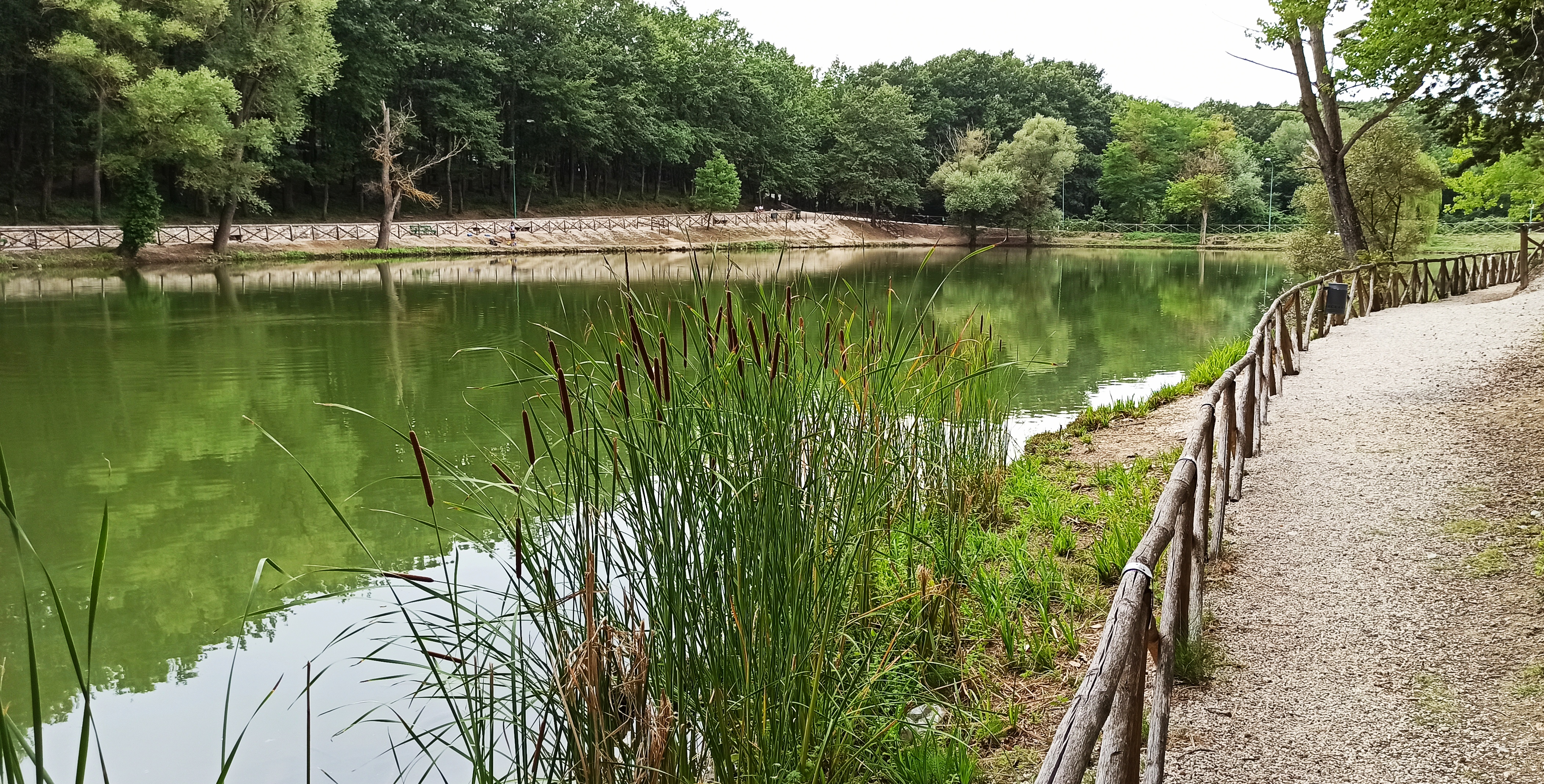
- View of Palazzo San Gervasio

- Location within Italy Location within Basilicata
- Coordinates: basilicata 40°56′N 15°59′E
- Country: Italy
- Region: Basilicata
- Province: Potenza (PZ)

Government
  - Mayor: Michele Mastro

Area
  - Total: 62 km^{2} (24 sq mi)
- Elevation: 483 m (1,585 ft)

Population (31 December 2017)
  - Total: 4,825
  - Density: 78/km^{2} (200/sq mi)
- Demonym: Palazzesi
- Time zone: UTC+1 (CET)
  - Summer (DST): UTC+2 (CEST)
- Postal code: 85026
- Dialing code: 0972
- ISTAT code: 076057
- Patron saint: St. Anthony of Padua
- Saint day: June 13
- Website: Official website

Palazzo San Gervasio (Lucano: Palàzze) is a small agricultural town and comune in the province of Potenza, in the Southern Italian region of Basilicata. It is bounded by the comuni (Municipalities) of Acerenza, Banzi, Forenza, Genzano di Lucania, Maschito, Spinazzola, and Venosa.

While the regional Lucanian dialect is still spoken amongst the older inhabitants, it has largely been replaced because the younger generations have been taught the standard form of Italian in school.

The town was allegedly founded in the early Middle Ages, after the nearby town of Banzi was destroyed by a Saracen attack.
