= Maschito =

- Comune
- Comune di Maschito
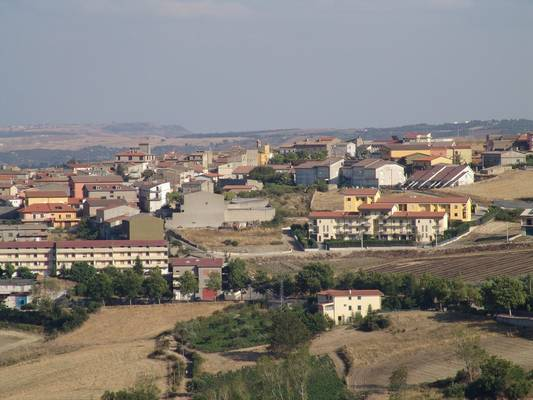
- View of Maschito

- Coat of arms

- Location of Maschito in Italy Maschito (Basilicata)
- Coordinates: 40°55′N 15°50′E
- Country: Italy
- Region: Basilicata
- Province: Potenza (PZ)
- Frazioni: Caggiano, Cancada, Cantarella, Casano, Cerentino, Cerentino-Settanni, Cesina, Fontana d'Argento, Manes, Monte Calvello, Oreficicchio, Piano del Moro, Piano della Trinità, Serra della Nocelle, Sterpara

Government
  - Mayor: Antonio Mastrodonato

Area
  - Total: 45 km^{2} (17 sq mi)
- Elevation: 594 m (1,949 ft)

Population (2007)
  - Total: 1,834
  - Density: 41/km^{2} (110/sq mi)
- Demonym: Maschitani
- Time zone: UTC+1 (CET)
  - Summer (DST): UTC+2 (CEST)
- Postal code: 85020
- Dialing code: 0972
- ISTAT code: 076047
- Patron saint: Prophet Elijah
- Saint day: 20 July
- Website: Official website

Maschito (Arbëreshë Albanian: Mashqiti; Lucano: Maschìte) is a town and comune of the province of Potenza, in the Basilicata region of southern Italy. Like other towns in the Vulture area, Maschito was repopulated by Albanian refugees after the occupation of Albania by the Ottoman Empire.

== Geography ==
Located Northeast of Basilicata, it is a small town covering a hill named Mustafà, about 594 metres (1,949 ft) above sea level. It is bounded by the comuni (Municipalities), of Forenza, Ginestra, Palazzo San Gervasio, Venosa.

Maschito has a typical Mediterranean climate with slight mountain characteristics, because of its distance from the sea.

== History ==
Maschito was founded in 1467 by King Ferdinand I of Naples, when the Albanian hero Skanderbeg was sent with numerous troops to fight the Angevin pretenders to the throne of Naples and the Barons. The capture of Kruja by the Turks and the abandonment of Shkodër (1478–79) led to the first migration of Albanians (Arbëreshë) to Basilicata.

In 1533, when the Fortress of Koroni fell the Albanian refugees of the area were allowed to settle areas of the Kingdom of Naples, including Maschito. At that time the territory of Maschito belonged to the Bishop of Venosa and the Prior of Gerosolmitano of Bari.

By law, around November 17, 1539, the Notary Giacomo Citamiore of Venosa, and the Spanish viceroy of Naples, Pedro Álvarez de Toledo, ceded the aforementioned territory to Giovanni de Icis. The Albanians were obligated to pay one ducat a year from the annual income of each household, and 200 ducats extra a year if the number of homes increased by one.

== Economy ==
The economy is based on agriculture, especially grapes and olives.
