= Ginestra =

- Comune
- Comune di Ginestra
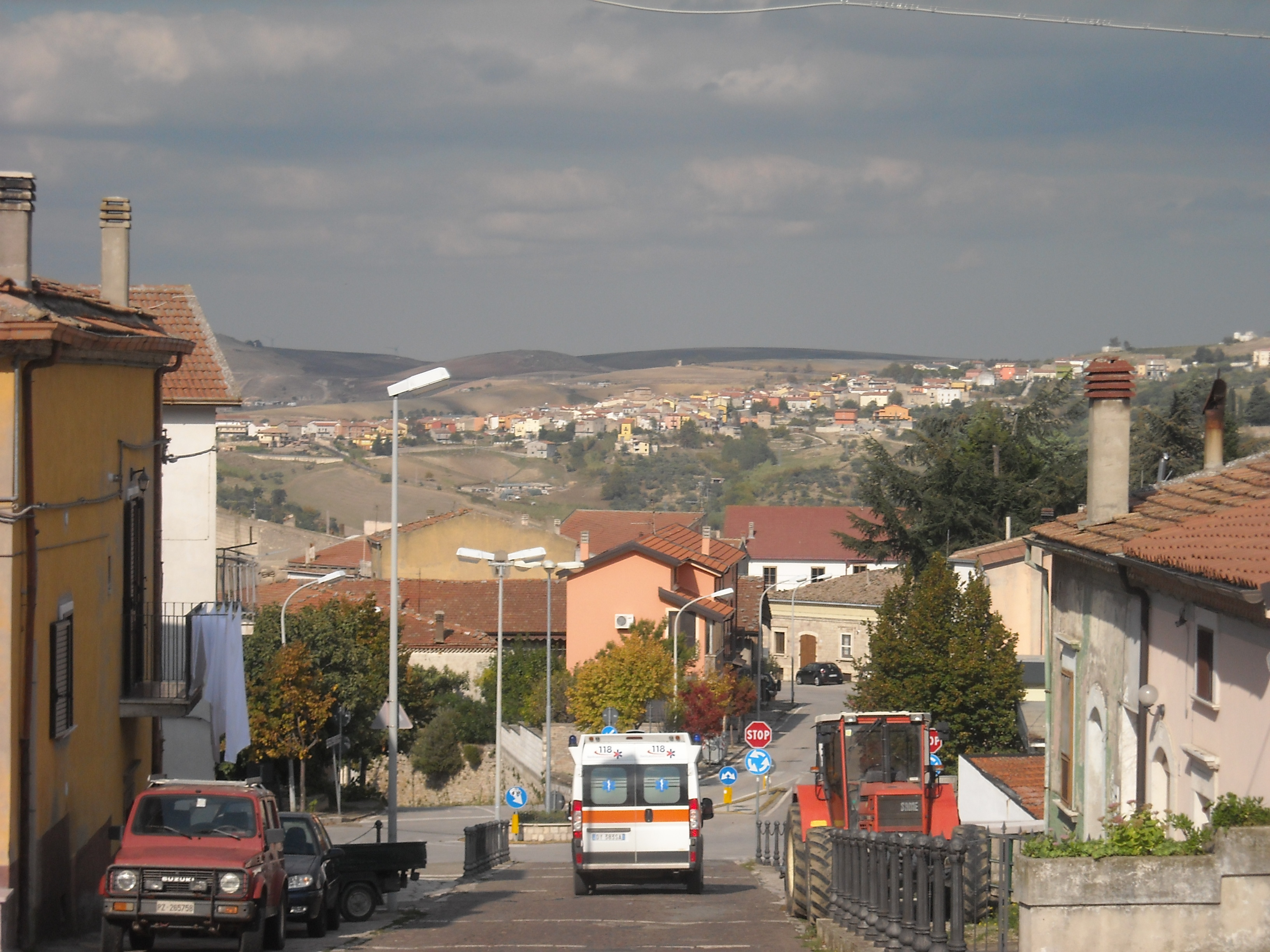
- View of Ginestra

- Location within Italy Location within Basilicata
- Coordinates: 40°56′N 15°44′E
- Country: Italy
- Region: Basilicata
- Province: Province of Potenza (PZ)

Government
  - Mayor: Giuseppe Pepice

Area
  - Total: 13 km^{2} (5.0 sq mi)
- Elevation: 546 m (1,791 ft)

Population (2018-01-01)
  - Total: 718
  - Density: 55/km^{2} (140/sq mi)
- Demonym: Ginestrini (Arbërisht: Zhurjanë)
- Time zone: UTC+1 (CET)
  - Summer (DST): UTC+2 (CEST)
- Postal code: 85020
- Dialing code: 0972
- ISTAT code: 076099
- Patron saint: Shen Merì i Kustandenopule
- Website: Official website

Ginestra (Arbëreshë Albanian: Zhura) is an Arbëreshë town and comune in the Province of Potenza, Basilicata, Italy. It is bounded by the comuni of Barile, Forenza, Maschito, Ripacandida, Venosa.
