= Venosa =

- Comune
- Città di Venosa
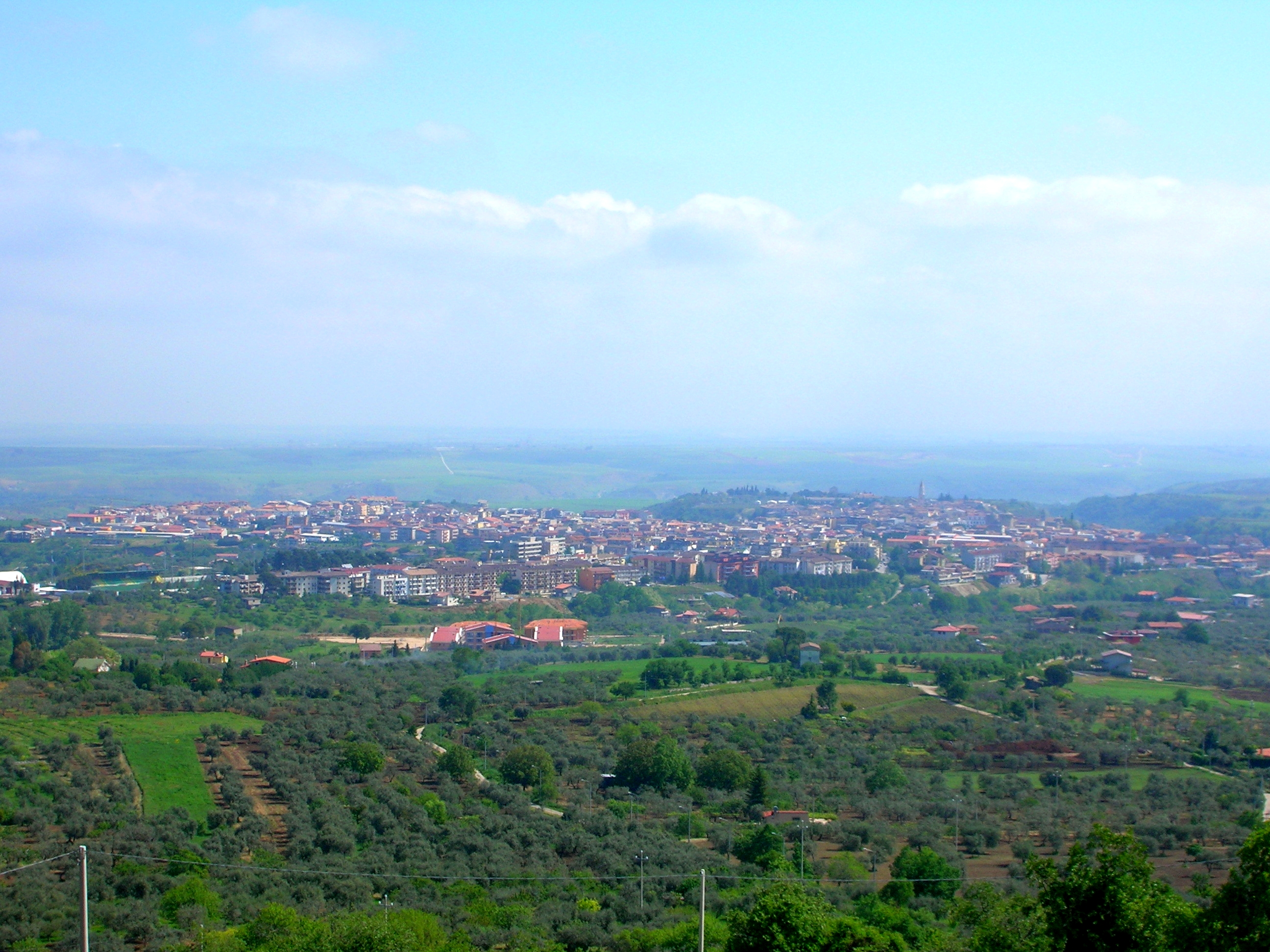
- View of Venosa

- Coat of arms

- Location within Italy Location within Basilicata
- Coordinates: 40°57′42.37″N 15°48′53.23″E
- Country: Italy
- Region: Basilicata
- Province: Potenza (PZ)

Government
  - Mayor: Francesco Mollica (Azione)

Area
  - Total: 170.39 km^{2} (65.79 sq mi)
- Elevation: 415 m (1,362 ft)

Population (31 December 2015)
  - Total: 11,863
  - Density: 69.623/km^{2} (180.32/sq mi)
- Demonym: Venosini
- Time zone: UTC+1 (CET)
  - Summer (DST): UTC+2 (CEST)
- Postal code: 85029
- Dialing code: 0972
- ISTAT code: 076095
- Patron saint: St Roch (formerly St Felix of Thibiuca)
- Saint day: August 16
- Website: Official website

Venosa (Lucano: Vënòsë [və'noʊzə]) is an Italian town and comune in the province of Potenza, in the southern Italian region of Basilicata, in the Vulture area. It is bounded by the comuni of Barile, Ginestra, Lavello, Maschito, Montemilone, Palazzo San Gervasio, Rapolla and Spinazzola. It is one of I Borghi più belli d'Italia ("The most beautiful villages of Italy").

== History ==
=== Antiquity ===
The city was known as Venusia ("City of Venus") to the Romans, who credited its establishment—as Aphrodisia ("City of Aphrodite")—to the Homeric hero Diomedes. He was said to have moved to Magna Graecia in southern Italy following the Trojan War, seeking a life of peace and building the town and its temples to appease the anger of Aphrodite for the destruction of her beloved Troy.

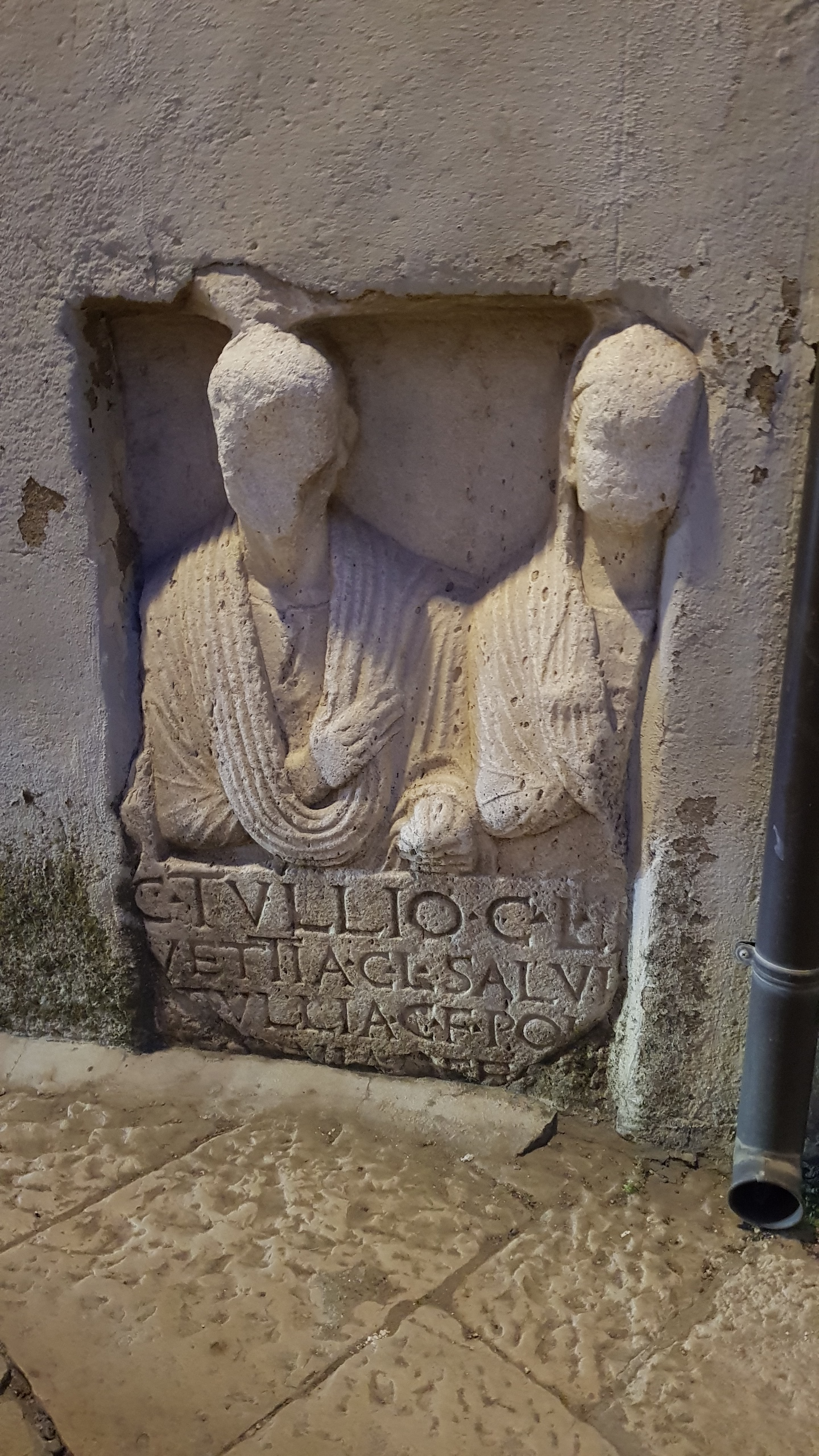
Funerary inscription from the 1st century AD, relating to the burial of a couple of freedmen

The town was taken by the Romans after the Third Samnite War in 291 BC and became a colony for its strategical position between Apulia and Lucania. No fewer than 20,000 men were sent there, owing to its military importance.

Throughout the Hannibalic wars, it remained faithful to Rome, and had a further contingent of colonists sent in 200 BC to replace its losses in the war. In 190 BC the Appian Way was extended to the town. Some coins of Venusia of this period exist.

It took part in the Social War, and was recaptured by Quintus Metellus Pius; it then became a municipium, but in 43 BC its territory was assigned to the veterans of the triumvirs, and it became a colony once more.

Horace was born here in 65 BC. His father's estate in Venusia was confiscated by Augustus after his victory in the civil wars for the settlement of veterans, like many others throughout Italy.

It remained an important place under the Empire as a station on the Via Appia, though Theodor Mommsen's description of it as having branch roads to Aequum Tuticum and Potentia, and Kiepert's maps annexed to the volume, do not agree with one another.

=== Late antiquity ===
During Late Antiquity, Venosa housed the second-largest Jewish community in Italy, following Rome. While specific founding dates are elusive, evidence suggests Jews resided in Venosa for centuries.

The Jews of Venosa initially buried their dead in a set of catacombs, likely built and used between the 4th and 6th centuries AD. When the catacombs fell out of use, local Jews began burying their deceased on the hill atop the catacombs, with some tombstones dating back to the 9th century still visible, repurposed into the walls of a church nearby. Inscriptions, primarily in Greek and Latin, exhibit a transition to Hebrew, while artistic themes show a preference for Jewish symbols such as the menorah. Despite this distinct identity, the community actively engaged with broader society, with Jewish officials holding public positions in the town.

After the fall of the Western Roman Empire, Venusia was sacked by the Heruls, and in 493 AD it was turned into the administrative centre of the area in the Ostrogothic kingdom of Italy, although later this role was moved to Acerenza.

The Lombards made it a gastaldate in 570/590.

=== Middle Ages ===
In 842 Venosa was sacked by the Saracens, who were later ousted by Emperor Louis II.

Next rulers in the 9th century were the Byzantines, who lost control of it after their defeat in 1041 by the Normans. Under the latter, Venosa was assigned to Drogo of Hauteville. In 1133 the town was sacked and set on fire by Roger II of Sicily.

His later successor Frederick II had a castle built here where a Lombard outpost existed before, which was to house the Treasury (Ministry of Finances) of the Kingdom of Sicily.

Frederick's son, Manfred of Sicily, was perhaps born here in 1232. After the latter's fall, the Hohenstaufens were replaced by the Angevines; King Charles of Anjou assigned Venosa as a county to his son Robert.

=== Modern era ===
After a series of different feudal lords, Venosa became a possession of the Orsini in 1453. Count Pirro Del Balzo, who had married Donata Orsini, built a new castle (1460–1470) and a cathedral.

Then, during Aragonese rule, the Gesualdo family, which included the notorious prince and musician Carlo Gesualdo, took control in 1561.

Despite the plague that had reduced its population from the 13,000 of 1503 to 6,000, Venosa had a flourishing cultural life under the Gesualdos: apart from the famous Carlo, other relevant figures of the period include the poet Luigi Tansillo (1510–1580) and the jurist Giovanni Battista De Luca (1614–1683).

Venosa took part in the revolt of Masaniello in 1647. The Gesualdos were in turn followed by the Ludovisi and the Caracciolo families.

Home to a traditionally strong republican tradition, Venosa had a role in the peasant revolts and the Carbonari movement of the early 19th century.

A true civil war between baronial powers and supporters of the peasants' rights broke out in 1849, being harshly suppressed by the Neapolitan troops.(See Sicilian revolution of independence of 1848.)

In 1861, after the fall of the Kingdom of the Two Sicilies during the Italian unification, Venosa was occupied by some bands of brigands under the command of Carmine Crocco in order to restore the Bourbon power in Basilicata.

== Main sights ==
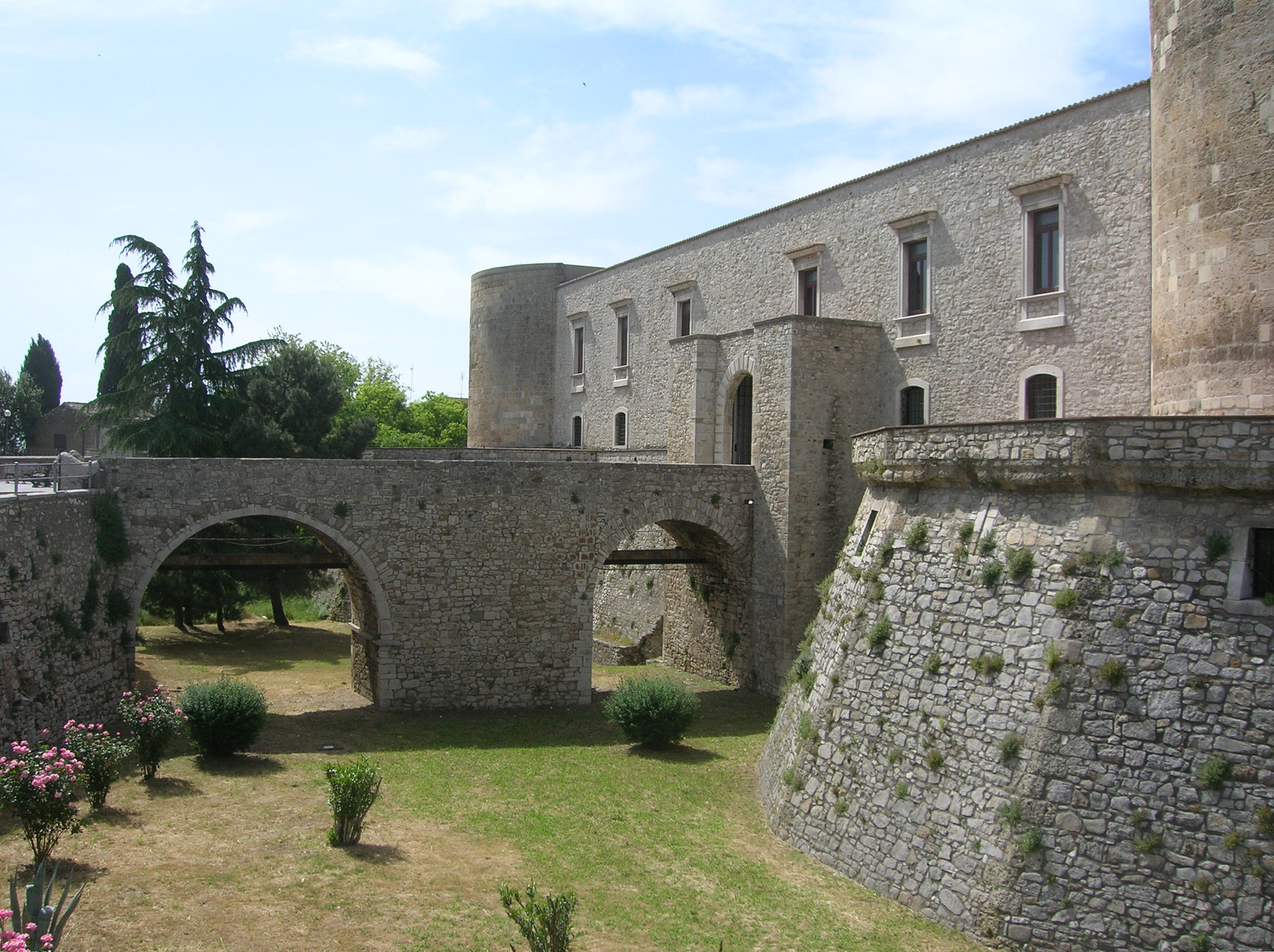
The Aragonese Castle.

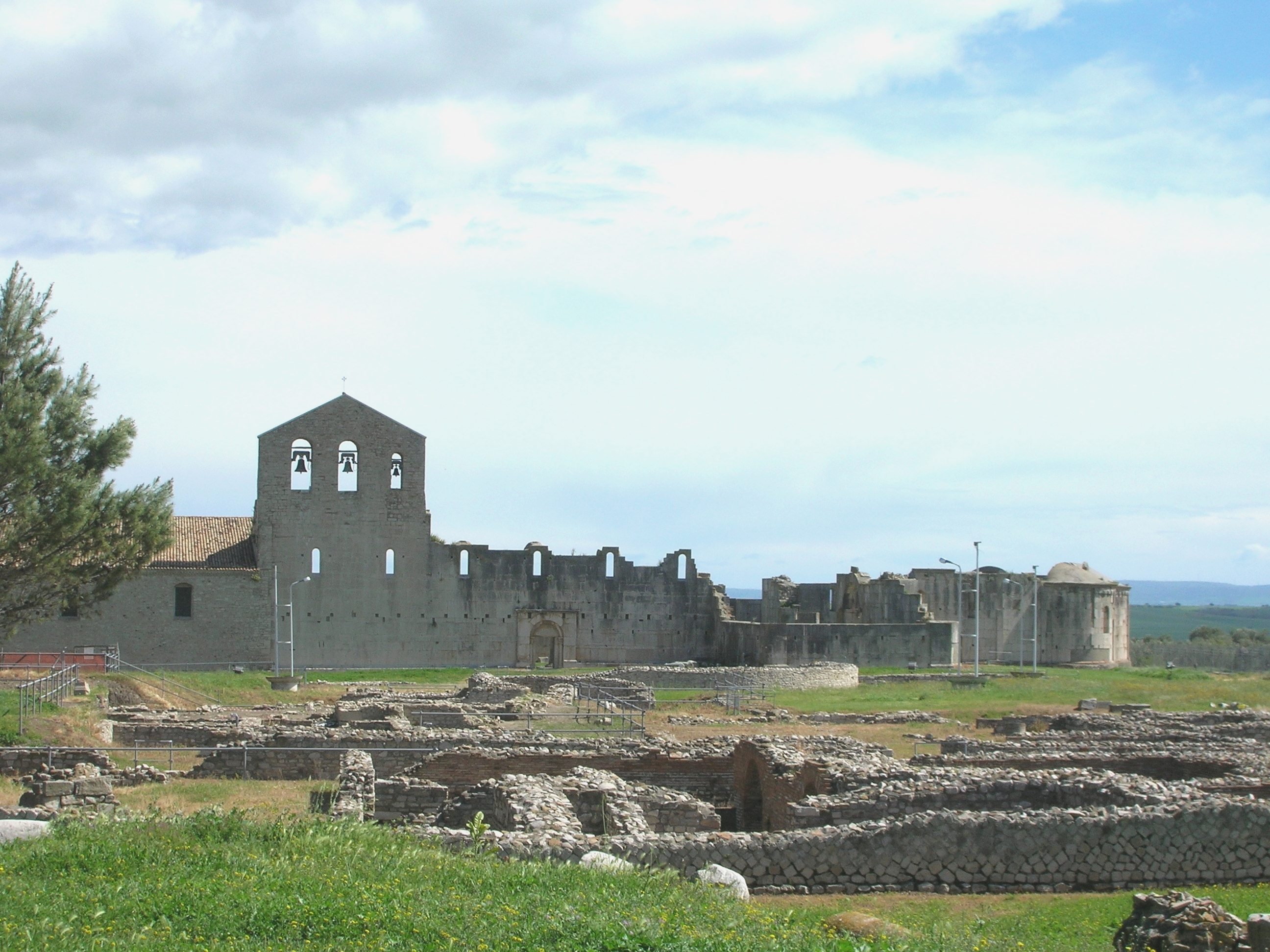
The Church of SS. Trinità.

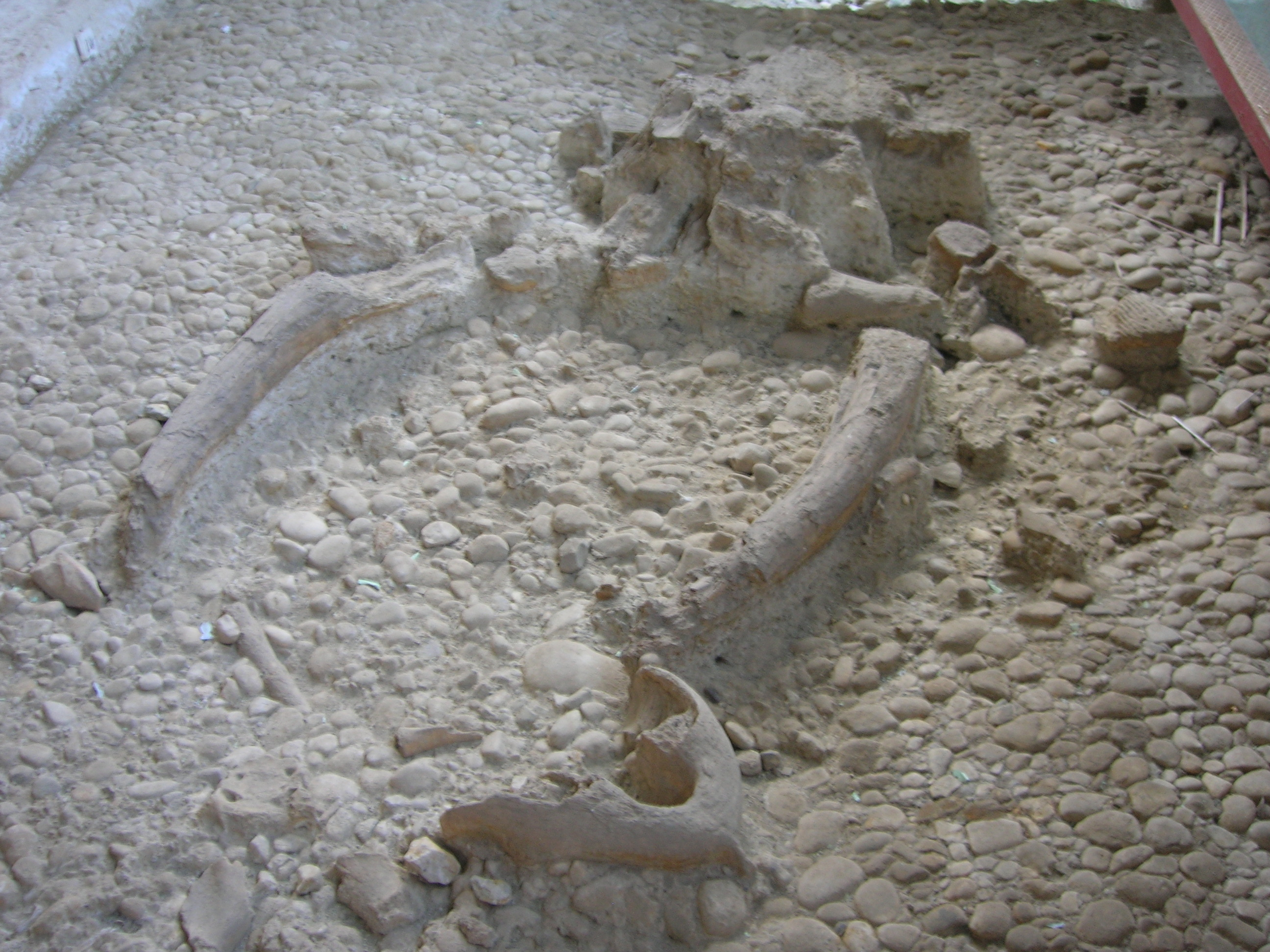
The Archaeological Area of Notarchirico.

- The Aragonese castle, built in 1470 by Pirro del Balzo Orsini. It has a square plan with four cylindrical towers. The shining sun, the del Balzo coat of arms, is visible on the western towers. It was turned into a residence by Carlo and Emanuele Gesualdo, who added also an internal loggia, the north-western wing and bastions used as prisons. From 1612 it was the seat of the Accademia dei Rinascenti. It is now home to the National Museum of Venosa, inaugurated in 1991, with ancient Roman and other findings up to the 9th century. The entrance is preceded by a fountain conceded by King Charles I of Anjou.
- Many fragments of Roman workmanship are built into the walls of the cathedral, which is due to Pirro del Balzo also (c. 1470).
- The abbey church of SS. Trinità is historically interesting; it was consecrated in 1059 by Pope Nicholas II and passed into the hands of the Knights of Saint John in the time of Boniface VIII (1295–1303). In the central aisle is the tomb of Alberada, the first wife of Robert Guiscard and mother of Bohemund. An inscription on the wall commemorates the great Norman brothers William Iron Arm, Drogo, Humfrey and Robert Guiscard. The bones of these brothers rest together in a simple stone sarcophagus opposite the tomb of Alberada. The church also contains some 14th-century frescoes. Behind it is a larger church, which was begun for the Benedictines about 1150, from the designs of a French architect, in imitation of the Cluniac church at Paray-le-Monial, but never carried beyond the spring of the vaulting. The ancient amphitheatre adjacent furnished the materials for its walls.
- Baroque Church of the Purgatory (or San Filippo Neri)
- The Archaeological Area of Notarchirico, in the communal territory. It covers the Palaeolithic period with eleven layers dating from 600,000 to 300,000 years ago. Remains of ancient wildlife, including extinct species of elephants, bisons and rhinoceroses, have been found, as well as a fragment of a femur of Homo erectus.
- Jewish catacombs with inscriptions in Hebrew, Greek and Latin show the importance of the Jewish population here in the 4th and 5th centuries.
- Remains of the ancient city walls and of an amphitheatre still exist, and a number of inscriptions have been found there.
- Venosa Cathedral

== People ==
- Horace (65 BC – 8 BC): Roman poet
- Manfred (1232–1266): king of Sicily
- Bartolomeo Maranta (1500–1571): physician, botanist, and literary theorist
- Luigi Tansillo (1510–1568): poet
- Carlo Gesualdo (1566–1613): music composer, lutenist and nobleman
- Giovanni Battista de Luca (1614–1683): jurist and cardinal
- Giacomo Di Chirico (1844–1883): painter
- Mario de Bernardi (1893–1959): colonel and aviator
- Cinzia Giorgio (b. 1975): writer
- Chiello (b. 1999): singer-songwriter and rapper

== Twin towns ==
- Tortolì, Italy
- Bernalda, Italy
