= Forenza =

- Comune
- Comune di Forenza
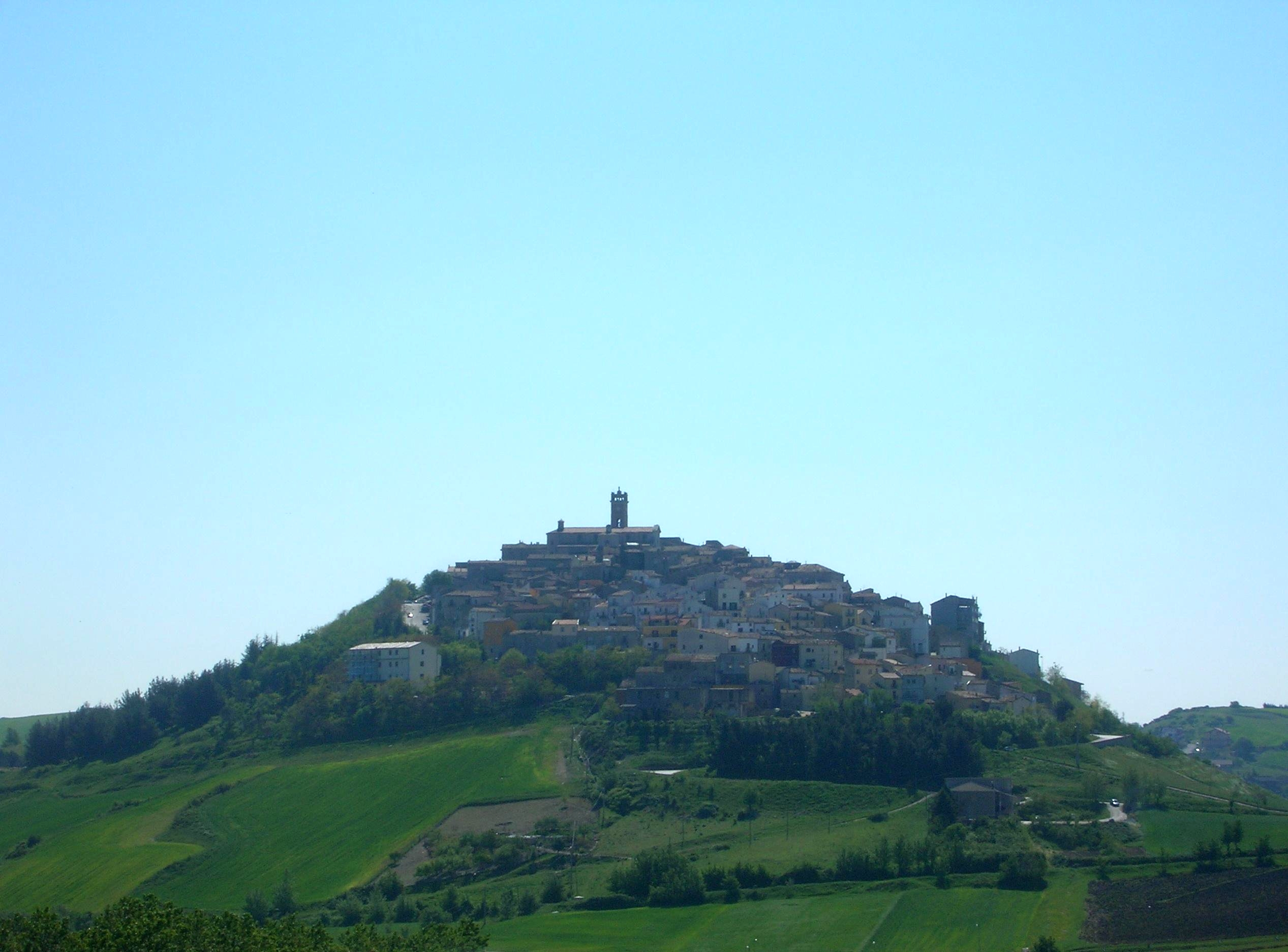
- View of Forenza

- Location within Italy Location within Basilicata
- Coordinates: 40°52′N 15°51′E
- Country: Italy
- Region: Basilicata
- Province: Potenza (PZ)

Government
  - Mayor: Francesco Mastrandrea

Area
  - Total: 116.31 km^{2} (44.91 sq mi)
- Elevation: 836 m (2,743 ft)

Population (31 August 2017)
  - Total: 2,033
  - Density: 17.48/km^{2} (45.27/sq mi)
- Demonym(s): Forenzesi, Forentani
- Time zone: UTC+1 (CET)
  - Summer (DST): UTC+2 (CEST)
- Postal code: 85023
- Dialing code: 0971
- ISTAT code: 076033
- Patron saint: St. Charles Borromeo
- Saint day: 4 November
- Website: Official website

Forenza (Lucano: Ferénze) is a town and comune in the province of Potenza, Basilicata, southern Italy. It is bounded by the comuni of Acerenza, Avigliano, Filiano, Ginestra, Maschito, Palazzo San Gervasio, Pietragalla, Ripacandida.

The village of Forenza is built on a hill top near the ruins of the ancient Samnite city of Forentum, which was occupied by the ancient Romans in 317 BC and destroyed during the Gothic War of 535–553 AD.

== Main sights ==
Sights include:

- Chiesa del Crocifisso, which preserves a wooden crucifix from the 17th century
- Chiesa Madre (Mother Church), featuring a Romanesque portal
- Annunziata Church, housing a statue of S. Maria of the Lombards in the interior.
