= Jewish catacombs of Venosa =

Ancient burial place in Italy

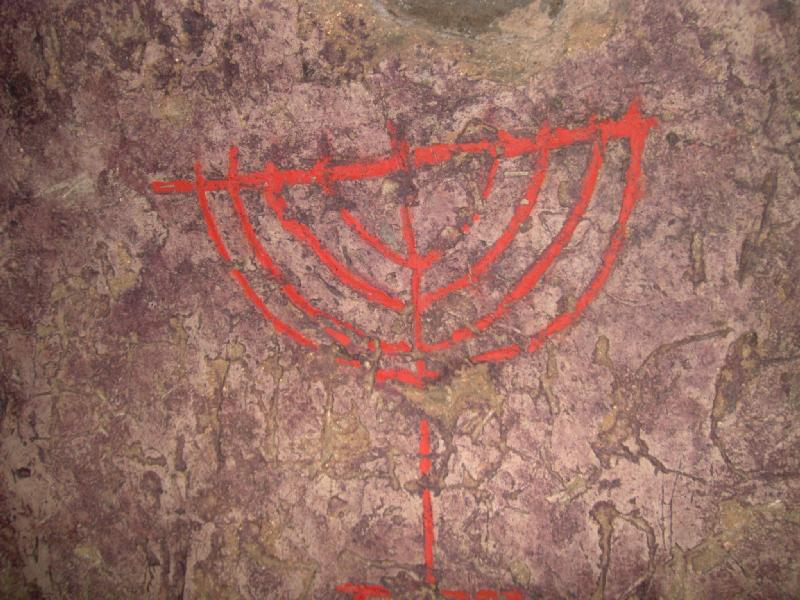
- Hanukkah menorah depicted in the Catacombs of Venosa
- Interactive map of Jewish catacombs of Venosa
- 40°59′N 15°50′E
- Type: Catacombs
- Location: Venosa, Province of Potenza, Italy

History
- Built: 4nd-4th centuries CE

The Jewish Catacombs of Venosa are a set of catacombs located near the Italian city of Venosa, Province of Potenza, on Maddelena Hill.

== Description ==
The exact date of construction for the catacombs is unknown, but it seems likely that they were built and used between the 4th and 6th centuries CE.

They were discovered in 1853 and became the subject of systematic study only from 1974 onwards.

The structure of the catacombs is simple, with two parallel tunnels connected by passages.

In total, the catacombs have yielded about seventy epigraphs, one of which is dated precisely to 521. Most of the names listed in the catacombs reflect the tendency of Jewish diaspora to take Koine Greek or Latin names as opposed to names in Hebrew, with only a small minority of the people buried there having names reflecting a Hebrew etymology. The earliest writing in the catacombs is usually in Koine Greek, with Latin existing in the newer and deeper sections of the catacombs. There is more Hebrew text in these catacombs than in the better-known Jewish catacombs of Rome. Religious iconography, such as the menorah, can be seen in the catacombs.

One inscription, possibly from the 5th century, commemorates Faustina, daughter of Faustinus, a 14-year-old who died at the age of 14 and 5 months. She was eulogized by two emissaries (apostvli) and two rabbis (rebbites). It is possible that they were sent by the Nasi.
