= Bidirectional text =

Text that contains both LTR and RTL text

A bidirectional text contains two text directionalities, right-to-left (RTL) and left-to-right (LTR). It generally involves text containing different types of alphabets, but may also refer to boustrophedon, which is changing text direction in each row.

An example is the RTL Hebrew name Sarah: שרה, spelled sin (ש) on the right, resh (ר) in the middle, and heh (ה) on the left. Many computer programs failed to display this correctly, because they were designed to display text in one direction only.

Some so-called right-to-left scripts such as the Persian script and Arabic are mostly, but not exclusively, right-to-left—mathematical expressions, numeric dates and numbers bearing units are embedded from left to right. That also happens if text from a left-to-right language such as English is embedded in them; or vice versa, if Arabic is embedded in a left-to-right script such as English.

== Bidirectional script support ==
Bidirectional script support is the capability of a computer system to correctly display bidirectional text. The term is often shortened to "BiDi" or "bidi".

Early computer installations were designed only to support a single writing system, typically for left-to-right scripts based on the Latin alphabet only. Adding new character sets and character encodings enabled a number of other left-to-right scripts to be supported, but did not easily support right-to-left scripts such as Arabic or Hebrew, and mixing the two was not practical. Right-to-left scripts were introduced through encodings like ISO/IEC 8859-6 and ISO/IEC 8859-8, storing the letters (usually) in writing and reading order. It is possible to simply flip the left-to-right display order to a right-to-left display order, but doing this sacrifices the ability to correctly display left-to-right scripts. With bidirectional script support, it is possible to mix characters from different scripts on the same page, regardless of writing direction.

In particular, the Unicode standard provides foundations for complete BiDi support, with detailed rules as to how mixtures of left-to-right and right-to-left scripts are to be encoded and displayed.

== Unicode bidi support ==
The Unicode standard calls for characters to be ordered 'logically', i.e. in the sequence they are intended to be interpreted, as opposed to 'visually', the sequence they appear. This distinction is relevant for bidi support because at any bidi transition, the visual presentation ceases to be the 'logical' one. Thus, in order to offer bidi support, Unicode prescribes an algorithm for how to convert the logical sequence of characters into the correct visual presentation. For this purpose, the Unicode encoding standard divides all its characters into one of four types: 'strong', 'weak', 'neutral', and 'explicit formatting'.

=== Strong characters ===
Strong characters are those with a definite direction. Examples of this type of character include most alphabetic characters, syllabic characters, Han ideographs, non-European or non-Arabic digits, and punctuation characters that are specific to only those scripts.

=== Weak characters ===
Weak characters are those with vague direction. Examples of this type of character include European digits, Eastern Arabic-Indic digits, arithmetic symbols, and currency symbols.

=== Neutral characters ===
Neutral characters have direction indeterminable without context. Examples include paragraph separators, tabs, and most other whitespace characters. Punctuation symbols that are common to many scripts, such as the colon, comma, full-stop, and the no-break-space also fall within this category.

=== Explicit formatting ===
Explicit formatting characters, also referred to as "directional formatting characters", are special Unicode sequences that direct the algorithm to modify its default behavior. These characters are subdivided into "marks", "embeddings", "isolates", and "overrides". Their effects continue until the occurrence of either a paragraph separator, or a "pop" character.

==== Marks ====
If a "weak" character is followed by another "weak" character, the algorithm will look at the first neighbouring "strong" character. Sometimes this leads to unintentional display errors. These errors are corrected or prevented with "pseudo-strong" characters. Such Unicode control characters are called marks. The mark (U+200E LEFT-TO-RIGHT MARK (LRM) or U+200F RIGHT-TO-LEFT MARK (RLM)) is to be inserted into a location to make an enclosed weak character inherit its writing direction.

For example, to correctly display the U+2122 ™ TRADE MARK SIGN for an English name brand (LTR) in an Arabic (RTL) passage, an LRM mark is inserted after the trademark symbol if the symbol is not followed by LTR text (e.g. "قرأ Wikipedia™ طوال اليوم."). If the LRM mark is not added, the weak character ™ will be neighbored by a strong LTR character and a strong RTL character. Hence, in an RTL context, it will be considered to be RTL, and displayed in an incorrect order (e.g. "قرأ Wikipedia™ طوال اليوم.").

==== Embeddings ====
The "embedding" directional formatting characters are the classical Unicode method of explicit formatting, and as of Unicode 6.3, are being discouraged in favor of "isolates". An "embedding" signals that a piece of text is to be treated as directionally distinct. The text within the scope of the embedding formatting characters is not independent of the surrounding text. Also, characters within an embedding can affect the ordering of characters outside. Unicode 6.3 recognized that directional embeddings usually have too strong an effect on their surroundings and are thus unnecessarily difficult to use.

==== Isolates ====
The "isolate" directional formatting characters signal that a piece of text is to be treated as directionally isolated from its surroundings. As of Unicode 6.3, these are the formatting characters that are being encouraged in new documents – once target platforms are known to support them. These formatting characters were introduced after it became apparent that directional embeddings usually have too strong an effect on their surroundings and are thus unnecessarily difficult to use. Unlike the legacy 'embedding' directional formatting characters, 'isolate' characters have no effect on the ordering of the text outside their scope. Isolates can be nested, and may be placed within embeddings and overrides.

==== Overrides ====
The "override" directional formatting characters allow for special cases, such as for part numbers (e.g. to force a part number made of mixed English, digits and Hebrew letters to be written from right to left), and are recommended to be avoided wherever possible. As is true of the other directional formatting characters, "overrides" can be nested one inside another, and in embeddings and isolates.

===== Using Unicode to override =====
Using U+202D LEFT-TO-RIGHT OVERRIDE will switch the text direction from left-to-right to right-to-left. Similarly, using U+202E RIGHT-TO-LEFT OVERRIDE will switch the text direction from right-to-left to left-to-right based on the Unicode Bidirectional Algorithm.

==== Pops ====
The "pop" directional formatting character, encoded at U+202C POP DIRECTIONAL FORMATTING, terminates the scope of the most recent "embedding", "override", or "isolate".

=== Runs ===
In the algorithm, each sequence of concatenated strong characters is called a "run". A "weak" character that is located between two "strong" characters with the same orientation will inherit their orientation. A "weak" character that is located between two "strong" characters with a different writing direction will inherit the main context's writing direction (in an LTR document the character will become LTR, in an RTL document, it will become RTL).

=== Table of possible BiDi character types ===
Bidirectional character type (Bidi_Class Unicode character property)^{[1]}

Type^{[2]}	Description	Strength	Directionality	General scope	Bidi_Control character^{[3]}
L	Left-to-Right	Strong	L-to-R	Most alphabetic and syllabic characters, Chinese characters, non-European or non-Arabic digits, LRM character, ...	U+200E LEFT-TO-RIGHT MARK (LRM)
R	Right-to-Left	Strong	R-to-L	Adlam, Garay, Hebrew, Mandaic, Mende Kikakui, N'Ko, Samaritan, ancient scripts like Kharoshthi and Nabataean, RLM character, ...	U+200F RIGHT-TO-LEFT MARK (RLM)
AL	Arabic Letter	Strong	R-to-L	Arabic, Hanifi Rohingya, Sogdian, Syriac, and Thaana alphabets, and most punctuation specific to those scripts, ALM character, ...	U+061C ARABIC LETTER MARK (ALM)
EN	European Number	Weak		European digits, Eastern Arabic-Indic digits, Coptic epact numbers, ...	
ES	European Separator	Weak		plus sign, minus sign, ...	
ET	European Number Terminator	Weak		degree sign, currency symbols, ...	
AN	Arabic Number	Weak		Arabic-Indic digits, Arabic decimal and thousands separators, Rumi digits, Hanifi Rohingya digits, ...	
CS	Common Number Separator	Weak		colon, comma, full stop, no-break space, ...	
NSM	Nonspacing Mark	Weak		Characters in General Categories Mark, nonspacing, and Mark, enclosing (Mn, Me)	
BN	Boundary Neutral	Weak		Default ignorables, non-characters, control characters other than those explicitly given other types	
B	Paragraph Separator	Neutral		paragraph separator, appropriate Newline Functions, higher-level protocol paragraph determination	
S	Segment Separator	Neutral		Tabs	
WS	Whitespace	Neutral		space, figure space, line separator, form feed, General Punctuation block spaces (smaller set than the Unicode whitespace list)	
ON	Other Neutrals	Neutral		All other characters, including object replacement character	
LRE	Left-to-Right Embedding	Explicit	L-to-R	LRE character only	U+202A LEFT-TO-RIGHT EMBEDDING (LRE)
LRO	Left-to-Right Override	Explicit	L-to-R	LRO character only	U+202D LEFT-TO-RIGHT OVERRIDE (LRO)
RLE	Right-to-Left Embedding	Explicit	R-to-L	RLE character only	U+202B RIGHT-TO-LEFT EMBEDDING (RLE)
RLO	Right-to-Left Override	Explicit	R-to-L	RLO character only	U+202E RIGHT-TO-LEFT OVERRIDE (RLO)
PDF	Pop Directional Format	Explicit		PDF character only	U+202C POP DIRECTIONAL FORMATTING (PDF)
LRI	Left-to-Right Isolate	Explicit	L-to-R	LRI character only	U+2066 LEFT-TO-RIGHT ISOLATE (LRI)
RLI	Right-to-Left Isolate	Explicit	R-to-L	RLI character only	U+2067 RIGHT-TO-LEFT ISOLATE (RLI)
FSI	First Strong Isolate	Explicit		FSI character only	U+2068 FIRST STRONG ISOLATE (FSI)
PDI	Pop Directional Isolate	Explicit		PDI character only	U+2069 POP DIRECTIONAL ISOLATE (PDI)
Notes 1.Unicode Bidirectional Algorithm (UAX#9), As of Unicode version 16.0 2.Possible Bidirectional character types for character property: Bidi_Class or 'type' 3.Bidi_Control characters: Twelve Bidi_Control formatting characters are defined. They are invisible, and have no effect apart from directionality. Nine of them have a unique, overruling BiDi-type that is used by the algorithm. Their type is also their acronym (e.g. character 'LRE' has BiDi type 'LRE').

=== Security ===
Unicode bidirectional characters are used in the Trojan Source vulnerability.

Visual Studio Code highlights BiDi control characters since version 1.62 released in October 2021.

Visual Studio highlights BiDi control characters since version 17.0.3 released on December 14, 2021.

== Scripts using bidirectional text ==
=== Egyptian hieroglyphs ===
Egyptian hieroglyphs were written bidirectionally, where the signs that had a distinct "head" or "tail" faced the beginning of the line.

=== Chinese characters and other CJK scripts ===
Chinese characters can be written in either direction as well as vertically (top to bottom then right to left), especially in signs (such as plaques), but the orientation of the individual characters does not change. This can often be seen on tour buses in China, where the company name customarily runs from the front of the vehicle to its rear — that is, from right to left on the right side of the bus, and from left to right on the left side of the bus. English texts on the right side of the vehicle are also quite commonly written in reverse order. (See pictures of tour bus and post vehicle below.)

Likewise, other CJK scripts made up of the same square characters, such as the Japanese writing system and Korean writing system, can also be written in any direction, although horizontally left-to-right, top-to-bottom and vertically top-to-bottom right-to-left are the two most common forms.

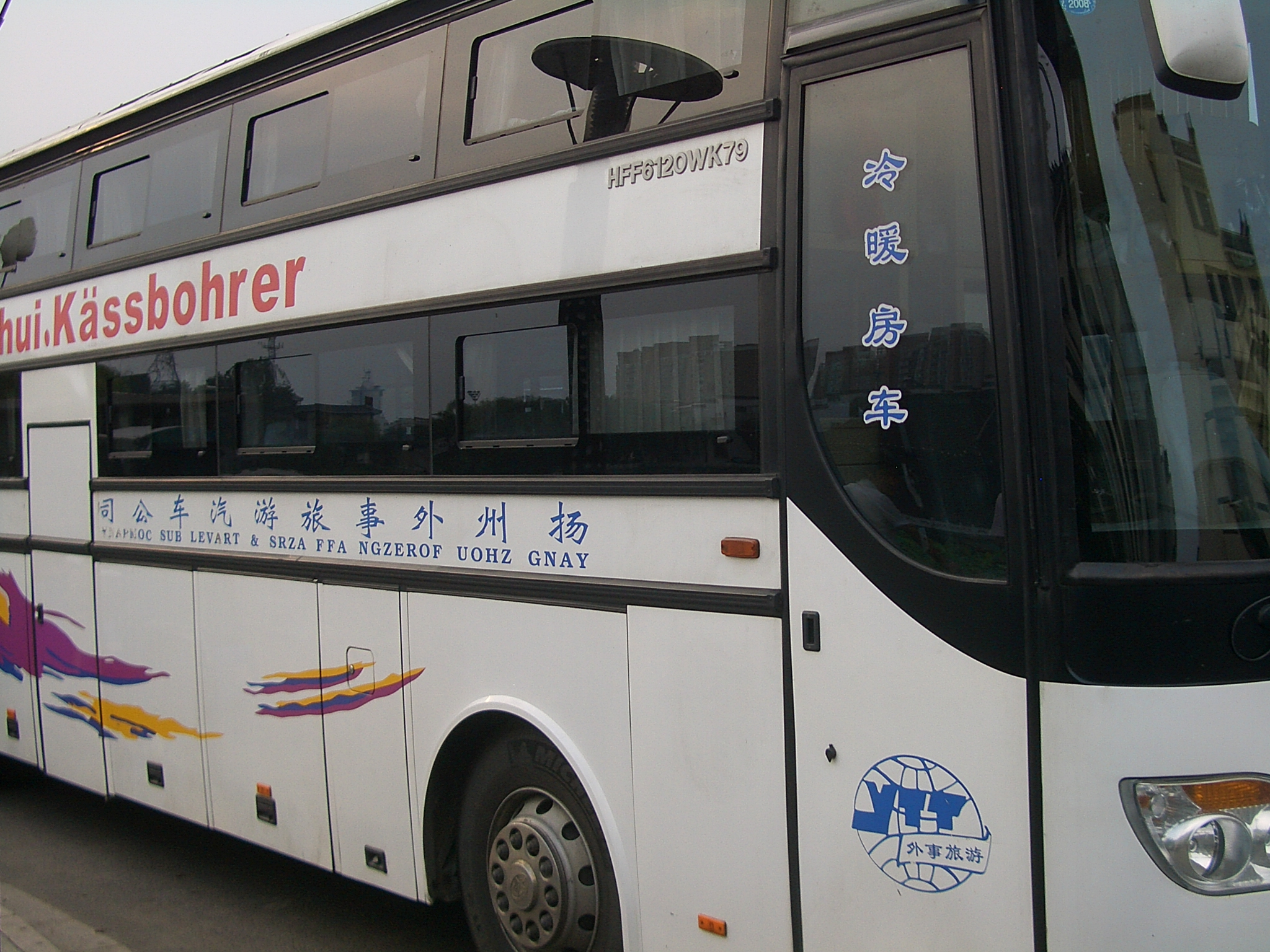
The right side (text runs from right to left, including the English text)

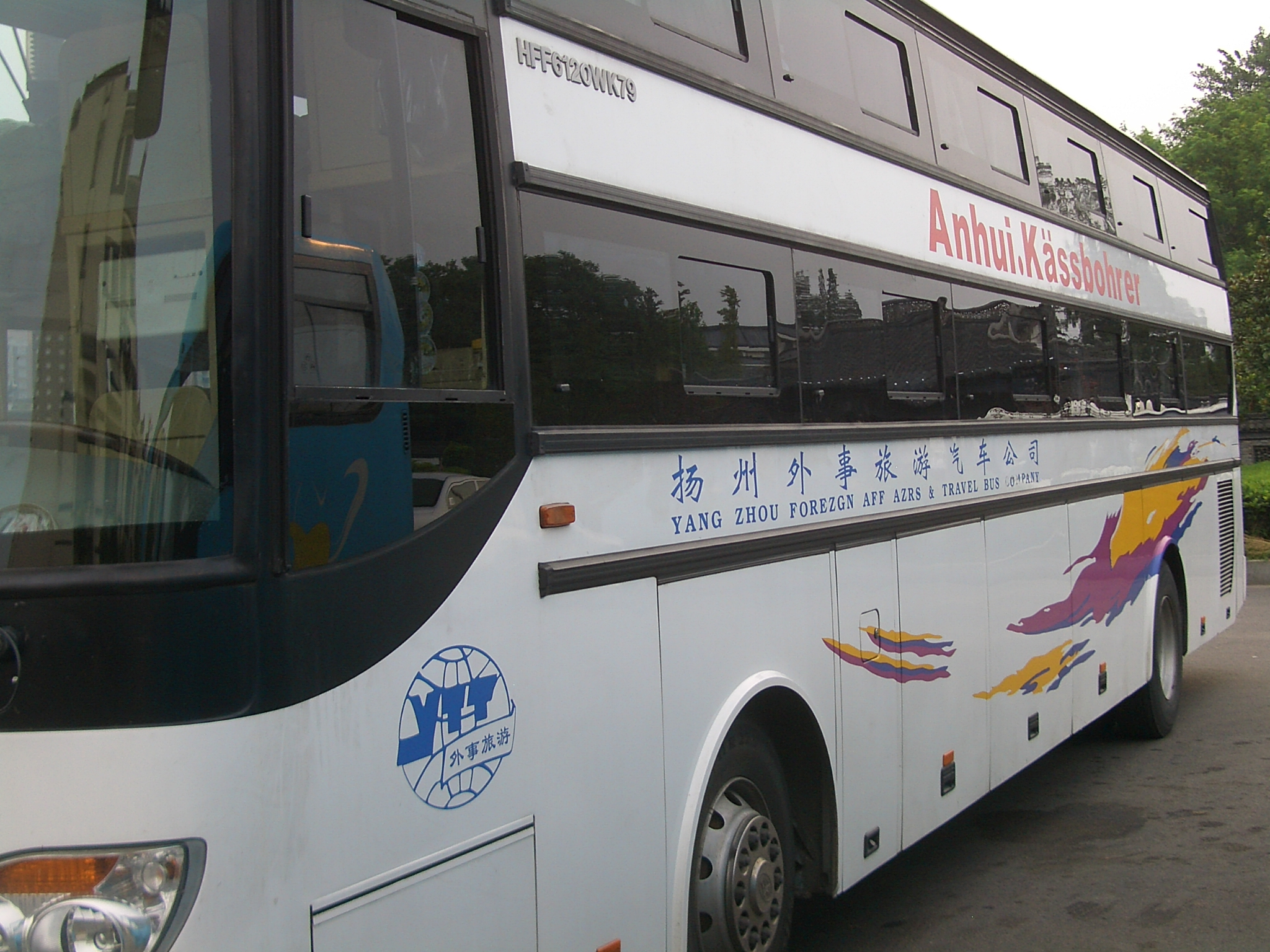
The left side (text runs from left to right)

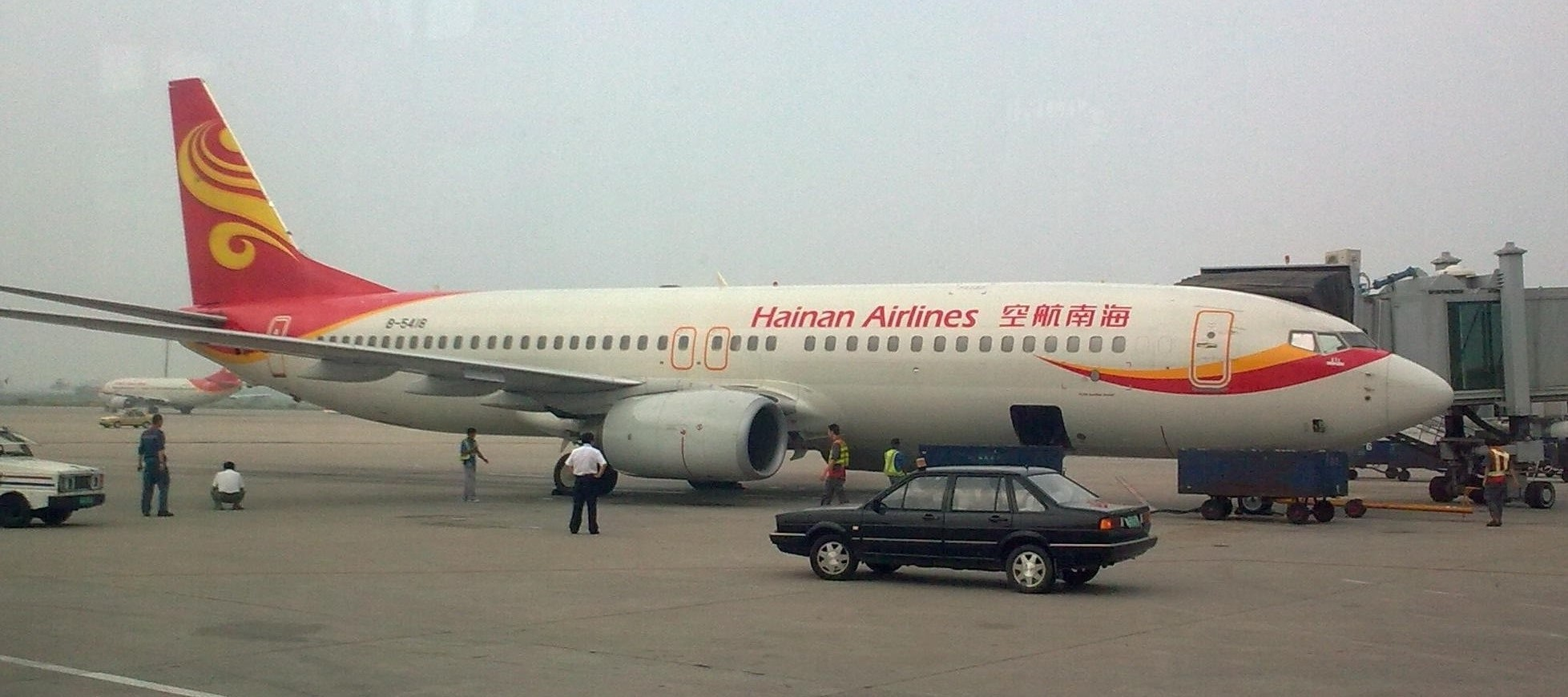
On the right side of this Hainan Airlines aircraft, the text runs from right to left (空航南海).

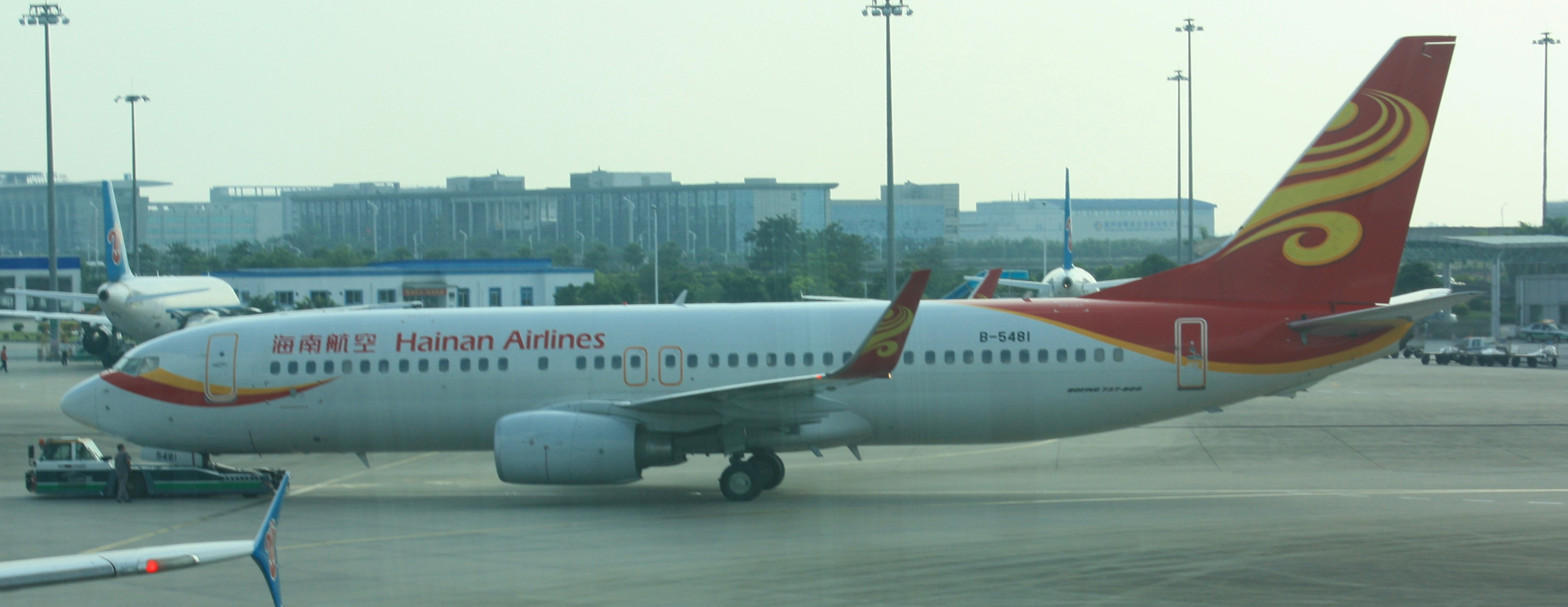
The left side of this Hainan Airlines aircraft, however, shows the text running from left to right (海南航空).

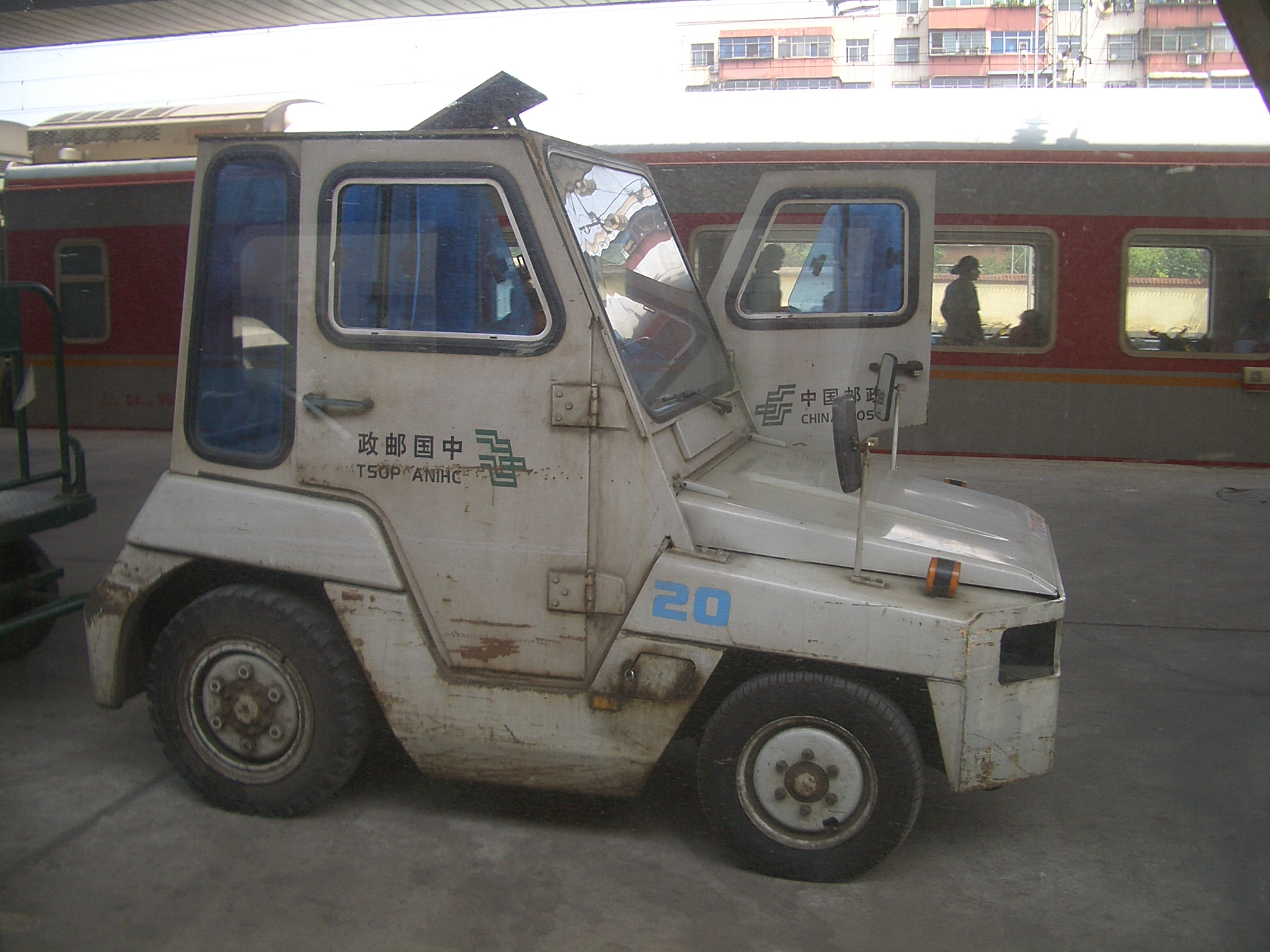
A photo that shows text on both sides of a China Post vehicle. On the right door, china post appears as tsop anihc.

=== Boustrophedon ===
Boustrophedon is a writing style found in ancient Greek inscriptions, Old Sabaic (an Old South Arabian language), Hungarian runes, and the Rongorongo script of Rapa Nui (Easter Island). This method of writing alternates direction, and usually reverses the individual characters, on each successive line.

=== Moon type ===
Moon type is an embossed adaptation of the Latin alphabet invented as a tactile alphabet for the blind. Initially the text changed direction (but not character orientation) at the end of the lines. Special embossed lines connected the end of a line and the beginning of the next. Around 1990, it changed to a left-to-right orientation.

== See also ==
- Internationalization and localization
- Horizontal and vertical writing in East Asian scripts
- Writing system § Directionality and orientation
- Cyrillic numerals
- Right-to-left mark
- Transformation of text
- Boustrophedon
