= Unicode character property =

Unicode code point property names and their uses

The Unicode Standard assigns various properties to each Unicode character and code point.

The properties can be used to handle characters (code points) in processes, like in line-breaking, script direction right-to-left or applying controls. Some "character properties" are also defined for code points that have no character assigned and code points that are labelled like "<not a character>". The character properties are described in Standard Annex #44.

Properties have levels of forcefulness: normative, informative, contributory, or provisional. For simplicity of specification, a character property can be assigned by specifying a continuous range of code points that have the same property.

== Semantic elements ==
Properties are displayed in the following order:

[code];[name];[gc];[cc];[bc];[decomposition];[nv-dec];[nv-dig];[nv-num];[bm];[alias];;[upper case];[lower case];[title case]

- alias = corrected name. Obsolete. Now tracked with a separate database, but remains for Unicode 1.0 names.
- bc = bidi (bidirectional) category [L, R etc]
- bm = bidi mirrored [N or Y]
- cc = combining class [position of diacritic]
- decomposition type or <mapping> = letter + diacritic, ligature X Y, superscript X, font X, initial X, medial X, final X, isolated X, vertical X, etc.
- gc = general category [letter, symbol, digit, punctuation, case behaviour, etc.]
- nv = numeric type and value [of a digit]. If numeric type is 'decimal', all 3 slots are filled. If 'digit', the first will be null. (This has been discontinued.) If 'numeric', then the first two will be null and only the last will be used.

The property between alias and upper case is obsolete and is now null for all Unicode characters.

== Name and alias ==
A Unicode character is assigned a unique Name (na). The name is composed of uppercase letters A–Z, digits 0–9, hyphen-minus and space. Some sequences are excluded: names beginning with a space or hyphen, names ending with a space or hyphen, repeated spaces or hyphens, and space after hyphen are not allowed. The name is guaranteed to be unique within Unicode, and can be used to identify a code point and its character. Ideographic characters, of which there are tens of thousands, are named in the pattern "cjk unified ideograph-hhhh". For example, U+4E00 一 CJK UNIFIED IDEOGRAPH-4E00. Formatting characters also have names: U+00A0 NO-BREAK SPACE.

The following Unicode categories do not have a Name value assigned: Controls (General Category: Cc), Private use (Co), Surrogate (Cs), Non-characters (Cn) and Reserved (Cn). They may be referenced, informally, by a generic or specific meta-name, called "Code Point Labels": <control>, <control-0088>, <reserved>, <noncharacter-hhhh>, <private-use-hhhh>, or <surrogate>. Since these labels contain "<" and ">", they can never appear in a Name, which prevents confusion.

=== Unicode 1.0 names ===
In version 2.0 of Unicode, many names were changed. From then on the rule "a name will never change" came into effect, including the strict (normative) use of alias names. Disused Unicode 1.0 names were moved to the property Alias, to provide backward compatibility.

For example, U+0264 ɤ LATIN SMALL LETTER RAMS HORN has the Unicode 1.0 name "LATIN SMALL LETTER BABY GAMMA".

=== Character name alias ===
Starting from Unicode 2.0, the published name for a code point will never change. Therefore, in the event of a character name being misspelled or if the character name is completely wrong or seriously misleading, a formal Character Name Alias may be assigned to the character, and this alias may be used by applications instead of the actual defective character name. For example, U+FE18 ︘ PRESENTATION FORM FOR VERTICAL RIGHT WHITE LENTICULAR BRAKCET has the character name alias "PRESENTATION FORM FOR VERTICAL RIGHT WHITE LENTICULAR BRACKET" in order to mitigate the misspelling of "bracket" as "brakcet" [sic] in the actual character name; U+A015 ꀕ YI SYLLABLE WU has the character name alias "YI SYLLABLE ITERATION MARK" because, contrary to the character name, it does not have a fixed syllabic value.

In addition to character name aliases which are corrections to defective character names, some characters are assigned aliases which are alternative names or abbreviations. Five types of character name aliases are defined in the Unicode Standard:

- Correction: corrections for misspelled or seriously incorrect character names;
- Control: ISO 6429 names for C0 and C1 control functions (which are not assigned character names in the Unicode Standard);
- Alternate: alternative names for some format characters (only U+FEFF ZERO WIDTH NO-BREAK SPACE which has the alias "BYTE ORDER MARK");
- Figment: Documented labels for some C1 control code functions which are not actual names in any standard;
- Abbreviation: Abbreviations or acronyms for control codes, format characters, spaces, and variation selectors.

All formal character name aliases follow the rules for permissible character names, and are guaranteed to be unique within both the character name alias and the character name namespaces (for this reason, the ISO 6429 name "BELL" is not defined as an alias for U+0007 <control-0007> because U+1F514 is named "BELL"; U+0007 instead has the alias "ALERT").

As of Unicode 18.0, 39 formal character name aliases are defined as corrections for defective character names.

Apart from these normative names, informal names may be shown in the Unicode code charts. These are other commonly used names for a character, and do not have the same character restriction. These informal names are not guaranteed to be unique, and may be changed or removed in later versions of the standard.

== General Category ==
Each code point is assigned a value for General Category. This is one of the character properties that are also defined for unassigned code points and code points that are defined "not a character".

General Category (Unicode Character Property)
| Value | Category Major, minor | Basic type | Character assigned | Count (as of 18.0) | Remarks |
|---|---|---|---|---|---|
L, Letter; LC, Cased Letter (Lu, Ll, and Lt only)
| Lu | Letter, uppercase | Graphic | Character | 1,906 | |
| Ll | Letter, lowercase | Graphic | Character | 2,366 | |
| Lt | Letter, titlecase | Graphic | Character | 31 | Digraphs consisting of an uppercase letter followed by a lowercase letter (e.g., ǅ, ǈ, ǋ, and ǲ) |
| Lm | Letter, modifier | Graphic | Character | 473 | A modifier letter |
| Lo | Letter, other | Graphic | Character | 153,396 | An ideograph or a letter in a unicase alphabet |
M, Mark
| Mn | Mark, nonspacing | Graphic | Character | 2,090 | |
| Mc | Mark, spacing combining | Graphic | Character | 477 | |
| Me | Mark, enclosing | Graphic | Character | 13 | |
N, Number
| Nd | Number, decimal digit | Graphic | Character | 770 | All these, and only these, have Numeric Type = De (Note: Unicode Character Encoding Stability Policies: Property Value Stability Stability policy: Some gc groups will never change. gc=Nd corresponds with Numeric Type=De (decimal).) |
| Nl | Number, letter | Graphic | Character | 562 | Numerals composed of letters or letterlike symbols (e.g., Roman numerals) |
| No | Number, other | Graphic | Character | 915 | E.g., vulgar fractions, superscript and subscript digits, vigesimal digits |
P, Punctuation
| Pc | Punctuation, connector | Graphic | Character | 10 | Includes spacing underscore characters such as "_", and other spacing tie characters. Unlike other punctuation characters, these may be classified as "word" characters by regular expression libraries. |
| Pd | Punctuation, dash | Graphic | Character | 27 | Includes several hyphen characters |
| Ps | Punctuation, open | Graphic | Character | 80 | Opening bracket characters |
| Pe | Punctuation, close | Graphic | Character | 78 | Closing bracket characters |
| Pi | Punctuation, initial quote | Graphic | Character | 12 | Opening quotation mark. Does not include the ASCII "neutral" quotation mark. May behave like Ps or Pe depending on usage |
| Pf | Punctuation, final quote | Graphic | Character | 10 | Closing quotation mark. May behave like Ps or Pe depending on usage |
| Po | Punctuation, other | Graphic | Character | 643 | |
S, Symbol
| Sm | Symbol, math | Graphic | Character | 1,005 | Mathematical symbols (e.g., +, −, =, ×, ÷, √, ∊, ≠). Does not include parentheses and brackets, which are in categories Ps and Pe. Also does not include !, *, -, or /, which despite frequent use as mathematical operators, are primarily considered to be "punctuation". |
| Sc | Symbol, currency | Graphic | Character | 67 | Currency symbols |
| Sk | Symbol, modifier | Graphic | Character | 127 | |
| So | Symbol, other | Graphic | Character | 7,561 | |
Z, Separator
| Zs | Separator, space | Graphic | Character | 17 | Includes the space, but not TAB, CR, or LF, which are Cc |
| Zl | Separator, line | Format | Character | 1 | Only U+2028 LINE SEPARATOR (LSEP) |
| Zp | Separator, paragraph | Format | Character | 1 | Only U+2029 PARAGRAPH SEPARATOR (PSEP) |
C, Other
| Cc | Other, control | Control | Character | 65 (will never change) | No name, (Note: "Table 4-9: Construction of Code Point Labels". The Unicode Standard. Unicode Consortium. September 2025. A Code Point Label may be used to identify a nameless code point. E.g. <control-hhhh>, <control-0088>. The Name remains blank, which can prevent inadvertently replacing, in documentation, a Control Name with a true Control code. Unicode also uses <not a character> for <noncharacter>.) <control> |
| Cf | Other, format | Format | Character | 170 | Includes the soft hyphen, joining control characters (ZWNJ and ZWJ), control characters to support bidirectional text, and language tag characters |
| Cs | Other, surrogate | Surrogate | Not (only used in UTF-16) | 2,048 (will never change) | No name, <surrogate> |
| Co | Other, private use | Private-use | Character (but no interpretation specified) | 137,468 total (will never change) (6,400 in BMP, 131,068 in Planes 15–16) | No name, <private-use> |
| Cn | Other, not assigned | Noncharacter | Not | 66 (will not change unless the range of Unicode code points is expanded) | No name, <noncharacter> |
| Cn | Other, not assigned | Reserved | Not | 801,657 | No name, <reserved> |

=== Punctuation ===
Characters have separate properties to denote they are a punctuation character. The properties all have a Yes/No values: Dash, Quotation_Mark, Sentence_Terminal, Terminal_Punctuation. The Punctuation property refers to characters that are used to divide or structure text, and these are classified into different types based on their roles. Unicode assigns these punctuation characters specific categories.

=== Whitespace ===
Whitespace is a commonly used concept for a typographic effect. Basically it covers invisible characters that have a spacing effect in rendered text. It includes spaces, tabs, and new line formatting controls. In Unicode, such a character has the property set WSpace=yes. In version 18.0, there are 25 whitespace characters.

Unicode characters with property White_Space=yes (Note: White_Space is a binary Unicode property.)
| Name | Code point | | Width box | May break? | In IDN? | Script | Block | General category | Notes |
|---|---|---|---|---|---|---|---|---|---|
| character tabulation | U+0009 | 9 | | Yes | No | Common | Basic Latin | Other, control | HT, Horizontal Tab. HTML/XML named entity: &Tab;, LaTeX: \tab, C escape: \t |
| line feed | U+000A | 10 | Is a line-break | | | Common | Basic Latin | Other, control | LF, Line feed. HTML/XML named entity: &NewLine;, C escape: \n |
| line tabulation | U+000B | 11 | Is a line-break | | | Common | Basic Latin | Other, control | VT, Vertical Tab. C escape: \v |
| form feed | U+000C | 12 | Is a line-break | | | Common | Basic Latin | Other, control | FF, Form feed. C escape: \f |
| carriage return | U+000D | 13 | Is a line-break | | | Common | Basic Latin | Other, control | CR, Carriage return. C escape: \r |
| space | U+0020 | 32 | | Yes | No | Common | Basic Latin | Separator, space | Most common (normal ASCII space). LaTeX: \ |
| next line | U+0085 | 133 | Is a line-break | | | Common | Latin-1; Supplement | Other, control | NEL, Next line. LaTeX: \\ |
| no-break space | U+00A0 | 160 | | No | No | Common | Latin-1; Supplement | Separator, space | Non-breaking space: identical to U+0020, but not a point at which a line may be broken. HTML/XML named entity: &nbsp;, &NonBreakingSpace;, LaTeX: ~ |
| ogham space mark | U+1680 | 5760 | | Yes | No | Ogham | Ogham | Separator, space | Used for interword separation in Ogham text. Normally a vertical line in vertical text or a horizontal line in horizontal text, but may also be a blank space in "stemless" fonts. Requires an Ogham font. |
| en quad | U+2000 | 8192 | | Yes | No | Common | General; Punctuation | Separator, space | Width of one en. U+2002 is canonically equivalent to this character; U+2002 is preferred. |
| em quad | U+2001 | 8193 | | Yes | No | Common | General; Punctuation | Separator, space | Also known as "mutton quad". Width of one em. U+2003 is canonically equivalent to this character; U+2003 is preferred. |
| en space | U+2002 | 8194 | | Yes | No | Common | General; Punctuation | Separator, space | Also known as "nut". Width of one en. U+2000 En Quad is canonically equivalent to this character; U+2002 is preferred. HTML/XML named entity: &ensp;, LaTeX: \enspace (the LaTeX en space is a no-break space) |
| em space | U+2003 | 8195 | | Yes | No | Common | General; Punctuation | Separator, space | Also known as "mutton". Width of one em. U+2001 Em Quad is canonically equivalent to this character; U+2003 is preferred. HTML/XML named entity: &emsp;, LaTeX: \quad |
| three-per-em space | U+2004 | 8196 | | Yes | No | Common | General; Punctuation | Separator, space | Also known as "thick space". One third of an em wide. HTML/XML named entity: &emsp13;, LaTeX: \; (the LaTeX thick space is a no-break space) |
| four-per-em space | U+2005 | 8197 | | Yes | No | Common | General; Punctuation | Separator, space | Also known as "mid space". One fourth of an em wide. HTML/XML named entity: &emsp14; |
| six-per-em space | U+2006 | 8198 | | Yes | No | Common | General; Punctuation | Separator, space | One sixth of an em wide. In computer typography, sometimes equated to U+2009. |
| figure space | U+2007 | 8199 | | No | No | Common | General; Punctuation | Separator, space | Figure space. In fonts with monospaced digits, equal to the width of one digit. HTML/XML named entity: &numsp; |
| punctuation space | U+2008 | 8200 | | Yes | No | Common | General; Punctuation | Separator, space | As wide as the narrow punctuation in a font, i.e. the advance width of the period or comma. HTML/XML named entity: &puncsp; |
| thin space | U+2009 | 8201 | | Yes | No | Common | General; Punctuation | Separator, space | Thin space; one-fifth (sometimes one-sixth) of an em wide. Recommended for use as a thousands separator for measures made with SI units. Unlike U+2002 to U+2008, its width may get adjusted in typesetting. HTML/XML named entity: &thinsp;, &ThinSpace;, LaTeX: \, (the LaTeX thin space is a no-break space) |
| hair space | U+200A | 8202 | | Yes | No | Common | General; Punctuation | Separator, space | Thinner than a thin space. HTML/XML named entity: &hairsp;, &VeryThinSpace; |
| line separator | U+2028 | 8232 | Is a line-break | | | Common | General; Punctuation | Separator, line | |
| paragraph separator | U+2029 | 8233 | Is a line-break | | | Common | General; Punctuation | Separator, paragraph | |
| narrow no-break space | U+202F | 8239 | | No | No | Common | General; Punctuation | Separator, space | Narrow no-break space. Similar in function to U+00A0 No-Break Space. When used with Mongolian, its width is usually one third of the normal space; in other context, its width sometimes resembles that of the Thin Space (U+2009). LaTeX: \, |
| medium mathematical space | U+205F | 8287 | | Yes | No | Common | General; Punctuation | Separator, space | MMSP. Used in mathematical formulae. Four-eighteenths of an em. In mathematical typography, the widths of spaces are usually given in integral multiples of an eighteenth of an em, and 4/18 em may be used in several situations, for example between the a and the + and between the + and the b in the expression a + b. HTML/XML named entity: &MediumSpace;, LaTeX: \: (the LaTeX medium space is a no-break space) |
| ideographic space | U+3000 | 12288 | | Yes | No | Common | CJK Symbols and Punctuation | Separator, space | As wide as a CJK character cell (fullwidth). Used, for example, in tai tou. |

Related Unicode characters with property White_Space=no
| Name | Code point | | Width box | May break? | In IDN? | Script | Block | General category | Notes |
|---|---|---|---|---|---|---|---|---|---|
| mongolian vowel separator | U+180E | 6158 | ᠎ | Yes | No | Mongolian | Mongolian | Other, Format | MVS. A narrow space character, used in Mongolian to cause the final two characters of a word to take on different shapes. It is no longer classified as space character (i.e. in Zs category) in Unicode 6.3.0, even though it was in previous versions of the standard. |
| zero width space | U+200B | 8203 | | Yes | No | Common | General; Punctuation | Other, Format | ZWSP, zero-width space. Used to indicate word boundaries to text processing systems when using scripts that do not use explicit spacing. It is similar to the soft hyphen, with the difference that the latter is used to indicate syllable boundaries, and should display a visible hyphen when the line breaks at it. HTML/XML named entity: &ZeroWidthSpace; (Note: Although &ZeroWidthSpace; is one HTML5 named entity for U+200B, the additional names NegativeMediumSpace, NegativeThickSpace, NegativeThinSpace and NegativeVeryThinSpace (which are names used in the Wolfram Language for negative-advance spaces, which it maps to the Private Use Area) are also defined by HTML5 as aliases for U+200B (e.g. &NegativeMediumSpace;).) |
| zero width non-joiner | U+200C | 8204 | ‌ | Yes | Context-dependent | Inherited | General; Punctuation | Other, Format | ZWNJ, zero-width non-joiner. When placed between two characters that would otherwise be connected, a ZWNJ causes them to be printed in their final and initial forms, respectively. HTML/XML named entity: &zwnj; |
| zero width joiner | U+200D | 8205 | ‍ | Yes | Context-dependent | Inherited | General; Punctuation | Other, Format | ZWJ, zero-width joiner. When placed between two characters that would otherwise not be connected, a ZWJ causes them to be printed in their connected forms. Can also be used to display joining forms in isolation. Depending on whether a ligature or conjunct is expected by default, can either induce (as in emoji and in Sinhala) or suppress (as in Devanagari) substitution with a single glyph, whilst still permitting use of individual joining forms (unlike ZWNJ). HTML/XML named entity: &zwj; |
| word joiner | U+2060 | 8288 | | No | No | Common | General; Punctuation | Other, Format | WJ, word joiner. Similar to U+200B, but not a point at which a line may be broken. HTML/XML named entity: &NoBreak; |
| zero width non-breaking space | U+FEFF | 65279 | | No | No | Common | Arabic; Presentation; Forms-B | Other, Format | Zero-width non-breaking space. Used primarily as a Byte Order Mark. Use as an indication of non-breaking is deprecated as of Unicode 3.2; see U+2060 instead. |

=== Casing ===
The Case value is normative in Unicode. It pertains to those scripts with uppercase and lowercase letters. Case-difference occurs in Adlam, Armenian, Beria Erfe, Cherokee, Coptic, Cyrillic, Deseret, Garay, Glagolitic, Greek, Khutsuri and Mkhedruli Georgian, Latin, Medefaidrin, Old Hungarian, Osage, Vithkuqi and Warang Citi scripts.

Different languages have different case mapping rules.

In Turkish, U+0069 i LATIN SMALL LETTER I corresponds to U+0130 İ LATIN CAPITAL LETTER I WITH DOT ABOVE instead of U+0049 I LATIN CAPITAL LETTER I. Similarly, U+0049 I LATIN CAPITAL LETTER I when corresponds to U+0131 ı LATIN SMALL LETTER DOTLESS I instead of U+0069 i LATIN SMALL LETTER I.

In Nawdm, the letter Ĥ corresponds to ɦ in lowercase instead of the usual case mappings being Ĥĥ and Ɦɦ.

In Greek, the letter sigma has different lowercase forms depending on where it is in a word. U+03A3 Σ GREEK CAPITAL LETTER SIGMA converts to U+03C3 σ GREEK SMALL LETTER SIGMA if it is at the start or middle of a word, and converts to U+03C2 ς GREEK SMALL LETTER FINAL SIGMA if it is at the end of a word.

In Lithuanian, the dot in lowercase i and j is preserved when followed by accents. For example: Í in lowercase is i̇́.

Despite the existence of U+1E9E ẞ LATIN CAPITAL LETTER SHARP S, U+00DF ß LATIN SMALL LETTER SHARP S corresponds to "SS".

Unicode encodes 31 titlecase characters.

- U+01C5 ǅ LATIN CAPITAL LETTER D WITH SMALL LETTER Z WITH CARON
- U+01C8 ǈ LATIN CAPITAL LETTER L WITH SMALL LETTER J
- U+01CB ǋ LATIN CAPITAL LETTER N WITH SMALL LETTER J
- U+01F2 ǲ LATIN CAPITAL LETTER D WITH SMALL LETTER Z
- U+1F88 ᾈ GREEK CAPITAL LETTER ALPHA WITH PSILI AND PROSGEGRAMMENI
- U+1F89 ᾉ GREEK CAPITAL LETTER ALPHA WITH DASIA AND PROSGEGRAMMENI
- U+1F8A ᾊ GREEK CAPITAL LETTER ALPHA WITH PSILI AND VARIA AND PROSGEGRAMMENI
- U+1F8B ᾋ GREEK CAPITAL LETTER ALPHA WITH DASIA AND VARIA AND PROSGEGRAMMENI
- U+1F8C ᾌ GREEK CAPITAL LETTER ALPHA WITH PSILI AND OXIA AND PROSGEGRAMMENI
- U+1F8D ᾍ GREEK CAPITAL LETTER ALPHA WITH DASIA AND OXIA AND PROSGEGRAMMENI
- U+1F8E ᾎ GREEK CAPITAL LETTER ALPHA WITH PSILI AND PERISPOMENI AND PROSGEGRAMMENI
- U+1F8F ᾏ GREEK CAPITAL LETTER ALPHA WITH DASIA AND PERISPOMENI AND PROSGEGRAMMENI
- U+1F98 ᾘ GREEK CAPITAL LETTER ETA WITH PSILI AND PROSGEGRAMMENI
- U+1F99 ᾙ GREEK CAPITAL LETTER ETA WITH DASIA AND PROSGEGRAMMENI
- U+1F9A ᾚ GREEK CAPITAL LETTER ETA WITH PSILI AND VARIA AND PROSGEGRAMMENI
- U+1F9B ᾛ GREEK CAPITAL LETTER ETA WITH DASIA AND VARIA AND PROSGEGRAMMENI
- U+1F9C ᾜ GREEK CAPITAL LETTER ETA WITH PSILI AND OXIA AND PROSGEGRAMMENI
- U+1F9D ᾝ GREEK CAPITAL LETTER ETA WITH DASIA AND OXIA AND PROSGEGRAMMENI
- U+1F9E ᾞ GREEK CAPITAL LETTER ETA WITH PSILI AND PERISPOMENI AND PROSGEGRAMMENI
- U+1F9F ᾟ GREEK CAPITAL LETTER ETA WITH DASIA AND PERISPOMENI AND PROSGEGRAMMENI
- U+1FA8 ᾨ GREEK CAPITAL LETTER OMEGA WITH PSILI AND PROSGEGRAMMENI
- U+1FA9 ᾩ GREEK CAPITAL LETTER OMEGA WITH DASIA AND PROSGEGRAMMENI
- U+1FAA ᾪ GREEK CAPITAL LETTER OMEGA WITH PSILI AND VARIA AND PROSGEGRAMMENI
- U+1FAB ᾫ GREEK CAPITAL LETTER OMEGA WITH DASIA AND VARIA AND PROSGEGRAMMENI
- U+1FAC ᾬ GREEK CAPITAL LETTER OMEGA WITH PSILI AND OXIA AND PROSGEGRAMMENI
- U+1FAD ᾭ GREEK CAPITAL LETTER OMEGA WITH DASIA AND OXIA AND PROSGEGRAMMENI
- U+1FAE ᾮ GREEK CAPITAL LETTER OMEGA WITH PSILI AND PERISPOMENI AND PROSGEGRAMMENI
- U+1FAF ᾯ GREEK CAPITAL LETTER OMEGA WITH DASIA AND PERISPOMENI AND PROSGEGRAMMENI
- U+1FBC ᾼ GREEK CAPITAL LETTER ALPHA WITH PROSGEGRAMMENI
- U+1FCC ῌ GREEK CAPITAL LETTER ETA WITH PROSGEGRAMMENI
- U+1FFC ῼ GREEK CAPITAL LETTER OMEGA WITH PROSGEGRAMMENI

=== Other general characteristics ===
Unicode defines several general character properties in the Unicode Character Database (UAX #44). Some of the most important ones include:

- Ideographic — Characters that represent ideas or concepts rather than specific sounds. These include most Han (CJK) characters used in Chinese, Japanese, and Korean writing systems.
- Alphabetic — Characters that are considered letters in an alphabetic or syllabic writing system. This includes Latin, Greek, Cyrillic letters, as well as characters from syllabaries like Hiragana.
- Noncharacter — Code points that are permanently reserved for internal use and are not assigned to any abstract character. These include U+FDD0 through U+FDEF, and any code ending in FFFE or FFFF (such as U+1FFFE, U+10FFFF).

== Combining class ==
Some common codes:

0 = spacing letter, symbol or modifier (e.g. a, (, ʰ)
1 = overlay
6 = Han reading (CJK diacritic reading marks)
7 = nukta (diacritic nukta in Brahmic scripts)
8 = kana voicing marks
9 = virama

10–199 = various fixed-position classes

Marks which attach to the base letter:

200 = attached at bottom left
202 = attached directly below (e.g. cedilla on ç)
204 = attached at bottom right
208 = attached to left
210 = attached to right
212 = attached to top left
214 = attached directly above
216 = attached at top right

Marks which do not attach to the base letter:

218 = bottom left
220 = directly below (e.g. ring on n̥)
222 = below right
224 = left
226 = right
228 = above left
230 = above (e.g. acute accent on á)
232 = above right
233 = double below (subtends two bases)
234 = double above (extends two bases)
240 = iota subscript (only that Greek diacritic)

== Bidirectional writing ==
Six character properties pertain to bi-directional writing: Bidi_Class, Bidi_Control, Bidi_Mirrored, Bidi_Mirroring_Glyph, Bidi_Paired_Bracket and Bidi_Paired_Bracket_Type.

One of Unicode's major features is support of bi-directional (Bidi) text display right-to-left (R-to-L) and left-to-right (L-to-R). The Unicode Bidirectional Algorithm UAX9 describes the process of presenting text with altering script directions. For example, it enables a Hebrew quote in an English text. The Bidi_Character_Type marks a character's behaviour in directional writing. To override a direction, Unicode has defined special formatting control characters (Bidi-Control characters). These characters can enforce a direction, and by definition only affect bi-directional writing.

Each code point has a property called Bidi_Class. It defines its behaviour in a bidirectional text as interpreted by the algorithm:

Bidirectional character type (Bidi_Class Unicode character property)^{[1]}

| Type^{[2]} | Description | Strength | Directionality | General scope | Bidi_Control character^{[3]} |
|---|---|---|---|---|---|
| L | Left-to-Right | Strong | L-to-R | Most alphabetic and syllabic characters, Chinese characters, non-European or non-Arabic digits, LRM character, ... | U+200E LEFT-TO-RIGHT MARK (LRM) |
| R | Right-to-Left | Strong | R-to-L | Adlam, Garay, Hebrew, Mandaic, Mende Kikakui, N'Ko, Samaritan, ancient scripts like Kharoshthi and Nabataean, RLM character, ... | U+200F RIGHT-TO-LEFT MARK (RLM) |
| AL | Arabic Letter | Strong | R-to-L | Arabic, Hanifi Rohingya, Sogdian, Syriac, and Thaana alphabets, and most punctuation specific to those scripts, ALM character, ... | U+061C ARABIC LETTER MARK (ALM) |
| EN | European Number | Weak | | European digits, Eastern Arabic-Indic digits, Coptic epact numbers, ... | |
| ES | European Separator | Weak | | plus sign, minus sign, ... | |
| ET | European Number Terminator | Weak | | degree sign, currency symbols, ... | |
| AN | Arabic Number | Weak | | Arabic-Indic digits, Arabic decimal and thousands separators, Rumi digits, Hanifi Rohingya digits, ... | |
| CS | Common Number Separator | Weak | | colon, comma, full stop, no-break space, ... | |
| NSM | Nonspacing Mark | Weak | | Characters in General Categories Mark, nonspacing, and Mark, enclosing (Mn, Me) | |
| BN | Boundary Neutral | Weak | | Default ignorables, non-characters, control characters other than those explicitly given other types | |
| B | Paragraph Separator | Neutral | | paragraph separator, appropriate Newline Functions, higher-level protocol paragraph determination | |
| S | Segment Separator | Neutral | | Tabs | |
| WS | Whitespace | Neutral | | space, figure space, line separator, form feed, General Punctuation block spaces (smaller set than the Unicode whitespace list) | |
| ON | Other Neutrals | Neutral | | All other characters, including object replacement character | |
| LRE | Left-to-Right Embedding | Explicit | L-to-R | LRE character only | U+202A LEFT-TO-RIGHT EMBEDDING (LRE) |
| LRO | Left-to-Right Override | Explicit | L-to-R | LRO character only | U+202D LEFT-TO-RIGHT OVERRIDE (LRO) |
| RLE | Right-to-Left Embedding | Explicit | R-to-L | RLE character only | U+202B RIGHT-TO-LEFT EMBEDDING (RLE) |
| RLO | Right-to-Left Override | Explicit | R-to-L | RLO character only | U+202E RIGHT-TO-LEFT OVERRIDE (RLO) |
| PDF | Pop Directional Format | Explicit | | PDF character only | U+202C POP DIRECTIONAL FORMATTING (PDF) |
| LRI | Left-to-Right Isolate | Explicit | L-to-R | LRI character only | U+2066 LEFT-TO-RIGHT ISOLATE (LRI) |
| RLI | Right-to-Left Isolate | Explicit | R-to-L | RLI character only | U+2067 RIGHT-TO-LEFT ISOLATE (RLI) |
| FSI | First Strong Isolate | Explicit | | FSI character only | U+2068 FIRST STRONG ISOLATE (FSI) |
| PDI | Pop Directional Isolate | Explicit | | PDI character only | U+2069 POP DIRECTIONAL ISOLATE (PDI) |
Notes 1.Unicode Bidirectional Algorithm (UAX#9), As of Unicode version 16.0 2.Possible Bidirectional character types for character property: Bidi_Class or 'type' 3.Bidi_Control characters: Twelve Bidi_Control formatting characters are defined. They are invisible, and have no effect apart from directionality. Nine of them have a unique, overruling BiDi-type that is used by the algorithm. Their type is also their acronym (e.g. character 'LRE' has BiDi type 'LRE').

In normal situations, the algorithm can determine the direction of a text by this character property. To control more complex Bidi situations, e.g. when an English text has a Hebrew quote, extra options are added to Unicode. 12 characters have the property Bidi_Control=Yes: ALM, FSI, LRE, LRI, LRM, LRO, PDF, PDI, RLE, RLI, RLM and RLO as named in the table. These are invisible formatting control characters, only used by the algorithm and with no effect outside of bidirectional formatting. Despite the name, they are formatting characters, not control characters, and have General category Other, format (Cf) in the Unicode definition.

Basically, the algorithm determines a sequence of characters with the same strong direction type (R-to-L or L-to-R), taking in account an overruling by the special Bidi-controls. Number strings (Weak types) are assigned a direction according to their strong environment, as are Neutral characters. Finally, the characters are displayed per a string's direction.

Two character properties are relevant to determining a mirror image of a glyph in bidirectional text: Bidi_Mirrored=Yes indicates that the glyph should be mirrored when written R-to-L. The property Bidi_Mirroring_Glyph=U+hhhh can then point to the mirrored character. For example, parentheses (, ) are mirrored this way. Shaping cursive scripts such as Arabic, and mirroring glyphs that have a direction, is not part of the algorithm.

The properties of the semantic elements Bidi_Class and Bidi_Mirrored are displayed as:

- bc = bidi (bidirectional) category [L, R, AL, EN etc]
- bm = bidi mirrored [N or Y]

== Numeric values and types ==
=== Decimal ===
Characters are classified with a Numeric type. Characters such as fractions, subscripts, superscripts, Roman numerals, currency numerators, encircled numbers, and script-specific digits are type Numeric. They have a numeric value that can be decimal, including zero and negatives, or a vulgar fraction. If there is not such a value, as with most of the characters, the numeric type is "None".

The characters that do have a numeric value are separated in three groups: Decimal (De), Digit (Di) and Numeric (Nu, i.e. all other). "Decimal" means the character is a straight decimal digit. Only characters that are part of a contiguous encoded range 0..9 have numeric type Decimal. Other digits, like superscripts, have numeric type Digit. All numeric characters like fractions and Roman numerals end up with the type "Numeric". The intended effect is that a simple parser can use these decimal numeric values, without being distracted by say a numeric superscript or a fraction. Eighty-five CJK Ideographs that represent a number, including those used for accounting, are typed Numeric.

On the other hand, characters that could have a numeric value as a second meaning are still marked Numeric type None, and have no numeric value. E.g. Latin letters can be used in paragraph numbering like "II.A.1.b", but the letters "I", "A" and "b" are not numeric (type None) and have no numeric value.

Numeric Type^{[a]}^{[b]} (Unicode character property)
| Numeric type | Code | Has numeric value | Example | Remarks |
|---|---|---|---|---|
| Not numeric | <none> | No | A; X (Latin); !; Д; μ; に | Numeric Value="NaN" |
| Decimal | De | Yes | 0; 1; 9; ६ (Devanagari 6); ೬ (Kannada 6); 𝟨 (Mathematical, styled sans serif) | Straight digit (decimal-radix). Corresponds both ways with General Category=Nd^{[a]} |
| Digit | Di | Yes | ¹ (superscript); ①; ⒈ (digit with full stop) | Decimal, but in typographic context |
| Numeric | Nu | Yes | ¾; ௰ (Tamil number ten); Ⅹ (Roman numeral); 六 (Han number 6) | Numeric value, but not decimal-radix |
a. "Section 4.6: Numeric Value". The Unicode Standard. Unicode Consortium. September 2025.
b. "Unicode Derived Numeric Types". Unicode Character Database. Unicode Consortium. 2025-06-30.

=== Hexadecimal digits ===
Hexadecimal characters are those in the series with hexadecimal values 0123456789ABCDEF (sixteen characters, decimal value 0–15). The character property Hex_Digit is set to Yes when a character is in such a series:

Characters in Unicode marked Hex_Digit=Yes^{[a]}
| 0123456789ABCDEF | Basic Latin, capitals | Also ASCII_Hex_Digit=Yes |
| 0123456789abcdef | Basic Latin, small letters | Also ASCII_Hex_Digit=Yes |
| ０１２３４５６７８９ＡＢＣＤＥＦ | Fullwidth forms, capitals | |
| ０１２３４５６７８９ａｂｃｄｅｆ | Fullwidth forms, small letters | |
a. "Unicode 17.0 UCD: PropList.txt". 2025-06-30.

Forty-four characters are marked as Hex_Digit. The ones in the Basic Latin block are also marked as ASCII_Hex_Digit.

Unicode has no separate characters for hexadecimal values. A consequence is, that when using regular characters it is not possible to determine whether hexadecimal value is intended, or even whether a value is intended at all. That should be determined at a higher level, e.g. by prepending 0x to a hexadecimal number or by context. The only feature is that Unicode can note that a sequence can or can not be a hexadecimal value.

== Block ==
A block is a uniquely named, contiguous range of code points. It is identified by its first and last code point. Blocks do not overlap, nor do they extend across planes. The number of code points in each block must be a multiple of 16. A block may contain code points that are reserved, not-assigned, etc. Each character that is assigned, has a single "block name" value from the 353 names assigned as of Unicode version 18.0. Unassigned code points outside of an existing block have the default value "No_block".

Unicode blocks and contained scripts
| Plane | Block range | Block name | Code points (Note: Code point count includes unassigned code points: noncharacter, reserved etc.) | Assigned characters | Scripts (Note: The script has one or multiple characters in the block, as defined by the Script Property. This is independent of the block name) (Note: "Common" and "Unknown" (Zyyy) and "Inherited" (Zinh or Qaai) refer to Scripts in ISO 15924) (Note: Unicode Blocks data file. As of Unicode version 18.0) (Note: UAX 24: Unicode Script Property (4 alpha code)) (Note: UAX 24: Script data file) |
|---|---|---|---|---|---|
| 0 BMP | U+0000..U+007F | Basic Latin (Note: Called "C0 Controls and Basic Latin" in ISO/IEC 10646) | 128 | 128 | Latin (52 characters), Common (76 characters) |
| 0 BMP | U+0080..U+00FF | Latin-1 Supplement (Note: Called "C1 Controls and Latin-1 Supplement" in ISO/IEC 10646) | 128 | 128 | Latin (64 characters), Common (64 characters) |
| 0 BMP | U+0100..U+017F | Latin Extended-A | 128 | 128 | Latin |
| 0 BMP | U+0180..U+024F | Latin Extended-B | 208 | 208 | Latin |
| 0 BMP | U+0250..U+02AF | IPA Extensions | 96 | 96 | Latin |
| 0 BMP | U+02B0..U+02FF | Spacing Modifier Letters | 80 | 80 | Bopomofo (2 characters), Latin (14 characters), Common (64 characters) |
| 0 BMP | U+0300..U+036F | Combining Diacritical Marks | 112 | 112 | Inherited |
| 0 BMP | U+0370..U+03FF | Greek and Coptic | 144 | 135 | Coptic (14 characters), Greek (117 characters), Common (4 characters) |
| 0 BMP | U+0400..U+04FF | Cyrillic | 256 | 256 | Cyrillic (254 characters), Inherited (2 characters) |
| 0 BMP | U+0500..U+052F | Cyrillic Supplement | 48 | 48 | Cyrillic |
| 0 BMP | U+0530..U+058F | Armenian | 96 | 94 | Armenian |
| 0 BMP | U+0590..U+05FF | Hebrew | 112 | 90 | Hebrew |
| 0 BMP | U+0600..U+06FF | Arabic | 256 | 256 | Arabic (238 characters), Common (6 characters), Inherited (12 characters) |
| 0 BMP | U+0700..U+074F | Syriac | 80 | 77 | Syriac |
| 0 BMP | U+0750..U+077F | Arabic Supplement | 48 | 48 | Arabic |
| 0 BMP | U+0780..U+07BF | Thaana | 64 | 50 | Thaana |
| 0 BMP | U+07C0..U+07FF | NKo | 64 | 62 | N’Ko |
| 0 BMP | U+0800..U+083F | Samaritan | 64 | 61 | Samaritan |
| 0 BMP | U+0840..U+085F | Mandaic | 32 | 29 | Mandaic |
| 0 BMP | U+0860..U+086F | Syriac Supplement | 16 | 11 | Syriac |
| 0 BMP | U+0870..U+089F | Arabic Extended-B | 48 | 43 | Arabic |
| 0 BMP | U+08A0..U+08FF | Arabic Extended-A | 96 | 96 | Arabic (95 characters), Common (1 character) |
| 0 BMP | U+0900..U+097F | Devanagari | 128 | 128 | Devanagari (122 characters), Common (2 characters), Inherited (4 characters) |
| 0 BMP | U+0980..U+09FF | Bengali | 128 | 96 | Bengali |
| 0 BMP | U+0A00..U+0A7F | Gurmukhi | 128 | 80 | Gurmukhi |
| 0 BMP | U+0A80..U+0AFF | Gujarati | 128 | 91 | Gujarati |
| 0 BMP | U+0B00..U+0B7F | Oriya | 128 | 93 | Oriya |
| 0 BMP | U+0B80..U+0BFF | Tamil | 128 | 72 | Tamil |
| 0 BMP | U+0C00..U+0C7F | Telugu | 128 | 101 | Telugu |
| 0 BMP | U+0C80..U+0CFF | Kannada | 128 | 92 | Kannada |
| 0 BMP | U+0D00..U+0D7F | Malayalam | 128 | 118 | Malayalam |
| 0 BMP | U+0D80..U+0DFF | Sinhala | 128 | 91 | Sinhala |
| 0 BMP | U+0E00..U+0E7F | Thai | 128 | 87 | Thai (86 characters), Common (1 character) |
| 0 BMP | U+0E80..U+0EFF | Lao | 128 | 83 | Lao |
| 0 BMP | U+0F00..U+0FFF | Tibetan | 256 | 211 | Tibetan (207 characters), Common (4 characters) |
| 0 BMP | U+1000..U+109F | Myanmar | 160 | 160 | Myanmar |
| 0 BMP | U+10A0..U+10FF | Georgian | 96 | 88 | Georgian (87 characters), Common (1 character) |
| 0 BMP | U+1100..U+11FF | Hangul Jamo | 256 | 256 | Hangul |
| 0 BMP | U+1200..U+137F | Ethiopic | 384 | 358 | Ethiopic |
| 0 BMP | U+1380..U+139F | Ethiopic Supplement | 32 | 26 | Ethiopic |
| 0 BMP | U+13A0..U+13FF | Cherokee | 96 | 92 | Cherokee |
| 0 BMP | U+1400..U+167F | Unified Canadian Aboriginal Syllabics | 640 | 640 | Canadian Aboriginal |
| 0 BMP | U+1680..U+169F | Ogham | 32 | 29 | Ogham |
| 0 BMP | U+16A0..U+16FF | Runic | 96 | 89 | Runic (86 characters), Common (3 characters) |
| 0 BMP | U+1700..U+171F | Tagalog | 32 | 23 | Tagalog |
| 0 BMP | U+1720..U+173F | Hanunoo | 32 | 23 | Hanunoo (21 characters), Common (2 characters) |
| 0 BMP | U+1740..U+175F | Buhid | 32 | 20 | Buhid |
| 0 BMP | U+1760..U+177F | Tagbanwa | 32 | 18 | Tagbanwa |
| 0 BMP | U+1780..U+17FF | Khmer | 128 | 114 | Khmer |
| 0 BMP | U+1800..U+18AF | Mongolian | 176 | 158 | Mongolian (155 characters), Common (3 characters) |
| 0 BMP | U+18B0..U+18FF | Unified Canadian Aboriginal Syllabics Extended | 80 | 70 | Canadian Aboriginal |
| 0 BMP | U+1900..U+194F | Limbu | 80 | 68 | Limbu |
| 0 BMP | U+1950..U+197F | Tai Le | 48 | 35 | Tai Le |
| 0 BMP | U+1980..U+19DF | New Tai Lue | 96 | 83 | New Tai Lue |
| 0 BMP | U+19E0..U+19FF | Khmer Symbols | 32 | 32 | Khmer |
| 0 BMP | U+1A00..U+1A1F | Buginese | 32 | 30 | Buginese |
| 0 BMP | U+1A20..U+1AAF | Tai Tham | 144 | 127 | Tai Tham |
| 0 BMP | U+1AB0..U+1AFF | Combining Diacritical Marks Extended | 80 | 65 | Inherited |
| 0 BMP | U+1B00..U+1B7F | Balinese | 128 | 127 | Balinese |
| 0 BMP | U+1B80..U+1BBF | Sundanese | 64 | 64 | Sundanese |
| 0 BMP | U+1BC0..U+1BFF | Batak | 64 | 56 | Batak |
| 0 BMP | U+1C00..U+1C4F | Lepcha | 80 | 74 | Lepcha |
| 0 BMP | U+1C50..U+1C7F | Ol Chiki | 48 | 48 | Ol Chiki |
| 0 BMP | U+1C80..U+1C8F | Cyrillic Extended-C | 16 | 11 | Cyrillic |
| 0 BMP | U+1C90..U+1CBF | Georgian Extended | 48 | 46 | Georgian |
| 0 BMP | U+1CC0..U+1CCF | Sundanese Supplement | 16 | 8 | Sundanese |
| 0 BMP | U+1CD0..U+1CFF | Vedic Extensions | 48 | 43 | Common (16 characters), Inherited (27 characters) |
| 0 BMP | U+1D00..U+1D7F | Phonetic Extensions | 128 | 128 | Cyrillic (2 characters), Greek (15 characters), Latin (111 characters) |
| 0 BMP | U+1D80..U+1DBF | Phonetic Extensions Supplement | 64 | 64 | Greek (1 character), Latin (63 characters) |
| 0 BMP | U+1DC0..U+1DFF | Combining Diacritical Marks Supplement | 64 | 64 | Inherited |
| 0 BMP | U+1E00..U+1EFF | Latin Extended Additional | 256 | 256 | Latin |
| 0 BMP | U+1F00..U+1FFF | Greek Extended | 256 | 233 | Greek |
| 0 BMP | U+2000..U+206F | General Punctuation | 112 | 111 | Common (109 characters), Inherited (2 characters) |
| 0 BMP | U+2070..U+209F | Superscripts and Subscripts | 48 | 46 | Latin (18 characters), Common (28 characters) |
| 0 BMP | U+20A0..U+20CF | Currency Symbols | 48 | 37 | Common |
| 0 BMP | U+20D0..U+20FF | Combining Diacritical Marks for Symbols | 48 | 33 | Inherited |
| 0 BMP | U+2100..U+214F | Letterlike Symbols | 80 | 80 | Greek (1 character), Latin (4 characters), Common (75 characters) |
| 0 BMP | U+2150..U+218F | Number Forms | 64 | 60 | Latin (41 characters), Common (19 characters) |
| 0 BMP | U+2190..U+21FF | Arrows | 112 | 112 | Common |
| 0 BMP | U+2200..U+22FF | Mathematical Operators | 256 | 256 | Common |
| 0 BMP | U+2300..U+23FF | Miscellaneous Technical | 256 | 256 | Common |
| 0 BMP | U+2400..U+243F | Control Pictures | 64 | 42 | Common |
| 0 BMP | U+2440..U+245F | Optical Character Recognition | 32 | 11 | Common |
| 0 BMP | U+2460..U+24FF | Enclosed Alphanumerics | 160 | 160 | Common |
| 0 BMP | U+2500..U+257F | Box Drawing | 128 | 128 | Common |
| 0 BMP | U+2580..U+259F | Block Elements | 32 | 32 | Common |
| 0 BMP | U+25A0..U+25FF | Geometric Shapes | 96 | 96 | Common |
| 0 BMP | U+2600..U+26FF | Miscellaneous Symbols | 256 | 256 | Common |
| 0 BMP | U+2700..U+27BF | Dingbats | 192 | 192 | Common |
| 0 BMP | U+27C0..U+27EF | Miscellaneous Mathematical Symbols-A | 48 | 48 | Common |
| 0 BMP | U+27F0..U+27FF | Supplemental Arrows-A | 16 | 16 | Common |
| 0 BMP | U+2800..U+28FF | Braille Patterns | 256 | 256 | Braille |
| 0 BMP | U+2900..U+297F | Supplemental Arrows-B | 128 | 128 | Common |
| 0 BMP | U+2980..U+29FF | Miscellaneous Mathematical Symbols-B | 128 | 128 | Common |
| 0 BMP | U+2A00..U+2AFF | Supplemental Mathematical Operators | 256 | 256 | Common |
| 0 BMP | U+2B00..U+2BFF | Miscellaneous Symbols and Arrows | 256 | 254 | Common |
| 0 BMP | U+2C00..U+2C5F | Glagolitic | 96 | 96 | Glagolitic |
| 0 BMP | U+2C60..U+2C7F | Latin Extended-C | 32 | 32 | Latin |
| 0 BMP | U+2C80..U+2CFF | Coptic | 128 | 123 | Coptic |
| 0 BMP | U+2D00..U+2D2F | Georgian Supplement | 48 | 40 | Georgian |
| 0 BMP | U+2D30..U+2D7F | Tifinagh | 80 | 59 | Tifinagh |
| 0 BMP | U+2D80..U+2DDF | Ethiopic Extended | 96 | 79 | Ethiopic |
| 0 BMP | U+2DE0..U+2DFF | Cyrillic Extended-A | 32 | 32 | Cyrillic |
| 0 BMP | U+2E00..U+2E7F | Supplemental Punctuation | 128 | 98 | Common |
| 0 BMP | U+2E80..U+2EFF | CJK Radicals Supplement | 128 | 115 | Han |
| 0 BMP | U+2F00..U+2FDF | Kangxi Radicals | 224 | 214 | Han |
| 0 BMP | U+2FF0..U+2FFF | Ideographic Description Characters | 16 | 16 | Common |
| 0 BMP | U+3000..U+303F | CJK Symbols and Punctuation | 64 | 64 | Han (15 characters), Hangul (2 characters), Common (43 characters), Inherited (4 characters) |
| 0 BMP | U+3040..U+309F | Hiragana | 96 | 93 | Hiragana (89 characters), Common (2 characters), Inherited (2 characters) |
| 0 BMP | U+30A0..U+30FF | Katakana | 96 | 96 | Katakana (93 characters), Common (3 characters) |
| 0 BMP | U+3100..U+312F | Bopomofo | 48 | 43 | Bopomofo |
| 0 BMP | U+3130..U+318F | Hangul Compatibility Jamo | 96 | 94 | Hangul |
| 0 BMP | U+3190..U+319F | Kanbun | 16 | 16 | Common |
| 0 BMP | U+31A0..U+31BF | Bopomofo Extended | 32 | 32 | Bopomofo |
| 0 BMP | U+31C0..U+31EF | CJK Strokes | 48 | 39 | Common |
| 0 BMP | U+31F0..U+31FF | Katakana Phonetic Extensions | 16 | 16 | Katakana |
| 0 BMP | U+3200..U+32FF | Enclosed CJK Letters and Months | 256 | 255 | Hangul (62 characters), Katakana (47 characters), Common (146 characters) |
| 0 BMP | U+3300..U+33FF | CJK Compatibility | 256 | 256 | Katakana (88 characters), Common (168 characters) |
| 0 BMP | U+3400..U+4DBF | CJK Unified Ideographs Extension A | 6,592 | 6,592 | Han |
| 0 BMP | U+4DC0..U+4DFF | Yijing Hexagram Symbols | 64 | 64 | Common |
| 0 BMP | U+4E00..U+9FFF | CJK Unified Ideographs | 20,992 | 20,992 | Han |
| 0 BMP | U+A000..U+A48F | Yi Syllables | 1,168 | 1,165 | Yi |
| 0 BMP | U+A490..U+A4CF | Yi Radicals | 64 | 55 | Yi |
| 0 BMP | U+A4D0..U+A4FF | Lisu | 48 | 48 | Lisu |
| 0 BMP | U+A500..U+A63F | Vai | 320 | 300 | Vai |
| 0 BMP | U+A640..U+A69F | Cyrillic Extended-B | 96 | 96 | Cyrillic |
| 0 BMP | U+A6A0..U+A6FF | Bamum | 96 | 88 | Bamum |
| 0 BMP | U+A700..U+A71F | Modifier Tone Letters | 32 | 32 | Common |
| 0 BMP | U+A720..U+A7FF | Latin Extended-D | 224 | 206 | Latin (201 characters), Common (5 characters) |
| 0 BMP | U+A800..U+A82F | Syloti Nagri | 48 | 45 | Syloti Nagri |
| 0 BMP | U+A830..U+A83F | Common Indic Number Forms | 16 | 10 | Common |
| 0 BMP | U+A840..U+A87F | Phags-pa | 64 | 56 | Phags Pa |
| 0 BMP | U+A880..U+A8DF | Saurashtra | 96 | 82 | Saurashtra |
| 0 BMP | U+A8E0..U+A8FF | Devanagari Extended | 32 | 32 | Devanagari |
| 0 BMP | U+A900..U+A92F | Kayah Li | 48 | 48 | Kayah Li (47 characters), Common (1 character) |
| 0 BMP | U+A930..U+A95F | Rejang | 48 | 37 | Rejang |
| 0 BMP | U+A960..U+A97F | Hangul Jamo Extended-A | 32 | 29 | Hangul |
| 0 BMP | U+A980..U+A9DF | Javanese | 96 | 91 | Javanese (90 characters), Common (1 character) |
| 0 BMP | U+A9E0..U+A9FF | Myanmar Extended-B | 32 | 31 | Myanmar |
| 0 BMP | U+AA00..U+AA5F | Cham | 96 | 83 | Cham |
| 0 BMP | U+AA60..U+AA7F | Myanmar Extended-A | 32 | 32 | Myanmar |
| 0 BMP | U+AA80..U+AADF | Tai Viet | 96 | 72 | Tai Viet |
| 0 BMP | U+AAE0..U+AAFF | Meetei Mayek Extensions | 32 | 23 | Meetei Mayek |
| 0 BMP | U+AB00..U+AB2F | Ethiopic Extended-A | 48 | 32 | Ethiopic |
| 0 BMP | U+AB30..U+AB6F | Latin Extended-E | 64 | 62 | Latin (58 characters), Greek (1 character), Common (3 characters) |
| 0 BMP | U+AB70..U+ABBF | Cherokee Supplement | 80 | 80 | Cherokee |
| 0 BMP | U+ABC0..U+ABFF | Meetei Mayek | 64 | 56 | Meetei Mayek |
| 0 BMP | U+AC00..U+D7AF | Hangul Syllables | 11,184 | 11,172 | Hangul |
| 0 BMP | U+D7B0..U+D7FF | Hangul Jamo Extended-B | 80 | 72 | Hangul |
| 0 BMP | U+D800..U+DB7F | High Surrogates | 896 | 0 | Unknown |
| 0 BMP | U+DB80..U+DBFF | High Private Use Surrogates | 128 | 0 | Unknown |
| 0 BMP | U+DC00..U+DFFF | Low Surrogates | 1,024 | 0 | Unknown |
| 0 BMP | U+E000..U+F8FF | Private Use Area | 6,400 | 6,400 | Unknown |
| 0 BMP | U+F900..U+FAFF | CJK Compatibility Ideographs | 512 | 472 | Han |
| 0 BMP | U+FB00..U+FB4F | Alphabetic Presentation Forms | 80 | 58 | Armenian (5 characters), Hebrew (46 characters), Latin (7 characters) |
| 0 BMP | U+FB50..U+FDFF | Arabic Presentation Forms-A | 688 | 656 | Arabic (654 characters), Common (2 characters) |
| 0 BMP | U+FE00..U+FE0F | Variation Selectors | 16 | 16 | Inherited |
| 0 BMP | U+FE10..U+FE1F | Vertical Forms | 16 | 10 | Common |
| 0 BMP | U+FE20..U+FE2F | Combining Half Marks | 16 | 16 | Cyrillic (2 characters), Inherited (14 characters) |
| 0 BMP | U+FE30..U+FE4F | CJK Compatibility Forms | 32 | 32 | Common |
| 0 BMP | U+FE50..U+FE6F | Small Form Variants | 32 | 26 | Common |
| 0 BMP | U+FE70..U+FEFF | Arabic Presentation Forms-B | 144 | 141 | Arabic (140 characters), Common (1 character) |
| 0 BMP | U+FF00..U+FFEF | Halfwidth and Fullwidth Forms | 240 | 225 | Hangul (52 characters), Katakana (55 characters), Latin (52 characters), Common (66 characters) |
| 0 BMP | U+FFF0..U+FFFF | Specials | 16 | 5 | Common |
| 1 SMP | U+10000..U+1007F | Linear B Syllabary | 128 | 88 | Linear B |
| 1 SMP | U+10080..U+100FF | Linear B Ideograms | 128 | 123 | Linear B |
| 1 SMP | U+10100..U+1013F | Aegean Numbers | 64 | 57 | Common |
| 1 SMP | U+10140..U+1018F | Ancient Greek Numbers | 80 | 79 | Greek |
| 1 SMP | U+10190..U+101CF | Ancient Symbols | 64 | 14 | Greek (1 character), Common (13 characters) |
| 1 SMP | U+101D0..U+101FF | Phaistos Disc | 48 | 46 | Common (45 characters), Inherited (1 character) |
| 1 SMP | U+10280..U+1029F | Lycian | 32 | 29 | Lycian |
| 1 SMP | U+102A0..U+102DF | Carian | 64 | 49 | Carian |
| 1 SMP | U+102E0..U+102FF | Coptic Epact Numbers | 32 | 28 | Common (27 characters), Inherited (1 character) |
| 1 SMP | U+10300..U+1032F | Old Italic | 48 | 39 | Old Italic |
| 1 SMP | U+10330..U+1034F | Gothic | 32 | 27 | Gothic |
| 1 SMP | U+10350..U+1037F | Old Permic | 48 | 43 | Old Permic |
| 1 SMP | U+10380..U+1039F | Ugaritic | 32 | 31 | Ugaritic |
| 1 SMP | U+103A0..U+103DF | Old Persian | 64 | 50 | Old Persian |
| 1 SMP | U+10400..U+1044F | Deseret | 80 | 80 | Deseret |
| 1 SMP | U+10450..U+1047F | Shavian | 48 | 48 | Shavian |
| 1 SMP | U+10480..U+104AF | Osmanya | 48 | 40 | Osmanya |
| 1 SMP | U+104B0..U+104FF | Osage | 80 | 72 | Osage |
| 1 SMP | U+10500..U+1052F | Elbasan | 48 | 40 | Elbasan |
| 1 SMP | U+10530..U+1056F | Caucasian Albanian | 64 | 53 | Caucasian Albanian |
| 1 SMP | U+10570..U+105BF | Vithkuqi | 80 | 70 | Vithkuqi |
| 1 SMP | U+105C0..U+105FF | Todhri | 64 | 52 | Todhri |
| 1 SMP | U+10600..U+1077F | Linear A | 384 | 341 | Linear A |
| 1 SMP | U+10780..U+107BF | Latin Extended-F | 64 | 62 | Latin |
| 1 SMP | U+10800..U+1083F | Cypriot Syllabary | 64 | 55 | Cypriot |
| 1 SMP | U+10840..U+1085F | Imperial Aramaic | 32 | 31 | Imperial Aramaic |
| 1 SMP | U+10860..U+1087F | Palmyrene | 32 | 32 | Palmyrene |
| 1 SMP | U+10880..U+108AF | Nabataean | 48 | 40 | Nabataean |
| 1 SMP | U+108E0..U+108FF | Hatran | 32 | 26 | Hatran |
| 1 SMP | U+10900..U+1091F | Phoenician | 32 | 29 | Phoenician |
| 1 SMP | U+10920..U+1093F | Lydian | 32 | 27 | Lydian |
| 1 SMP | U+10940..U+1095F | Sidetic | 32 | 26 | Sidetic |
| 1 SMP | U+10980..U+1099F | Meroitic Hieroglyphs | 32 | 32 | Meroitic Hieroglyphs |
| 1 SMP | U+109A0..U+109FF | Meroitic Cursive | 96 | 90 | Meroitic Cursive |
| 1 SMP | U+10A00..U+10A5F | Kharoshthi | 96 | 68 | Kharoshthi |
| 1 SMP | U+10A60..U+10A7F | Old South Arabian | 32 | 32 | Old South Arabian |
| 1 SMP | U+10A80..U+10A9F | Old North Arabian | 32 | 32 | Old North Arabian |
| 1 SMP | U+10AC0..U+10AFF | Manichaean | 64 | 51 | Manichaean |
| 1 SMP | U+10B00..U+10B3F | Avestan | 64 | 61 | Avestan |
| 1 SMP | U+10B40..U+10B5F | Inscriptional Parthian | 32 | 30 | Inscriptional Parthian |
| 1 SMP | U+10B60..U+10B7F | Inscriptional Pahlavi | 32 | 27 | Inscriptional Pahlavi |
| 1 SMP | U+10B80..U+10BAF | Psalter Pahlavi | 48 | 29 | Psalter Pahlavi |
| 1 SMP | U+10C00..U+10C4F | Old Turkic | 80 | 73 | Old Turkic |
| 1 SMP | U+10C80..U+10CFF | Old Hungarian | 128 | 108 | Old Hungarian |
| 1 SMP | U+10D00..U+10D3F | Hanifi Rohingya | 64 | 50 | Hanifi Rohingya |
| 1 SMP | U+10D40..U+10D8F | Garay | 80 | 69 | Garay |
| 1 SMP | U+10E60..U+10E7F | Rumi Numeral Symbols | 32 | 31 | Arabic |
| 1 SMP | U+10E80..U+10EBF | Yezidi | 64 | 47 | Yezidi |
| 1 SMP | U+10EC0..U+10EFF | Arabic Extended-C | 64 | 60 | Arabic |
| 1 SMP | U+10F00..U+10F2F | Old Sogdian | 48 | 40 | Old Sogdian |
| 1 SMP | U+10F30..U+10F6F | Sogdian | 64 | 42 | Sogdian |
| 1 SMP | U+10F70..U+10FAF | Old Uyghur | 64 | 26 | Old Uyghur |
| 1 SMP | U+10FB0..U+10FDF | Chorasmian | 48 | 28 | Chorasmian |
| 1 SMP | U+10FE0..U+10FFF | Elymaic | 32 | 23 | Elymaic |
| 1 SMP | U+11000..U+1107F | Brahmi | 128 | 115 | Brahmi |
| 1 SMP | U+11080..U+110CF | Kaithi | 80 | 68 | Kaithi |
| 1 SMP | U+110D0..U+110FF | Sora Sompeng | 48 | 35 | Sora Sompeng |
| 1 SMP | U+11100..U+1114F | Chakma | 80 | 71 | Chakma |
| 1 SMP | U+11150..U+1117F | Mahajani | 48 | 39 | Mahajani |
| 1 SMP | U+11180..U+111DF | Sharada | 96 | 96 | Sharada |
| 1 SMP | U+111E0..U+111FF | Sinhala Archaic Numbers | 32 | 20 | Sinhala |
| 1 SMP | U+11200..U+1124F | Khojki | 80 | 65 | Khojki |
| 1 SMP | U+11280..U+112AF | Multani | 48 | 38 | Multani |
| 1 SMP | U+112B0..U+112FF | Khudawadi | 80 | 69 | Khudawadi |
| 1 SMP | U+11300..U+1137F | Grantha | 128 | 86 | Grantha (85 characters), Inherited (1 character) |
| 1 SMP | U+11380..U+113FF | Tulu-Tigalari | 128 | 80 | Tulu Tigalari |
| 1 SMP | U+11400..U+1147F | Newa | 128 | 97 | Newa |
| 1 SMP | U+11480..U+114DF | Tirhuta | 96 | 82 | Tirhuta |
| 1 SMP | U+11580..U+115FF | Siddham | 128 | 92 | Siddham |
| 1 SMP | U+11600..U+1165F | Modi | 96 | 79 | Modi |
| 1 SMP | U+11660..U+1167F | Mongolian Supplement | 32 | 13 | Mongolian |
| 1 SMP | U+11680..U+116CF | Takri | 80 | 68 | Takri |
| 1 SMP | U+116D0..U+116FF | Myanmar Extended-C | 48 | 20 | Myanmar |
| 1 SMP | U+11700..U+1174F | Ahom | 80 | 65 | Ahom |
| 1 SMP | U+11800..U+1184F | Dogra | 80 | 60 | Dogra |
| 1 SMP | U+118A0..U+118FF | Warang Citi | 96 | 84 | Warang Citi |
| 1 SMP | U+11900..U+1195F | Dives Akuru | 96 | 72 | Dives Akuru |
| 1 SMP | U+119A0..U+119FF | Nandinagari | 96 | 65 | Nandinagari |
| 1 SMP | U+11A00..U+11A4F | Zanabazar Square | 80 | 72 | Zanabazar Square |
| 1 SMP | U+11A50..U+11AAF | Soyombo | 96 | 83 | Soyombo |
| 1 SMP | U+11AB0..U+11ABF | Unified Canadian Aboriginal Syllabics Extended-A | 16 | 16 | Canadian Aboriginal |
| 1 SMP | U+11AC0..U+11AFF | Pau Cin Hau | 64 | 57 | Pau Cin Hau |
| 1 SMP | U+11B00..U+11B5F | Devanagari Extended-A | 96 | 11 | Devanagari |
| 1 SMP | U+11B60..U+11B7F | Sharada Supplement | 32 | 8 | Sharada |
| 1 SMP | U+11BC0..U+11BFF | Sunuwar | 64 | 44 | Sunuwar |
| 1 SMP | U+11C00..U+11C6F | Bhaiksuki | 112 | 97 | Bhaiksuki |
| 1 SMP | U+11C70..U+11CBF | Marchen | 80 | 68 | Marchen |
| 1 SMP | U+11D00..U+11D5F | Masaram Gondi | 96 | 75 | Masaram Gondi |
| 1 SMP | U+11D60..U+11DAF | Gunjala Gondi | 80 | 63 | Gunjala Gondi |
| 1 SMP | U+11DB0..U+11DEF | Tolong Siki | 64 | 54 | Tolong Siki |
| 1 SMP | U+11DF0..U+11DFF | Bengali Supplement | 16 | 2 | Bengali |
| 1 SMP | U+11EE0..U+11EFF | Makasar | 32 | 25 | Makasar |
| 1 SMP | U+11F00..U+11F5F | Kawi | 96 | 87 | Kawi |
| 1 SMP | U+11FB0..U+11FBF | Lisu Supplement | 16 | 1 | Lisu |
| 1 SMP | U+11FC0..U+11FFF | Tamil Supplement | 64 | 51 | Tamil |
| 1 SMP | U+12000..U+123FF | Cuneiform | 1,024 | 922 | Cuneiform |
| 1 SMP | U+12400..U+1247F | Cuneiform Numbers and Punctuation | 128 | 128 | Cuneiform |
| 1 SMP | U+12480..U+1254F | Early Dynastic Cuneiform | 208 | 196 | Cuneiform |
| 1 SMP | U+12550..U+1268F | Archaic Cuneiform Numerals | 320 | 311 | Cuneiform (147 characters), Proto Cuneiform (164 characters) |
| 1 SMP | U+12F90..U+12FFF | Cypro-Minoan | 112 | 99 | Cypro Minoan |
| 1 SMP | U+13000..U+1342F | Egyptian Hieroglyphs | 1,072 | 1,072 | Egyptian Hieroglyphs |
| 1 SMP | U+13430..U+1345F | Egyptian Hieroglyph Format Controls | 48 | 38 | Egyptian Hieroglyphs |
| 1 SMP | U+13460..U+143FF | Egyptian Hieroglyphs Extended-A | 4,000 | 3,995 | Egyptian Hieroglyphs |
| 1 SMP | U+14400..U+1467F | Anatolian Hieroglyphs | 640 | 583 | Anatolian Hieroglyphs |
| 1 SMP | U+16100..U+1613F | Gurung Khema | 64 | 58 | Gurung Khema |
| 1 SMP | U+16800..U+16A3F | Bamum Supplement | 576 | 569 | Bamum |
| 1 SMP | U+16A40..U+16A6F | Mro | 48 | 43 | Mro |
| 1 SMP | U+16A70..U+16ACF | Tangsa | 96 | 89 | Tangsa |
| 1 SMP | U+16AD0..U+16AFF | Bassa Vah | 48 | 36 | Bassa Vah |
| 1 SMP | U+16B00..U+16B8F | Pahawh Hmong | 144 | 127 | Pahawh Hmong |
| 1 SMP | U+16D40..U+16D7F | Kirat Rai | 64 | 58 | Kirat Rai |
| 1 SMP | U+16E40..U+16E9F | Medefaidrin | 96 | 91 | Medefaidrin |
| 1 SMP | U+16EA0..U+16EDF | Beria Erfe | 64 | 50 | Beria Erfe |
| 1 SMP | U+16F00..U+16F9F | Miao | 160 | 149 | Miao |
| 1 SMP | U+16FE0..U+16FFF | Ideographic Symbols and Punctuation | 32 | 12 | Han (9 characters), Khitan Small Script (1 character), Nushu (1 character), Tangut (1 character) |
| 1 SMP | U+17000..U+187FF | Tangut | 6,144 | 6,144 | Tangut |
| 1 SMP | U+18800..U+18AFF | Tangut Components | 768 | 768 | Tangut |
| 1 SMP | U+18B00..U+18CFF | Khitan Small Script | 512 | 476 | Khitan Small Script |
| 1 SMP | U+18D00..U+18D7F | Tangut Supplement | 128 | 33 | Tangut |
| 1 SMP | U+18D80..U+18DFF | Tangut Components Supplement | 128 | 115 | Tangut |
| 1 SMP | U+18E00..U+1919F | Jurchen | 928 | 914 | Jurchen |
| 1 SMP | U+191A0..U+191DF | Jurchen Radicals | 64 | 51 | Jurchen |
| 1 SMP | U+1AFF0..U+1AFFF | Kana Extended-B | 16 | 13 | Katakana |
| 1 SMP | U+1B000..U+1B0FF | Kana Supplement | 256 | 256 | Hiragana (255 characters), Katakana (1 character) |
| 1 SMP | U+1B100..U+1B12F | Kana Extended-A | 48 | 41 | Hiragana (33 characters), Katakana (8 characters) |
| 1 SMP | U+1B130..U+1B16F | Small Kana Extension | 64 | 10 | Hiragana (4 characters), Katakana (6 characters) |
| 1 SMP | U+1B170..U+1B2FF | Nushu | 400 | 396 | Nüshu |
| 1 SMP | U+1BC00..U+1BC9F | Duployan | 160 | 143 | Duployan |
| 1 SMP | U+1BCA0..U+1BCAF | Shorthand Format Controls | 16 | 4 | Common |
| 1 SMP | U+1CC00..U+1CEBF | Symbols for Legacy Computing Supplement | 704 | 695 | Common |
| 1 SMP | U+1CEC0..U+1CEFF | Miscellaneous Symbols Supplement | 64 | 53 | Common |
| 1 SMP | U+1CF00..U+1CFCF | Znamenny Musical Notation | 208 | 185 | Common (116 characters), Inherited (69 characters) |
| 1 SMP | U+1D000..U+1D0FF | Byzantine Musical Symbols | 256 | 246 | Common |
| 1 SMP | U+1D100..U+1D1FF | Musical Symbols | 256 | 256 | Common (232 characters), Inherited (24 characters) |
| 1 SMP | U+1D200..U+1D24F | Ancient Greek Musical Notation | 80 | 70 | Greek |
| 1 SMP | U+1D250..U+1D28F | Musical Symbols Supplement | 64 | 50 | Common (48 characters), Inherited (2 characters) |
| 1 SMP | U+1D2C0..U+1D2DF | Kaktovik Numerals | 32 | 20 | Common |
| 1 SMP | U+1D2E0..U+1D2FF | Mayan Numerals | 32 | 20 | Common |
| 1 SMP | U+1D300..U+1D35F | Tai Xuan Jing Symbols | 96 | 87 | Common |
| 1 SMP | U+1D360..U+1D37F | Counting Rod Numerals | 32 | 25 | Common |
| 1 SMP | U+1D400..U+1D7FF | Mathematical Alphanumeric Symbols | 1,024 | 997 | Common |
| 1 SMP | U+1D800..U+1DAAF | Sutton SignWriting | 688 | 672 | SignWriting |
| 1 SMP | U+1DB00..U+1DBFF | Miscellaneous Symbols and Arrows Extended | 256 | 29 | Common |
| 1 SMP | U+1DF00..U+1DFFF | Latin Extended-G | 256 | 188 | Greek (2 characters), Latin (186 characters) |
| 1 SMP | U+1E000..U+1E02F | Glagolitic Supplement | 48 | 38 | Glagolitic |
| 1 SMP | U+1E030..U+1E08F | Cyrillic Extended-D | 96 | 63 | Cyrillic |
| 1 SMP | U+1E100..U+1E14F | Nyiakeng Puachue Hmong | 80 | 71 | Nyiakeng Puachue Hmong |
| 1 SMP | U+1E290..U+1E2BF | Toto | 48 | 31 | Toto |
| 1 SMP | U+1E2C0..U+1E2FF | Wancho | 64 | 59 | Wancho |
| 1 SMP | U+1E4D0..U+1E4FF | Nag Mundari | 48 | 42 | Mundari |
| 1 SMP | U+1E5D0..U+1E5FF | Ol Onal | 48 | 44 | Ol Onal |
| 1 SMP | U+1E6C0..U+1E6FF | Tai Yo | 64 | 55 | Tai Yo |
| 1 SMP | U+1E7E0..U+1E7FF | Ethiopic Extended-B | 32 | 28 | Ethiopic |
| 1 SMP | U+1E800..U+1E8DF | Mende Kikakui | 224 | 213 | Mende Kikakui |
| 1 SMP | U+1E900..U+1E95F | Adlam | 96 | 88 | Adlam |
| 1 SMP | U+1EC70..U+1ECBF | Indic Siyaq Numbers | 80 | 68 | Common |
| 1 SMP | U+1ED00..U+1ED4F | Ottoman Siyaq Numbers | 80 | 61 | Common |
| 1 SMP | U+1EE00..U+1EEFF | Arabic Mathematical Alphabetic Symbols | 256 | 143 | Arabic |
| 1 SMP | U+1F000..U+1F02F | Mahjong Tiles | 48 | 44 | Common |
| 1 SMP | U+1F030..U+1F09F | Domino Tiles | 112 | 100 | Common |
| 1 SMP | U+1F0A0..U+1F0FF | Playing Cards | 96 | 82 | Common |
| 1 SMP | U+1F100..U+1F1FF | Enclosed Alphanumeric Supplement | 256 | 201 | Common |
| 1 SMP | U+1F200..U+1F2FF | Enclosed Ideographic Supplement | 256 | 64 | Hiragana (1 character), Common (63 characters) |
| 1 SMP | U+1F300..U+1F5FF | Miscellaneous Symbols and Pictographs | 768 | 768 | Common |
| 1 SMP | U+1F600..U+1F64F | Emoticons | 80 | 80 | Common |
| 1 SMP | U+1F650..U+1F67F | Ornamental Dingbats | 48 | 48 | Common |
| 1 SMP | U+1F680..U+1F6FF | Transport and Map Symbols | 128 | 120 | Common |
| 1 SMP | U+1F700..U+1F77F | Alchemical Symbols | 128 | 128 | Common |
| 1 SMP | U+1F780..U+1F7FF | Geometric Shapes Extended | 128 | 120 | Common |
| 1 SMP | U+1F800..U+1F8FF | Supplemental Arrows-C | 256 | 171 | Common |
| 1 SMP | U+1F900..U+1F9FF | Supplemental Symbols and Pictographs | 256 | 256 | Common |
| 1 SMP | U+1FA00..U+1FA6F | Chess Symbols | 112 | 102 | Common |
| 1 SMP | U+1FA70..U+1FAFF | Symbols and Pictographs Extended-A | 144 | 128 | Common |
| 1 SMP | U+1FB00..U+1FBFF | Symbols for Legacy Computing | 256 | 250 | Common |
| 2 SIP | U+20000..U+2A6DF | CJK Unified Ideographs Extension B | 42,720 | 42,720 | Han |
| 2 SIP | U+2A700..U+2B73F | CJK Unified Ideographs Extension C | 4,160 | 4,160 | Han |
| 2 SIP | U+2B740..U+2B81F | CJK Unified Ideographs Extension D | 224 | 223 | Han |
| 2 SIP | U+2B820..U+2CEAF | CJK Unified Ideographs Extension E | 5,776 | 5,774 | Han |
| 2 SIP | U+2CEB0..U+2EBEF | CJK Unified Ideographs Extension F | 7,488 | 7,473 | Han |
| 2 SIP | U+2EBF0..U+2EE5F | CJK Unified Ideographs Extension I | 624 | 622 | Han |
| 2 SIP | U+2F800..U+2FA1F | CJK Compatibility Ideographs Supplement | 544 | 542 | Han |
| 3 TIP | U+30000..U+3134F | CJK Unified Ideographs Extension G | 4,944 | 4,939 | Han |
| 3 TIP | U+31350..U+323AF | CJK Unified Ideographs Extension H | 4,192 | 4,192 | Han |
| 3 TIP | U+323B0..U+3347F | CJK Unified Ideographs Extension J | 4,304 | 4,298 | Han |
| 3 TIP | U+3D000..U+3FC3F | Seal | 11,328 | 11,328 | Seal |
| 14 SSP | U+E0000..U+E007F | Tags | 128 | 97 | Common |
| 14 SSP | U+E0100..U+E01EF | Variation Selectors Supplement | 240 | 240 | Inherited |
| 15 PUA-A | U+F0000..U+FFFFF | Supplementary Private Use Area-A | 65,536 | 65,534 | Unknown |
| 16 PUA-B | U+100000..U+10FFFF | Supplementary Private Use Area-B | 65,536 | 65,534 | Unknown |

== Script ==
Each assigned character can have a single value for its "Script" property, signifying to which script it belongs. The value is a four-letter code in the range Aaaa-Zzzz, as available in ISO 15924, which is mapped to a writing system. Apart from when describing the background and usage of a script, Unicode does not use a connection between a script and languages that use that script. So "Hebrew" refers to the Hebrew script, not to the Hebrew language.

The special code Zyyy for "Common" allows a single value for a character that is used in multiple scripts. The code Zinh "Inherited script", used for combining characters and certain other special-purpose code points, indicates that a character "inherits" its script identity from the character with which it is combined. (Unicode formerly used the private code Qaai for this purpose.) The code Zzzz "Unknown" is used for all characters that do not belong to a script (i.e. the default value), such as symbols and formatting characters. Overall, characters of a single script can be scattered over multiple blocks, like Latin characters. And the other way around too: multiple scripts can be present is a single block, e.g. block Letterlike Symbols contains characters from the Latin, Greek and Common scripts.

When the Script is "" (blank), according to Unicode the character does not belong to a script. This pertains to symbols, because the existing ISO script codes "Zmth" (Mathematical notation), "Zsym" (Symbol), and "Zsye" (Symbol, emoji variant) are not used in Unicode. The "Script" property is also blank for code points that are not a typographic character like controls, substitutes, and private use code points.

If there is a specific script alias name in ISO 15924, it is used in the character name: U+0041 A LATIN CAPITAL LETTER A, and U+05D0 א HEBREW LETTER ALEF.

Scripts in ISO 15924 and in Unicode
| ISO 15924 | | | | Script in Unicode | | | | |
| Code | ISO number | ISO formal name | Directionality | Unicode Alias | Version | Characters | Notes | Description |
|---|---|---|---|---|---|---|---|---|
| Adlm | 166 | Adlam | right-to-left script | Adlam | 9.0 | 88 | | Ch 19.9 |
| Afak | 439 | Afaka | left-to-right | — Not in Unicode, proposal is explored | | | | |
| Aghb | 239 | Caucasian Albanian | left-to-right | Caucasian Albanian | 7.0 | 53 | Ancient/historic | Ch 8.11 |
| Ahom | 338 | Ahom, Tai Ahom | left-to-right | Ahom | 8.0 | 65 | Ancient/historic | Ch 15.16 |
| Arab | 160 | Arabic | right-to-left script | Arabic | 1.0 | 1,452 | | Ch 9.2 |
| Aran | 161 | Arabic (Nastaliq variant) | right-to-left script | — Typographic variant of Arabic (see § Arab) | | | | |
| Armi | 124 | Imperial Aramaic | right-to-left script | Imperial Aramaic | 5.2 | 31 | Ancient/historic | Ch 10.4 |
| Armn | 230 | Armenian | left-to-right | Armenian | 1.0 | 99 | | Ch 7.6 |
| Avst | 134 | Avestan | right-to-left script | Avestan | 5.2 | 61 | Ancient/historic | Ch 10.7 |
| Bali | 360 | Balinese | left-to-right | Balinese | 5.0 | 127 | | Ch 17.3 |
| Bamu | 435 | Bamum | left-to-right | Bamum | 5.2 | 657 | | Ch 19.6 |
| Bass | 259 | Bassa Vah | left-to-right | Bassa Vah | 7.0 | 36 | Ancient/historic | Ch 19.7 |
| Batk | 365 | Batak | left-to-right | Batak | 6.0 | 56 | | Ch 17.6 |
| Beng | 325 | Bengali (Bangla) | left-to-right | Bengali | 1.0 | 98 | | Ch 12.2 |
| Berf | 258 | Beria Erfe | left-to-right and top-down | Beria Erfe | 17.0 | 50 | | |
| Bhks | 334 | Bhaiksuki | left-to-right | Bhaiksuki | 9.0 | 97 | Ancient/historic | Ch 14.3 |
| Blis | 550 | Blissymbols | varies | — Not in Unicode, proposal is explored | | | | |
| Bopo | 285 | Bopomofo | left-to-right, bidirectional text, vertical writing, vertical right-to-left | Bopomofo | 1.0 | 77 | | Ch 18.3 |
| Brah | 300 | Brahmi | left-to-right | Brahmi | 6.0 | 115 | Ancient/historic | Ch 14.1 |
| Brai | 570 | Braille | left-to-right, right-to-left script | Braille | 3.0 | 256 | | Ch 21.1 |
| Bugi | 367 | Buginese | left-to-right | Buginese | 4.1 | 30 | | Ch 17.2 |
| Buhd | 372 | Buhid | left-to-right | Buhid | 3.2 | 20 | | Ch 17.1 |
| Cakm | 349 | Chakma | left-to-right | Chakma | 6.1 | 71 | | Ch 13.11 |
| Cans | 440 | Unified Canadian Aboriginal Syllabics | left-to-right | Canadian Aboriginal | 3.0 | 726 | | Ch 20.2 |
| Cari | 201 | Carian | left-to-right, right-to-left script | Carian | 5.1 | 49 | Ancient/historic | Ch 8.5 |
| Cham | 358 | Cham | left-to-right | Cham | 5.1 | 83 | | Ch 16.10 |
| Cher | 445 | Cherokee | left-to-right | Cherokee | 3.0 | 172 | | Ch 20.1 |
| Chis | 298 | Chisoi | left-to-right | — Not in Unicode, proposal is mature | | | | |
| Chrs | 109 | Chorasmian | right-to-left script, vertical writing | Chorasmian | 13.0 | 28 | Ancient/historic | Ch 10.8 |
| Cirt | 291 | Cirth | varies | — Not in Unicode | | | | |
| Copt | 204 | Coptic | left-to-right | Coptic | 1.0 | 137 | Ancient/historic, disunified from Greek in 4.1 | Ch 7.3 |
| Cpmn | 402 | Cypro-Minoan | left-to-right | Cypro Minoan | 14.0 | 99 | Ancient/historic | Ch 8.4 |
| Cprt | 403 | Cypriot syllabary | right-to-left script | Cypriot | 4.0 | 55 | Ancient/historic | Ch 8.3 |
| Cyrl | 220 | Cyrillic | left-to-right | Cyrillic | 1.0 | 508 | Includes typographic variant Old Church Slavonic (see § Cyrs) | Ch 7.4 |
| Cyrs | 221 | Cyrillic (Old Church Slavonic variant) | left-to-right | — Typographic variant of Cyrillic (see § Cyrl); Ancient/historic | | | | |
| Deva | 315 | Devanagari (Nagari) | left-to-right | Devanagari | 1.0 | 165 | | Ch 12.1 |
| Diak | 342 | Dives Akuru | left-to-right | Dives Akuru | 13.0 | 72 | Ancient/historic | Ch 15.15 |
| Dogr | 328 | Dogra | left-to-right | Dogra | 11.0 | 60 | Ancient/historic | Ch 15.18 |
| Dsrt | 250 | Deseret (Mormon) | left-to-right | Deseret | 3.1 | 80 | | Ch 20.4 |
| Dupl | 755 | Duployan shorthand, Duployan stenography | left-to-right | Duployan | 7.0 | 143 | | Ch 21.6 |
| Egyd | 070 | Egyptian demotic | mixed | — Not in Unicode | | | | |
| Egyh | 060 | Egyptian hieratic | mixed | — Not in Unicode | | | | |
| Egyp | 050 | Egyptian hieroglyphs | right-to-left script, vertical writing | Egyptian Hieroglyphs | 5.2 | 5,105 | Ancient/historic | Ch 11.4 |
| Elba | 226 | Elbasan | left-to-right | Elbasan | 7.0 | 40 | Ancient/historic | Ch 8.10 |
| Elym | 128 | Elymaic | right-to-left script | Elymaic | 12.0 | 23 | Ancient/historic | Ch 10.9 |
| Ethi | 430 | Ethiopic (Geʻez) | left-to-right | Ethiopic | 3.0 | 523 | | Ch 19.1 |
| Gara | 164 | Garay | right-to-left script | Garay | 16.0 | 69 | | |
| Geok | 241 | Khutsuri (Asomtavruli and Nuskhuri) | left-to-right | Georgian | | | Unicode groups Khutsori, Asomtavruli and Nuskhuri into 'Georgian' (see § Geok). Similarly, Mkhedruli and Mtavruli are 'Georgian' (see § Geor) | Ch 7.7 |
| Geor | 240 | Georgian (Mkhedruli and Mtavruli) | left-to-right | Georgian | 1.0 | 173 | In Unicode this also includes Nuskhuri (Geok) | Ch 7.7 |
| Glag | 225 | Glagolitic | left-to-right | Glagolitic | 4.1 | 134 | Ancient/historic | Ch 7.5 |
| Gong | 312 | Gunjala Gondi | left-to-right | Gunjala Gondi | 11.0 | 63 | | Ch 13.15 |
| Gonm | 313 | Masaram Gondi | left-to-right | Masaram Gondi | 10.0 | 75 | | Ch 13.14 |
| Goth | 206 | Gothic | left-to-right | Gothic | 3.1 | 27 | Ancient/historic | Ch 8.9 |
| Gran | 343 | Grantha | left-to-right | Grantha | 7.0 | 85 | Ancient/historic | Ch 15.14 |
| Grek | 200 | Greek | left-to-right | Greek | 1.0 | 520 | Directionality sometimes as boustrophedon | Ch 7.2 |
| Gujr | 320 | Gujarati | left-to-right | Gujarati | 1.0 | 91 | | Ch 12.4 |
| Gukh | 397 | Gurung Khema | left-to-right | Gurung Khema | 16.0 | 58 | | |
| Guru | 310 | Gurmukhi | left-to-right | Gurmukhi | 1.0 | 80 | | Ch 12.3 |
| Hanb | 503 | Han with Bopomofo (alias for Han + Bopomofo) | mixed | — See § Hani, § Bopo | | | | |
| Hang | 286 | Hangul (Hangŭl, Hangeul) | left-to-right, vertical right-to-left | Hangul | 1.0 | 11,739 | Hangul syllables relocated in 2.0 | Ch 18.6 |
| Hani | 500 | Han (Hanzi, Kanji, Hanja) | top-to-bottom, columns right-to-left (historically) | Han | 1.0 | 103,352 | | Ch 18.1 |
| Hano | 371 | Hanunoo (Hanunóo) | left-to-right, bottom-to-top | Hanunoo | 3.2 | 21 | | Ch 17.1 |
| Hans | 501 | Han (Simplified variant) | varies | — Subset of Han (Hanzi, Kanji, Hanja) (see § Hani) | | | | |
| Hant | 502 | Han (Traditional variant) | varies | — Subset of § Hani | | | | |
| Hatr | 127 | Hatran | right-to-left script | Hatran | 8.0 | 26 | Ancient/historic | Ch 10.12 |
| Hebr | 125 | Hebrew | right-to-left script | Hebrew | 1.0 | 136 | | Ch 9.1 |
| Hira | 410 | Hiragana | vertical right-to-left, left-to-right | Hiragana | 1.0 | 382 | | Ch 18.4 |
| Hluw | 080 | Anatolian Hieroglyphs (Luwian Hieroglyphs, Hittite Hieroglyphs) | left-to-right | Anatolian Hieroglyphs | 8.0 | 583 | Ancient/historic | Ch 11.6 |
| Hmng | 450 | Pahawh Hmong | left-to-right | Pahawh Hmong | 7.0 | 127 | | Ch 16.11 |
| Hmnp | 451 | Nyiakeng Puachue Hmong | left-to-right | Nyiakeng Puachue Hmong | 12.0 | 71 | | Ch 16.12 |
| Hntl | 504 | Han (Traditional variant) with Latin (alias for Hant + Latn) | | — See § Hant and § Latn | | | | |
| Hrkt | 412 | Japanese syllabaries (alias for Hiragana + Katakana) | vertical right-to-left, left-to-right | Katakana or Hiragana | | | See § Hira, § Kana | Ch 18.4 |
| Hung | 176 | Old Hungarian (Hungarian Runic) | right-to-left script | Old Hungarian | 8.0 | 108 | Ancient/historic | Ch 8.8 |
| Inds | 610 | Indus (Harappan) | right-to-left script, boustrophedon | — Not in Unicode, proposal is explored | | | | |
| Ital | 210 | Old Italic (Etruscan, Oscan, etc.) | right-to-left script, left-to-right, boustrophedon | Old Italic | 3.1 | 39 | Ancient/historic | Ch 8.6 |
| Jamo | 284 | Jamo (alias for Jamo subset of Hangul) | varies | — Subset of § Hang | | | | |
| Java | 361 | Javanese | left-to-right | Javanese | 5.2 | 90 | | Ch 17.4 |
| Jpan | 413 | Japanese (alias for Han + Hiragana + Katakana) | varies | — See § Hani, § Hira and § Kana | | | | |
| Jurc | 510 | Jurchen | vertical right-to-left, left-to-right | Jurchen | 18.0 | 965 | Ancient/historic | |
| Kali | 357 | Kayah Li | left-to-right | Kayah Li | 5.1 | 47 | | Ch 16.9 |
| Kana | 411 | Katakana | vertical right-to-left, left-to-right | Katakana | 1.0 | 327 | | Ch 18.4 |
| Kawi | 368 | Kawi | left-to-right | Kawi | 15.0 | 87 | Ancient/historic | Ch 17.9 |
| Khar | 305 | Kharoshthi | right-to-left script | Kharoshthi | 4.1 | 68 | Ancient/historic | Ch 14.2 |
| Khmr | 355 | Khmer | left-to-right | Khmer | 3.0 | 146 | | Ch 16.4 |
| Khoj | 322 | Khojki | left-to-right | Khojki | 7.0 | 65 | Ancient/historic | Ch 15.7 |
| Kitl | 505 | Khitan large script | left-to-right | — Not in Unicode | | | | |
| Kits | 288 | Khitan small script | vertical right-to-left | Khitan Small Script | 13.0 | 477 | Ancient/historic | Ch 18.12 |
| Knda | 345 | Kannada | left-to-right | Kannada | 1.0 | 92 | | Ch 12.8 |
| Kore | 287 | Korean (alias for Hangul + Han) | left-to-right | — See § Hani, § Hang | | | | |
| Kpel | 436 | Kpelle | left-to-right | — Not in Unicode, proposal is explored | | | | |
| Krai | 396 | Kirat Rai | left-to-right | Kirat Rai | 16.0 | 58 | | |
| Kthi | 317 | Kaithi | left-to-right | Kaithi | 5.2 | 68 | Ancient/historic | Ch 15.2 |
| Lana | 351 | Tai Tham (Lanna) | left-to-right | Tai Tham | 5.2 | 127 | | Ch 16.7 |
| Laoo | 356 | Lao | left-to-right | Lao | 1.0 | 83 | | Ch 16.2 |
| Latf | 217 | Latin (Fraktur variant) | left-to-right | — Typographic variant of Latin (see § Latn) | | | | |
| Latg | 216 | Latin (Gaelic variant) | left-to-right | — Typographic variant of Latin (see § Latn) | | | | |
| Latn | 215 | Latin | left-to-right | Latin | 1.0 | 1,653 | See also: Latin script in Unicode | Ch 7.1 |
| Leke | 364 | Leke | left-to-right | — Not in Unicode | | | | |
| Lepc | 335 | Lepcha (Róng) | left-to-right | Lepcha | 5.1 | 74 | | Ch 13.12 |
| Limb | 336 | Limbu | left-to-right | Limbu | 4.0 | 68 | | Ch 13.6 |
| Lina | 400 | Linear A | left-to-right | Linear A | 7.0 | 341 | Ancient/historic | Ch 8.1 |
| Linb | 401 | Linear B | left-to-right | Linear B | 4.0 | 211 | Ancient/historic | Ch 8.2 |
| Lisu | 399 | Lisu (Fraser) | left-to-right | Lisu | 5.2 | 49 | | Ch 18.9 |
| Loma | 437 | Loma | left-to-right | — Not in Unicode, proposal is explored | | | | |
| Lyci | 202 | Lycian | left-to-right | Lycian | 5.1 | 29 | Ancient/historic | Ch 8.5 |
| Lydi | 116 | Lydian | right-to-left script | Lydian | 5.1 | 27 | Ancient/historic | Ch 8.5 |
| Mahj | 314 | Mahajani | left-to-right | Mahajani | 7.0 | 39 | Ancient/historic | Ch 15.6 |
| Maka | 366 | Makasar | left-to-right | Makasar | 11.0 | 25 | Ancient/historic | Ch 17.8 |
| Mand | 140 | Mandaic, Mandaean | right-to-left script | Mandaic | 6.0 | 29 | | Ch 9.5 |
| Mani | 139 | Manichaean | right-to-left script | Manichaean | 7.0 | 51 | Ancient/historic | Ch 10.5 |
| Marc | 332 | Marchen | left-to-right | Marchen | 9.0 | 68 | Ancient/historic | Ch 14.5 |
| Maya | 090 | Mayan hieroglyphs | mixed | — Not in Unicode | | | | |
| Medf | 265 | Medefaidrin (Oberi Okaime, Oberi Ɔkaimɛ) | left-to-right | Medefaidrin | 11.0 | 91 | | Ch 19.10 |
| Mend | 438 | Mende Kikakui | right-to-left script | Mende Kikakui | 7.0 | 213 | | Ch 19.8 |
| Merc | 101 | Meroitic Cursive | right-to-left script | Meroitic Cursive | 6.1 | 90 | Ancient/historic | Ch 11.5 |
| Mero | 100 | Meroitic Hieroglyphs | right-to-left script | Meroitic Hieroglyphs | 6.1 | 32 | Ancient/historic | Ch 11.5 |
| Mlym | 347 | Malayalam | left-to-right | Malayalam | 1.0 | 118 | | Ch 12.9 |
| Modi | 324 | Modi, Moḍī | left-to-right | Modi | 7.0 | 79 | Ancient/historic | Ch 15.12 |
| Mong | 145 | Mongolian | vertical left-to-right, left-to-right | Mongolian | 3.0 | 168 | Mong includes Clear and Manchu scripts | Ch 13.5 |
| Moon | 218 | Moon (Moon code, Moon script, Moon type) | mixed | — Not in Unicode, proposal is explored | | | | |
| Mroo | 264 | Mro, Mru | left-to-right | Mro | 7.0 | 43 | | Ch 13.8 |
| Mtei | 337 | Meitei Mayek (Meithei, Meetei) | left-to-right | Meetei Mayek | 5.2 | 79 | | Ch 13.7 |
| Mult | 323 | Multani | left-to-right | Multani | 8.0 | 38 | Ancient/historic | Ch 15.10 |
| Mymr | 350 | Myanmar (Burmese) | left-to-right | Myanmar | 3.0 | 243 | | Ch 16.3 |
| Nagm | 295 | Nag Mundari | left-to-right | Nag Mundari | 15.0 | 42 | | |
| Nand | 311 | Nandinagari | left-to-right | Nandinagari | 12.0 | 65 | Ancient/historic | Ch 15.13 |
| Narb | 106 | Old North Arabian (Ancient North Arabian) | right-to-left script | Old North Arabian | 7.0 | 32 | Ancient/historic | Ch 10.1 |
| Nbat | 159 | Nabataean | right-to-left script | Nabataean | 7.0 | 40 | Ancient/historic | Ch 10.10 |
| Newa | 333 | Newa, Newar, Newari, Nepāla lipi | left-to-right | Newa | 9.0 | 97 | | Ch 13.3 |
| Nkdb | 085 | Naxi Dongba (na²¹ɕi³³ to³³ba²¹, Nakhi Tomba) | left-to-right | — Not in Unicode | | | | |
| Nkgb | 420 | Naxi Geba (na²¹ɕi³³ gʌ²¹ba²¹, 'Na-'Khi ²Ggŏ-¹baw, Nakhi Geba) | left-to-right | — Not in Unicode, proposal is explored | | | | |
| Nkoo | 165 | N’Ko | right-to-left script | NKo | 5.0 | 62 | | Ch 19.4 |
| Nshu | 499 | Nüshu | vertical right-to-left | Nushu | 10.0 | 397 | | Ch 18.8 |
| Ogam | 212 | Ogham | bottom-to-top, left-to-right | Ogham | 3.0 | 29 | Ancient/historic | Ch 8.14 |
| Olck | 261 | Ol Chiki (Ol Cemet’, Ol, Santali) | left-to-right | Ol Chiki | 5.1 | 48 | | Ch 13.10 |
| Onao | 296 | Ol Onal | left-to-right | Ol Onal | 16.0 | 44 | | |
| Orkh | 175 | Old Turkic, Orkhon Runic | right-to-left script | Old Turkic | 5.2 | 73 | Ancient/historic | Ch 14.8 |
| Orya | 327 | Oriya (Odia) | left-to-right | Oriya | 1.0 | 93 | | Ch 12.5 |
| Osge | 219 | Osage | left-to-right | Osage | 9.0 | 72 | | Ch 20.3 |
| Osma | 260 | Osmanya | left-to-right | Osmanya | 4.0 | 40 | | Ch 19.2 |
| Ougr | 143 | Old Uyghur | mixed | Old Uyghur | 14.0 | 26 | Ancient/historic | Ch 14.11 |
| Palm | 126 | Palmyrene | right-to-left script | Palmyrene | 7.0 | 32 | Ancient/historic | Ch 10.11 |
| Pauc | 263 | Pau Cin Hau | left-to-right | Pau Cin Hau | 7.0 | 57 | | Ch 16.13 |
| Pcun | 015 | Proto-Cuneiform | left-to-right | Proto Cuneiform | 18.0 | 164 | Ancient/historic | |
| Pelm | 016 | Proto-Elamite | left-to-right | — Not in Unicode | | | | |
| Perm | 227 | Old Permic | left-to-right | Old Permic | 7.0 | 43 | Ancient/historic | Ch 8.13 |
| Phag | 331 | Phags-pa | vertical left-to-right | Phags-pa | 5.0 | 56 | Ancient/historic | Ch 14.4 |
| Phli | 131 | Inscriptional Pahlavi | right-to-left script | Inscriptional Pahlavi | 5.2 | 27 | Ancient/historic | Ch 10.6 |
| Phlp | 132 | Psalter Pahlavi | right-to-left script | Psalter Pahlavi | 7.0 | 29 | Ancient/historic | Ch 10.6 |
| Phlv | 133 | Book Pahlavi | mixed | — Not in Unicode | | | | |
| Phnx | 115 | Phoenician | right-to-left script | Phoenician | 5.0 | 29 | Ancient/historic | Ch 10.3 |
| Piqd | 293 | Klingon (KLI pIqaD) | left-to-right | — Rejected for inclusion in Unicode | | | | |
| Plrd | 282 | Miao (Pollard) | left-to-right | Miao | 6.1 | 149 | | Ch 18.10 |
| Prti | 130 | Inscriptional Parthian | right-to-left script | Inscriptional Parthian | 5.2 | 30 | Ancient/historic | Ch 10.6 |
| Psin | 103 | Proto-Sinaitic | mixed | — Not in Unicode | | | | |
| Qaaa-Qabx | 900-949 | Reserved for private use (range) | | — Not in Unicode | | | | |
| Ranj | 303 | Ranjana | left-to-right | — Not in Unicode | | | | |
| Rjng | 363 | Rejang (Redjang, Kaganga) | left-to-right | Rejang | 5.1 | 37 | | Ch 17.5 |
| Rohg | 167 | Hanifi Rohingya | right-to-left script | Hanifi Rohingya | 11.0 | 50 | | Ch 16.14 |
| Roro | 620 | Rongorongo | mixed | — Not in Unicode, proposal is explored | | | | |
| Runr | 211 | Runic | left-to-right, boustrophedon, bidirectional text | Runic | 3.0 | 86 | Ancient/historic | Ch 8.7 |
| Samr | 123 | Samaritan | right-to-left script, vertical writing | Samaritan | 5.2 | 61 | | Ch 9.4 |
| Sara | 292 | Sarati | mixed | — Not in Unicode | | | | |
| Sarb | 105 | Old South Arabian | right-to-left script | Old South Arabian | 5.2 | 32 | Ancient/historic | Ch 10.2 |
| Saur | 344 | Saurashtra | left-to-right | Saurashtra | 5.1 | 82 | | Ch 13.13 |
| Seal | 590 | (Small) Seal | varies | Seal | 18.0 | 11,328 | Ancient/historic | |
| Sgnw | 095 | SignWriting | vertical left-to-right | SignWriting | 8.0 | 672 | | Ch 21.7 |
| Shaw | 281 | Shavian (Shaw) | left-to-right | Shavian | 4.0 | 48 | | Ch 8.15 |
| Shrd | 319 | Sharada, Śāradā | left-to-right | Sharada | 6.1 | 104 | | Ch 15.3 |
| Shui | 530 | Shuishu | left-to-right | — Not in Unicode | | | | |
| Sidd | 302 | Siddham, Siddhaṃ, Siddhamātṛkā | left-to-right | Siddham | 7.0 | 92 | Ancient/historic | Ch 15.5 |
| Sidt | 180 | Sidetic | right-to-left script | Sidetic | 17.0 | 26 | Ancient/historic | |
| Sind | 318 | Khudawadi, Sindhi | left-to-right | Khudawadi | 7.0 | 69 | | Ch 15.9 |
| Sinh | 348 | Sinhala | left-to-right | Sinhala | 3.0 | 111 | | Ch 13.2 |
| Sogd | 141 | Sogdian | horizontal and vertical writing in East Asian scripts, vertical writing | Sogdian | 11.0 | 42 | Ancient/historic | Ch 14.10 |
| Sogo | 142 | Old Sogdian | right-to-left script | Old Sogdian | 11.0 | 40 | Ancient/historic | Ch 14.9 |
| Sora | 398 | Sora Sompeng | left-to-right | Sora Sompeng | 6.1 | 35 | | Ch 15.17 |
| Soyo | 329 | Soyombo | left-to-right | Soyombo | 10.0 | 83 | Ancient/historic | Ch 14.7 |
| Sund | 362 | Sundanese | left-to-right | Sundanese | 5.1 | 72 | | Ch 17.7 |
| Sunu | 274 | Sunuwar | left-to-right | Sunuwar | 16.0 | 44 | | |
| Sylo | 316 | Syloti Nagri | left-to-right | Syloti Nagri | 4.1 | 45 | Ancient/historic | Ch 15.1 |
| Syrc | 135 | Syriac | right-to-left script | Syriac | 3.0 | 88 | Includes typographic variants Estrangelo (see § Syre), Western (§ Syrj), and Eastern (§ Syrn) | Ch 9.3 |
| Syre | 138 | Syriac (Estrangelo variant) | right-to-left script | — Typographic variant of Syriac (see § Syrc) | | | | |
| Syrj | 137 | Syriac (Western variant) | right-to-left script | — Typographic variant of Syriac (see § Syrc) | | | | |
| Syrn | 136 | Syriac (Eastern variant) | right-to-left script | — Typographic variant of Syriac (see § Syrc) | | | | |
| Tagb | 373 | Tagbanwa | left-to-right | Tagbanwa | 3.2 | 18 | | Ch 17.1 |
| Takr | 321 | Takri, Ṭākrī, Ṭāṅkrī | left-to-right | Takri | 6.1 | 68 | | Ch 15.4 |
| Tale | 353 | Tai Le | left-to-right | Tai Le | 4.0 | 35 | | Ch 16.5 |
| Talu | 354 | New Tai Lue | left-to-right | New Tai Lue | 4.1 | 83 | | Ch 16.6 |
| Taml | 346 | Tamil | left-to-right | Tamil | 1.0 | 123 | | Ch 12.6 |
| Tang | 520 | Tangut | vertical right-to-left, left-to-right | Tangut | 9.0 | 7,061 | Ancient/historic | Ch 18.11 |
| Tavt | 359 | Tai Viet | left-to-right | Tai Viet | 5.2 | 72 | | Ch 16.8 |
| Tayo | 380 | Tai Yo | vertical right-to-left | Tai Yo | 17.0 | 55 | | |
| Telu | 340 | Telugu | left-to-right | Telugu | 1.0 | 101 | | Ch 12.7 |
| Teng | 290 | Tengwar | left-to-right | — Not in Unicode | | | | |
| Tfng | 120 | Tifinagh (Berber) | right-to-left script, left-to-right, vertical writing, bottom-to-top | Tifinagh | 4.1 | 59 | | Ch 19.3 |
| Tglg | 370 | Tagalog (Baybayin, Alibata) | left-to-right | Tagalog | 3.2 | 23 | | Ch 17.1 |
| Thaa | 170 | Thaana | right-to-left script | Thaana | 3.0 | 50 | | Ch 13.1 |
| Thai | 352 | Thai | left-to-right | Thai | 1.0 | 86 | | Ch 16.1 |
| Tibt | 330 | Tibetan | left-to-right | Tibetan | 2.0 | 207 | Added in 1.0, removed in 1.1 and reintroduced in 2.0 | Ch 13.4 |
| Tirh | 326 | Tirhuta | left-to-right | Tirhuta | 7.0 | 82 | | Ch 15.11 |
| Tnsa | 275 | Tangsa | left-to-right | Tangsa | 14.0 | 89 | | Ch 13.18 |
| Todr | 229 | Todhri | left-to-right | Todhri | 16.0 | 52 | Ancient/historic | |
| Tols | 299 | Tolong Siki | left-to-right | Tolong Siki | 17.0 | 54 | | |
| Toto | 294 | Toto | left-to-right | Toto | 14.0 | 31 | | Ch 13.17 |
| Tutg | 341 | Tulu-Tigalari | left-to-right | Tulu Tigalari | 16.0 | 80 | Ancient/historic | |
| Ugar | 040 | Ugaritic | left-to-right | Ugaritic | 4.0 | 31 | Ancient/historic | Ch 11.2 |
| Vaii | 470 | Vai | left-to-right | Vai | 5.1 | 300 | | Ch 19.5 |
| Visp | 280 | Visible Speech | left-to-right | — Not in Unicode | | | | |
| Vith | 228 | Vithkuqi | left-to-right | Vithkuqi | 14.0 | 70 | Ancient/historic | Ch 8.12 |
| Wara | 262 | Warang Citi (Varang Kshiti) | left-to-right | Warang Citi | 7.0 | 84 | | Ch 13.9 |
| Wcho | 283 | Wancho | left-to-right | Wancho | 12.0 | 59 | | Ch 13.16 |
| Wole | 480 | Woleai | left-to-right | — Not in Unicode, proposal is explored | | | | |
| Xpeo | 030 | Old Persian | left-to-right | Old Persian | 4.1 | 50 | Ancient/historic | Ch 11.3 |
| Xsux | 020 | Cuneiform, Sumero-Akkadian | left-to-right | Cuneiform | 5.0 | 1,393 | Ancient/historic | Ch 11.1 |
| Yezi | 192 | Yezidi | right-to-left script | Yezidi | 13.0 | 47 | Ancient/historic | Ch 9.6 |
| Yiii | 460 | Yi | left-to-right | Yi | 3.0 | 1,220 | | Ch 18.7 |
| Zanb | 339 | Zanabazar Square (Zanabazarin Dörböljin Useg, Xewtee Dörböljin Bicig, Horizontal Square Script) | left-to-right | Zanabazar Square | 10.0 | 72 | Ancient/historic | Ch 14.6 |
| Zinh | 994 | Code for inherited script | | Inherited | | 695 | | |
| Zmth | 995 | Mathematical notation | | — Not a 'script' in Unicode | | | | |
| Zsye | 993 | Symbols (emoji variant) | | — Not a 'script' in Unicode | | | | |
| Zsym | 996 | Symbols | | — Not a 'script' in Unicode | | | | |
| Zxxx | 997 | Code for unwritten documents | | — Not a 'script' in Unicode | | | | |
| Zyyy | 998 | Code for undetermined script | | Common | | 9,276 | | |
| Zzzz | 999 | Code for uncoded script | | Unknown | | 941,239 | In Unicode: All other code points | |
Notes: 1. ISO 15924 publications As of 24 April 2025; 2. ISO 15924 Normative text file As of 24 April 2025; 3. ISO 15924 Changes (including Aliases for Unicode; as of 24 April 2025); 4. Unicode version 18.0; 5. "Unicode 18.0 Character Code Charts".; 6. Unicode uses the "Property Value Alias" (Alias) as the script-name. These Alias names are part of Unicode and are published informatively next to ISO 15924. An alias script name may be used in a character name: Palm, Palmyrene → U+10860 𐡠 PALMYRENE LETTER ALEPH.; 7. In Unicode, the Phoenician script is intended for the representation of text in Paleo-Hebrew, Archaic Phoenician, Phoenician, Early Aramaic, Late Phoenician cursive, Phoenician papyri, Siloam Hebrew, Hebrew seals, Ammonite, Moabite, and Punic.

== Normalization properties ==
Decompositions, decomposition type, canonical combining class, composition exclusions, and more.

== Age ==
Age is the version of the standard in which the code point was first designated. The version number is shortened to the numbering major.minor', although there more detailed version numbers are used: versions 4.0.0 and 4.0.1 both are named 4.0 as Age. Given the releases, Age can be from the range: 1.1, 2.0, 2.1, 3.0, 3.1, 3.2, 4.0, 4.1, 5.0, 5.1, 5.2, 6.0, 6.1, 6.2, 6.3, 7.0, 8.0, 9.0, 10.0, 11.0, 12.0, 12.1, 13.0, 14.0, 15.0, 15.1, 16.0, 17.0, and 18.0. The long values for Age begin in a V and use an underscore instead of a dot: V1_1, for example. Codepoints without a specifically assigned age value have the value "NA", with the long form "Unassigned".

== Deprecated ==
Once a character has been defined, it will not be removed or reassigned. However, a character may be deprecated, meaning its "use is strongly discouraged". As of Unicode version 18.0, the following fifteen characters are deprecated:

Deprecated characters in Unicode
| Codepoint | Character name | Recommended alternative | | Remarks |
|---|---|---|---|---|
| U+0149 | LATIN SMALL LETTER N PRECEDED BY APOSTROPHE | U+02BC U+006E | ʼn | |
| U+0673 | ARABIC LETTER ALEF WITH WAVY HAMZA BELOW | U+0627 U+065F | اٟ | |
| U+0F77 | TIBETAN VOWEL SIGN VOCALIC RR | U+0FB2 U+0F81 (Note: U+0F81 ཱྀ TIBETAN VOWEL SIGN REVERSED II is itself discouraged (but not deprecated), and is canonically equivalent to the sequence U+0F71 U+0F80.) | ྲཱྀ | |
| U+0F79 | TIBETAN VOWEL SIGN VOCALIC LL | U+0FB3 U+0F81 | ླཱྀ | |
| U+17A3 | KHMER INDEPENDENT VOWEL QAQ | U+17A2 | អ | |
| U+17A4 | KHMER INDEPENDENT VOWEL QAA | U+17A2 U+17B6 | អា | |
| U+206A | INHIBIT SYMMETRIC SWAPPING | None (Note: Rather than using this control character to indicate the appropriate appearance for text, appropriate character codes with the correct state should be used.) | | |
| U+206B | ACTIVATE SYMMETRIC SWAPPING | None | | |
| U+206C | INHIBIT ARABIC FORM SHAPING | None | | |
| U+206D | ACTIVATE ARABIC FORM SHAPING | None | | |
| U+206E | NATIONAL DIGIT SHAPES | None | | |
| U+206F | NOMINAL DIGIT SHAPES | None | | |
| U+2329 | LEFT-POINTING ANGLE BRACKET | U+3008 (Note: This alternative character is in the CJK Symbols and Punctuation block, and is not suitable for mathematical or technical use) | 〈 | U+27E8 ⟨ MATHEMATICAL LEFT ANGLE BRACKET is recommended for mathematical and other technical use |
| U+232A | RIGHT-POINTING ANGLE BRACKET | U+3009 | 〉 | U+27E9 ⟩ MATHEMATICAL RIGHT ANGLE BRACKET is recommended for mathematical and other technical use |
| U+E0001 | LANGUAGE TAG | None (Note: Alternative means of language tagging should be used instead.) | | |

== Boundaries ==
The Unicode Standard specifies the following boundary-related properties:

- Grapheme cluster
- Word
- Line
- Sentence

== Alias name ==
Unicode can assign alias names to code points. These names are unique over all names (including regular ones), so they can be used as identifier. There are five possible reasons to add an alias:

1. Abbreviation
Commonly occurring abbreviations or acronyms for control codes, format characters, spaces, and variation selectors.
For example, U+00A0 NO-BREAK SPACE has alias NBSP. Sometimes presented in a box: NBSP.
2. Control
ISO 6429 names for C0 and C1 control functions and similar commonly occurring names, are added as an alias to the character.
For example, U+0008 <control-0008> has the alias BACKSPACE.
3. Correction
This is a correction for a "serious problem" in the primary character name, usually an error.
For example, U+2118 ℘ SCRIPT CAPITAL P is actually a lowercase p, and so is given alias name WEIERSTRASS ELLIPTIC FUNCTION: "actually this has the form of a lowercase calligraphic p, despite its name, and through the alias the correct spelling is added." In descriptions, with preceding symbol ※.
4. Alternate
A widely used alternate name for a character.
Example: U+FEFF ZERO WIDTH NO-BREAK SPACE has the alternate alias BYTE ORDER MARK.
5. Figment
Several documented labels for C1 control code points which were never actually approved in any standard (figment meaning "feigned, in fiction").
For example, U+0099 <control-0099> has the figment alias SINGLE GRAPHIC CHARACTER INTRODUCER. This name is an architectural concept from early drafts of ISO/IEC 10646-1, but it was never approved or standardized.
