= Trojan Source =

Software vulnerability in source code

- CVE identifiers: CVE-2021-42574; CVE-2021-42694
- Date discovered: September 9, 2021; 4 years ago
- Discoverer: Nicholas Boucher, Ross Anderson
- Affected software: Unicode, source code
- Website: trojansource.codes

Trojan Source is a software vulnerability that abuses Unicode's bidirectional characters to display source code differently than the actual execution of the source code. The exploit utilizes how writing scripts of different reading directions are displayed and encoded on computers. It was discovered by Nicholas Boucher and Ross Anderson at Cambridge University in late 2021.

== Background ==
Unicode is an encoding standard for representing text, symbols, and glyphs. Unicode is the most dominant encoding on computers, used in over 98% of websites as of September 2023. It supports many languages, and because of this, it must support different methods of writing text. This requires support for both left-to-right languages, such as English and Russian, and right-to-left languages, such as Hebrew and Arabic. Since Unicode aims to enable using more than one writing system, it must be able to mix scripts with different display orders and resolve conflicting orders. As a solution, Unicode contains characters called bidirectional characters (Bidi) that describe how text is displayed and represented. These characters can be abused to change how text is interpreted without changing it visually, as the characters are often invisible.

Relevant Unicode bidirectional formatting characters
Abbreviation	Name	Description
LRE	U+202A LEFT-TO-RIGHT EMBEDDING	Try treating following text as left-to-right.
RLE	U+202B RIGHT-TO-LEFT EMBEDDING	Try treating following text as right-to-left.
LRO	U+202D LEFT-TO-RIGHT OVERRIDE	Force treating following text as left-to-right.
RLO	U+202E RIGHT-TO-LEFT OVERRIDE	Force treating following text as right-to-left.
LRI	U+2066 LEFT-TO-RIGHT ISOLATE	Force treating following text as left-to-right without affecting adjacent text.
RLI	U+2067 RIGHT-TO-LEFT ISOLATE	Force treating following text as right-to-left without affecting adjacent text.
FSI	U+2068 FIRST STRONG ISOLATE	Force treating following text in direction indicated by the next character.
PDF	U+202C POP DIRECTIONAL FORMATTING	Terminate nearest LRE, RLE, LRO, or RLO.
PDI	U+2069 POP DIRECTIONAL ISOLATE	Terminate nearest LRI or RLI.

== Methodology ==
In the exploit, bidirectional characters are abused to visually reorder text in source code so that later execution occurs in a different order. Bidirectional characters can be inserted in areas of source code where string literals are allowed. This often applies to documentation, variables, or comments.

Vulnerable Python code
Source code with hints

def sum(num1, num2):
  '''Add num1 and num2, and [RLI] ''' ;return
  return num1 + num2

Source code displayed visually

def sum(num1, num2):
  '''Add num1 and num2, and return; '''
  return num1 + num2

Source code interpreted

def sum(num1, num2):
  '''Add num1 and num2, and ''' ;
  return
  return num1 + num2

In the above example, the RLI mark (right-to-left isolate) forces the following text to be interpreted differently than it is displayed: the triple-quote is first (ending the string), followed by a semicolon (starting a new line), and finally with the premature return (returning None and ignoring any code below it). The new line terminates the RLI mark, preventing it from flowing into the below code. Because of the Bidi character, some source code editors and IDEs rearrange the code for display without any visual indication that the code has been rearranged, so a human code reviewer would not normally detect them. However, when the code is inserted into a compiler, the compiler may ignore the Bidi character and process the characters in a different order than visually displayed. When the compiler is finished, it could potentially execute code that visually appeared to be non-executable. Formatting marks can be combined multiple times to create complex attacks.

== Impact and mitigation ==
Programming languages that support Unicode strings and follow Unicode's Bidi algorithm are vulnerable to the exploit. This includes languages such as Java, Go, C, C++, C#, Python, and JavaScript.

While the attack is not strictly an error, many compilers, interpreters, and websites added warnings or mitigations for the exploit. Both GNU GCC and LLVM received requests to deal with the exploit. Marek Polacek submitted a patch to GCC shortly after the exploit was published that implemented a warning for potentially unsafe directional characters; this functionality was merged for GCC 12 under the -Wbidi-chars flag. LLVM also merged similar patches. Rust fixed the exploit in 1.56.1, rejecting code that includes the characters by default. The developers of Rust found no vulnerable packages prior to the fix.

Many source code editors and IDEs now make these potentially unsafe characters more visible. Visual Studio Code now renders control characters by default. Notepad++ and vim already made these characters more visible, as noted in the research paper.

Red Hat issued an advisory on their website, labeling the exploit as "moderate". GitHub released a warning on their blog, as well as updating the website to show a dialog box when Bidi characters are detected in a repository's code.
