= Makasar (Unicode block) =

- Range: U+11EE0..U+11EFF (32 code points)
- Plane: SMP
- Scripts: Makasar
- Assigned: 25 code points
- Unused: 7 reserved code points

Unicode version history
- 11.0 (2018): 25 (+25)

Unicode documentation
- Code chart ∣ Web page

Makasar is a Unicode block containing characters for Makasar script (also known as "Old Makassarese" or "Makassarese bird script" in English-language scholarly works). The script was used historically in South Sulawesi, Indonesia for writing the Makassarese language.

== Block ==
Makasar^{[1]}^{[2]} Official Unicode Consortium code chart (PDF)
	0	1	2	3	4	5	6	7	8	9	A	B	C	D	E	F
U+11EEx	𑻠	𑻡	𑻢	𑻣	𑻤	𑻥	𑻦	𑻧	𑻨	𑻩	𑻪	𑻫	𑻬	𑻭	𑻮	𑻯
U+11EFx	𑻰	𑻱	𑻲	𑻳	𑻴	𑻵	𑻶	𑻷	𑻸							
Notes: 1. As of Unicode version 16.0; 2. Grey areas indicate non-assigned code points

== History ==
The following Unicode-related documents record the purpose and process of defining specific characters in the Makasar block:

Version	Final code points (Note: Proposed code points and characters names may differ from final code points and names)	Count	L2 ID	Document
11.0	U+11EE0..11EF8	25	L2/15-100	Pandey, Anshuman (2015-06-24), Preliminary Proposal to Encode the Makassarese Bird Script
11.0	U+11EE0..11EF8	25	L2/15-179	Pandey, Anshuman (2015-07-18), Proposal to Encode the Old Makassarese Script
11.0	U+11EE0..11EF8	25	L2/15-312	Anderson, Deborah; Whistler, Ken; McGowan, Rick; Pournader, Roozbeh; Glass, Andrew; Iancu, Laurențiu (2015-11-01), "4. Makasar Script", Recommendations to UTC #145 November 2015 on Script Proposals
11.0	U+11EE0..11EF8	25	L2/15-233	Pandey, Anshuman (2015-11-02), Proposal to encode the Makasar script
11.0	U+11EE0..11EF8	25	L2/15-254	Moore, Lisa (2015-11-16), "D.4", UTC #145 Minutes
