= Ethiopic Extended-B =

- Range: U+1E7E0..U+1E7FF (32 code points)
- Plane: SMP
- Scripts: Ethiopic
- Assigned: 28 code points
- Unused: 4 reserved code points

Unicode version history
- 14.0 (2021): 28 (+28)

Unicode documentation
- Code chart ∣ Web page

Ethiopic Extended-B is a Unicode block containing additional Geʽez characters for the Gurage languages of Ethiopia.

== Block ==
Ethiopic Extended-B^{[1]}^{[2]} Official Unicode Consortium code chart (PDF)
	0	1	2	3	4	5	6	7	8	9	A	B	C	D	E	F
U+1E7Ex	𞟠	𞟡	𞟢	𞟣	𞟤	𞟥	𞟦		𞟨	𞟩	𞟪	𞟫		𞟭	𞟮	
U+1E7Fx	𞟰	𞟱	𞟲	𞟳	𞟴	𞟵	𞟶	𞟷	𞟸	𞟹	𞟺	𞟻	𞟼	𞟽	𞟾	
Notes: 1. As of Unicode version 16.0; 2. Grey areas indicate non-assigned code points

== History ==
The following Unicode-related documents record the purpose and process of defining specific characters in the Ethiopic Extended-B block:

Version	Final code points (Note: Proposed code points and characters names may differ from final code points and names)	Count	L2 ID	Document
14.0	U+1E7E0..1E7E6, 1E7E8..1E7EB, 1E7ED..1E7EE, 1E7F0..1E7FE	28	L2/21-037	Menuta, Fekede; Gobena, Feidu Akmel; Yacob, Daniel (2021-01-11), Modern Gurage Orthography Additions to Ethiopic Script
14.0	U+1E7E0..1E7E6, 1E7E8..1E7EB, 1E7ED..1E7EE, 1E7F0..1E7FE	28	L2/21-016R	Anderson, Deborah; Whistler, Ken; Pournader, Roozbeh; Moore, Lisa; Liang, Hai (2021-01-14), "9 Ethiopic", Recommendations to UTC #166 January 2021 on Script Proposals
14.0	U+1E7E0..1E7E6, 1E7E8..1E7EB, 1E7ED..1E7EE, 1E7F0..1E7FE	28	L2/21-009	Moore, Lisa (2021-01-27), "B.1 — 9 Ethiopic", UTC #166 Minutes
