= Sutton SignWriting (Unicode block) =

- Range: U+1D800..U+1DAAF (688 code points)
- Plane: SMP
- Scripts: SignWriting
- Assigned: 672 code points
- Unused: 16 reserved code points

Unicode version history
- 8.0 (2015): 672 (+672)

Unicode documentation
- Code chart ∣ Web page

Sutton SignWriting is a Unicode block containing characters used in SignWriting, a system for writing sign languages that was developed by Valerie Sutton in 1974.

== Block ==
Sutton SignWriting^{[a]}^{[b]}^{[c]} Official Unicode Consortium code chart (PDF)
| | 0 | 1 | 2 | 3 | 4 | 5 | 6 | 7 | 8 | 9 | A | B | C | D | E | F |
|---|---|---|---|---|---|---|---|---|---|---|---|---|---|---|---|---|
| U+1D80x | 𝠀 | 𝠁 | 𝠂 | 𝠃 | 𝠄 | 𝠅 | 𝠆 | 𝠇 | 𝠈 | 𝠉 | 𝠊 | 𝠋 | 𝠌 | 𝠍 | 𝠎 | 𝠏 |
| U+1D81x | 𝠐 | 𝠑 | 𝠒 | 𝠓 | 𝠔 | 𝠕 | 𝠖 | 𝠗 | 𝠘 | 𝠙 | 𝠚 | 𝠛 | 𝠜 | 𝠝 | 𝠞 | 𝠟 |
| U+1D82x | 𝠠 | 𝠡 | 𝠢 | 𝠣 | 𝠤 | 𝠥 | 𝠦 | 𝠧 | 𝠨 | 𝠩 | 𝠪 | 𝠫 | 𝠬 | 𝠭 | 𝠮 | 𝠯 |
| U+1D83x | 𝠰 | 𝠱 | 𝠲 | 𝠳 | 𝠴 | 𝠵 | 𝠶 | 𝠷 | 𝠸 | 𝠹 | 𝠺 | 𝠻 | 𝠼 | 𝠽 | 𝠾 | 𝠿 |
| U+1D84x | 𝡀 | 𝡁 | 𝡂 | 𝡃 | 𝡄 | 𝡅 | 𝡆 | 𝡇 | 𝡈 | 𝡉 | 𝡊 | 𝡋 | 𝡌 | 𝡍𝪛 | 𝡎 | 𝡏𝪛 |
| U+1D85x | 𝡐 | 𝡑𝪛 | 𝡒 | 𝡓 | 𝡔 | 𝡕 | 𝡖 | 𝡗 | 𝡘 | 𝡙 | 𝡚 | 𝡛 | 𝡜𝪛 | 𝡝 | 𝡞𝪛 | 𝡟 |
| U+1D86x | 𝡠 | 𝡡 | 𝡢 | 𝡣 | 𝡤 | 𝡥 | 𝡦 | 𝡧 | 𝡨 | 𝡩 | 𝡪 | 𝡫 | 𝡬 | 𝡭 | 𝡮 | 𝡯 |
| U+1D87x | 𝡰 | 𝡱 | 𝡲 | 𝡳 | 𝡴 | 𝡵 | 𝡶 | 𝡷 | 𝡸 | 𝡹 | 𝡺 | 𝡻 | 𝡼 | 𝡽 | 𝡾 | 𝡿 |
| U+1D88x | 𝢀 | 𝢁 | 𝢂 | 𝢃 | 𝢄 | 𝢅 | 𝢆 | 𝢇 | 𝢈 | 𝢉 | 𝢊 | 𝢋 | 𝢌 | 𝢍 | 𝢎 | 𝢏 |
| U+1D89x | 𝢐 | 𝢑 | 𝢒 | 𝢓 | 𝢔 | 𝢕 | 𝢖 | 𝢗 | 𝢘 | 𝢙 | 𝢚 | 𝢛 | 𝢜 | 𝢝 | 𝢞 | 𝢟 |
| U+1D8Ax | 𝢠 | 𝢡 | 𝢢 | 𝢣 | 𝢤 | 𝢥 | 𝢦 | 𝢧 | 𝢨 | 𝢩 | 𝢪 | 𝢫 | 𝢬 | 𝢭 | 𝢮 | 𝢯 |
| U+1D8Bx | 𝢰 | 𝢱 | 𝢲 | 𝢳 | 𝢴 | 𝢵 | 𝢶 | 𝢷 | 𝢸 | 𝢹 | 𝢺 | 𝢻 | 𝢼 | 𝢽 | 𝢾 | 𝢿 |
| U+1D8Cx | 𝣀 | 𝣁 | 𝣂 | 𝣃 | 𝣄 | 𝣅 | 𝣆 | 𝣇 | 𝣈 | 𝣉 | 𝣊 | 𝣋 | 𝣌 | 𝣍 | 𝣎 | 𝣏 |
| U+1D8Dx | 𝣐 | 𝣑 | 𝣒 | 𝣓 | 𝣔 | 𝣕 | 𝣖 | 𝣗 | 𝣘 | 𝣙 | 𝣚 | 𝣛 | 𝣜 | 𝣝 | 𝣞 | 𝣟 |
| U+1D8Ex | 𝣠 | 𝣡 | 𝣢 | 𝣣 | 𝣤 | 𝣥 | 𝣦 | 𝣧 | 𝣨 | 𝣩 | 𝣪 | 𝣫 | 𝣬 | 𝣭 | 𝣮 | 𝣯 |
| U+1D8Fx | 𝣰 | 𝣱 | 𝣲 | 𝣳 | 𝣴 | 𝣵 | 𝣶𝪛 | 𝣷 | 𝣸 | 𝣹 | 𝣺 | 𝣻 | 𝣼 | 𝣽 | 𝣾 | 𝣿 |
| U+1D90x | 𝤀 | 𝤁 | 𝤂 | 𝤃 | 𝤄𝪛 | 𝤅 | 𝤆 | 𝤇 | 𝤈 | 𝤉 | 𝤊 | 𝤋 | 𝤌 | 𝤍 | 𝤎 | 𝤏 |
| U+1D91x | 𝤐 | 𝤑 | 𝤒 | 𝤓 | 𝤔 | 𝤕 | 𝤖 | 𝤗 | 𝤘 | 𝤙 | 𝤚 | 𝤛 | 𝤜 | 𝤝 | 𝤞 | 𝤟 |
| U+1D92x | 𝤠 | 𝤡 | 𝤢 | 𝤣 | 𝤤 | 𝤥 | 𝤦 | 𝤧 | 𝤨 | 𝤩 | 𝤪 | 𝤫 | 𝤬 | 𝤭 | 𝤮 | 𝤯 |
| U+1D93x | 𝤰 | 𝤱 | 𝤲 | 𝤳 | 𝤴 | 𝤵 | 𝤶 | 𝤷 | 𝤸 | 𝤹 | 𝤺 | 𝤻 | 𝤼 | 𝤽 | 𝤾 | 𝤿 |
| U+1D94x | 𝥀 | 𝥁 | 𝥂 | 𝥃 | 𝥄 | 𝥅 | 𝥆 | 𝥇 | 𝥈 | 𝥉 | 𝥊 | 𝥋 | 𝥌 | 𝥍 | 𝥎 | 𝥏 |
| U+1D95x | 𝥐 | 𝥑 | 𝥒 | 𝥓 | 𝥔 | 𝥕 | 𝥖 | 𝥗 | 𝥘 | 𝥙 | 𝥚 | 𝥛 | 𝥜 | 𝥝 | 𝥞 | 𝥟 |
| U+1D96x | 𝥠 | 𝥡 | 𝥢 | 𝥣 | 𝥤 | 𝥥 | 𝥦 | 𝥧 | 𝥨 | 𝥩 | 𝥪 | 𝥫 | 𝥬 | 𝥭 | 𝥮 | 𝥯 |
| U+1D97x | 𝥰 | 𝥱 | 𝥲 | 𝥳 | 𝥴 | 𝥵 | 𝥶 | 𝥷 | 𝥸 | 𝥹 | 𝥺 | 𝥻 | 𝥼 | 𝥽 | 𝥾 | 𝥿 |
| U+1D98x | 𝦀 | 𝦁 | 𝦂 | 𝦃 | 𝦄 | 𝦅 | 𝦆 | 𝦇 | 𝦈 | 𝦉 | 𝦊 | 𝦋 | 𝦌 | 𝦍 | 𝦎 | 𝦏 |
| U+1D99x | 𝦐 | 𝦑 | 𝦒 | 𝦓 | 𝦔 | 𝦕 | 𝦖 | 𝦗 | 𝦘 | 𝦙 | 𝦚 | 𝦛 | 𝦜 | 𝦝 | 𝦞 | 𝦟 |
| U+1D9Ax | 𝦠 | 𝦡 | 𝦢 | 𝦣 | 𝦤 | 𝦥 | 𝦦 | 𝦧 | 𝦨 | 𝦩 | 𝦪 | 𝦫 | 𝦬 | 𝦭 | 𝦮 | 𝦯 |
| U+1D9Bx | 𝦰 | 𝦱 | 𝦲 | 𝦳 | 𝦴 | 𝦵 | 𝦶 | 𝦷 | 𝦸 | 𝦹 | 𝦺 | 𝦻 | 𝦼 | 𝦽 | 𝦾 | 𝦿 |
| U+1D9Cx | 𝧀 | 𝧁 | 𝧂 | 𝧃 | 𝧄 | 𝧅 | 𝧆 | 𝧇 | 𝧈 | 𝧉 | 𝧊 | 𝧋 | 𝧌 | 𝧍 | 𝧎 | 𝧏 |
| U+1D9Dx | 𝧐 | 𝧑 | 𝧒 | 𝧓 | 𝧔 | 𝧕 | 𝧖 | 𝧗 | 𝧘 | 𝧙 | 𝧚 | 𝧛 | 𝧜 | 𝧝 | 𝧞 | 𝧟 |
| U+1D9Ex | 𝧠 | 𝧡 | 𝧢 | 𝧣 | 𝧤 | 𝧥 | 𝧦 | 𝧧 | 𝧨 | 𝧩 | 𝧪 | 𝧫 | 𝧬 | 𝧭 | 𝧮 | 𝧯 |
| U+1D9Fx | 𝧰 | 𝧱 | 𝧲 | 𝧳 | 𝧴 | 𝧵 | 𝧶 | 𝧷 | 𝧸 | 𝧹 | 𝧺 | 𝧻 | 𝧼 | 𝧽 | 𝧾 | 𝧿 |
| U+1DA0x | 𝨀 | 𝨁 | 𝨂 | 𝨃 | 𝨄 | 𝨅 | 𝨆 | 𝨇 | 𝨈 | 𝨉 | 𝨊 | 𝨋 | 𝨌 | 𝨍 | 𝨎 | 𝨏 |
| U+1DA1x | 𝨐 | 𝨑 | 𝨒 | 𝨓 | 𝨔 | 𝨕 | 𝨖 | 𝨗 | 𝨘 | 𝨙 | 𝨚 | 𝨛 | 𝨜 | 𝨝 | 𝨞 | 𝨟 |
| U+1DA2x | 𝨠 | 𝨡 | 𝨢 | 𝨣 | 𝨤 | 𝨥 | 𝨦 | 𝨧 | 𝨨 | 𝨩 | 𝨪 | 𝨫 | 𝨬 | 𝨭 | 𝨮 | 𝨯 |
| U+1DA3x | 𝨰 | 𝨱 | 𝨲 | 𝨳 | 𝨴 | 𝨵 | 𝨶 | 𝨷 | 𝨸 | 𝨹 | 𝨺 | 𝨻 | 𝨼 | 𝨽 | 𝨾 | 𝨿 |
| U+1DA4x | 𝩀 | 𝩁 | 𝩂 | 𝩃 | 𝩄 | 𝩅 | 𝩆 | 𝩇 | 𝩈 | 𝩉 | 𝩊 | 𝩋 | 𝩌 | 𝩍 | 𝩎 | 𝩏 |
| U+1DA5x | 𝩐 | 𝩑 | 𝩒 | 𝩓 | 𝩔 | 𝩕 | 𝩖 | 𝩗 | 𝩘 | 𝩙 | 𝩚 | 𝩛 | 𝩜 | 𝩝 | 𝩞 | 𝩟 |
| U+1DA6x | 𝩠 | 𝩡 | 𝩢 | 𝩣 | 𝩤 | 𝩥 | 𝩦 | 𝩧 | 𝩨 | 𝩩 | 𝩪 | 𝩫 | 𝩬 | 𝩭 | 𝩮 | 𝩯 |
| U+1DA7x | 𝩰 | 𝩱 | 𝩲 | 𝩳 | 𝩴 | 𝩵 | 𝩶 | 𝩷 | 𝩸 | 𝩹 | 𝩺 | 𝩻 | 𝩼 | 𝩽 | 𝩾 | 𝩿 |
| U+1DA8x | 𝪀 | 𝪁 | 𝪂 | 𝪃 | 𝪄 | 𝪅 | 𝪆 | 𝪇 | 𝪈 | 𝪉 | 𝪊 | 𝪋 | | | | |
| U+1DA9x | | | | | | | | | | | | SW; F2 | SW; F3 | SW; F4 | SW; F5 | SW; F6 |
| U+1DAAx | | SW; R2 | SW; R3 | SW; R4 | SW; R5 | SW; R6 | SW; R7 | SW; R8 | SW; R9 | SW; R10 | SW; R11 | SW; R12 | SW; R13 | SW; R14 | SW; R15 | SW; R16 |
Notes a. As of Unicode version 17.0 b. Grey areas indicate non-assigned code points c. U+1D84D, U+1D84F, U+1D851, U+1D85C, U+1D85E, U+1D8F6, U+1D904 shown with modifier U+1DA9B SW-F2

== History ==
The following Unicode-related documents record the purpose and process of defining specific characters in the Sutton SignWriting block:

| Version | Final code points (Note: Proposed code points and characters names may differ from final code points and names) | Count | L2 ID | WG2 ID | Document |
|---|---|---|---|---|---|
| 8.0 | U+1D800–1DA8B, 1DA9B–1DA9F, 1DAA1–1DAAF | 672 | L2/11-101 | N4015 | Everson, Michael (2011-04-06), Preliminary proposal for encoding the SignWriting script in the SMP of the UCS |
| 8.0 | U+1D800–1DA8B, 1DA9B–1DA9F, 1DAA1–1DAAF | 672 | L2/11-174 | | Bickford, J. Albert (2011-05-07), Letter in support of SignWriting |
| 8.0 | U+1D800–1DA8B, 1DA9B–1DA9F, 1DAA1–1DAAF | 672 | L2/11-217 | N4090 | Everson, Michael; Slevinski, Stephen; Sutton, Valerie (2011-05-30), Revised proposal for encoding the SignWriting script in the SMP of the UCS |
| 8.0 | U+1D800–1DA8B, 1DA9B–1DA9F, 1DAA1–1DAAF | 672 | | N4103 | "11.17 SignWriting script", Unconfirmed minutes of WG 2 meeting 58, 2012-01-03 |
| 8.0 | U+1D800–1DA8B, 1DA9B–1DA9F, 1DAA1–1DAAF | 672 | L2/12-321 | N4342 | Everson, Michael; Hosken, Martin; Slevinski, Stephen; Sutton, Valerie (2012-10-16), Proposal for encoding Sutton SignWriting in the UCS |
| 8.0 | U+1D800–1DA8B, 1DA9B–1DA9F, 1DAA1–1DAAF | 672 | L2/12-343R2 | | Moore, Lisa (2012-12-04), "Consensus 133-C34", UTC #133 Minutes |
| 8.0 | U+1D800–1DA8B, 1DA9B–1DA9F, 1DAA1–1DAAF | 672 | | N4353 (pdf, doc) | "M60.13", Unconfirmed minutes of WG 2 meeting 60, 2013-05-23 |
