= Glagolitic Supplement =

- Range: U+1E000..U+1E02F (48 code points)
- Plane: SMP
- Scripts: Glagolitic
- Major alphabets: Old Slavonic
- Assigned: 38 code points
- Unused: 10 reserved code points

Unicode Version History
- 9.0 (2016): 38 (+38)

Unicode documentation
- Code chart ∣ Web page

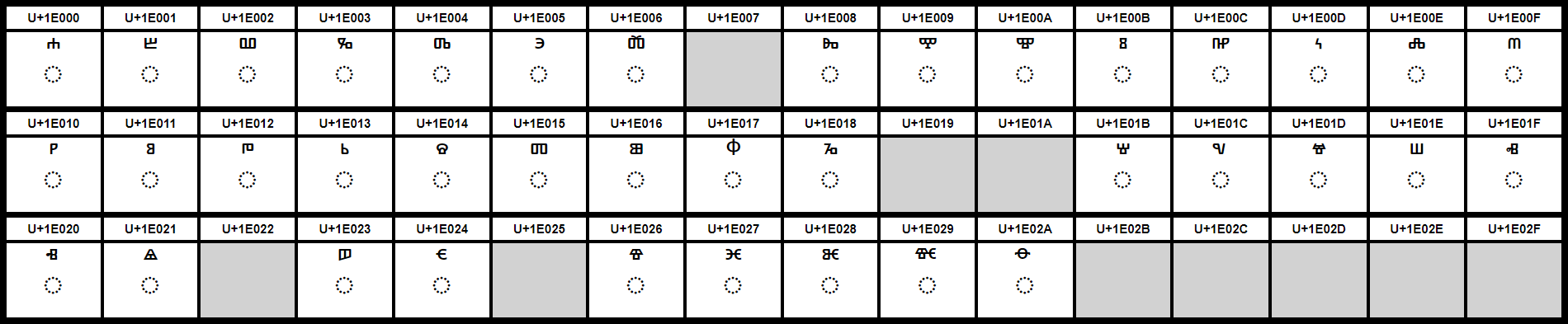
Graphical representation of the Glagolitic Supplement Unicode block

Glagolitic Supplement is a Unicode block containing supplementary characters used in the Glagolitic script. It currently contains 38 combining letters.

== Block ==
Glagolitic Supplement^{[1]}^{[2]} Official Unicode Consortium code chart (PDF)
	0	1	2	3	4	5	6	7	8	9	A	B	C	D	E	F
U+1E00x	𞀀	𞀁	𞀂	𞀃	𞀄	𞀅	𞀆		𞀈	𞀉	𞀊	𞀋	𞀌	𞀍	𞀎	𞀏
U+1E01x	𞀐	𞀑	𞀒	𞀓	𞀔	𞀕	𞀖	𞀗	𞀘			𞀛	𞀜	𞀝	𞀞	𞀟
U+1E02x	𞀠	𞀡		𞀣	𞀤		𞀦	𞀧	𞀨	𞀩	𞀪					
Notes 1.As of Unicode version 17.0 2.Grey areas indicate non-assigned code points

== History ==
The following Unicode-related documents record the purpose and process of defining specific characters in the Glagolitic Supplement block:

Version	Final code points (Note: Proposed code points and characters names may differ from final code points and names)	Count	L2 ID	WG2 ID	Document
9.0	U+1E000..1E006, 1E008..1E018, 1E01B..1E021, 1E023..1E024, 1E026..1E02A	38	L2/14-129		Anderson, Deborah; Whistler, Ken; McGowan, Rick; Pournader, Roozbeh (2014-05-02), "6", Recommendations to UTC #139 May 2014 on Script Proposals
9.0	U+1E000..1E006, 1E008..1E018, 1E01B..1E021, 1E023..1E024, 1E026..1E02A	38	L2/14-087R	N4608	Andreev, Aleksandr; Miklas, Heinz; Shardt, Yuri (2014-07-08), Proposal to Encode Combining Glagolitic Letters in Unicode
9.0	U+1E000..1E006, 1E008..1E018, 1E01B..1E021, 1E023..1E024, 1E026..1E02A	38	L2/14-103		Cleminson, Ralph; Birnbaum, David (2014-04-27), Expert Feedback on L2/14-087 Proposal to Encode Additional Glagolitic Characters
9.0	U+1E000..1E006, 1E008..1E018, 1E01B..1E021, 1E023..1E024, 1E026..1E02A	38	L2/14-165		Cleminson, Ralph; Birnbaum, David (2014-07-21), Additional Expert Feedback on L2/14-087 Proposal to Encode Additional Glagolitic Characters
9.0	U+1E000..1E006, 1E008..1E018, 1E01B..1E021, 1E023..1E024, 1E026..1E02A	38	L2/14-177		Moore, Lisa (2014-10-17), "Glagolitic (C.7)", UTC #140 Minutes
9.0	U+1E000..1E006, 1E008..1E018, 1E01B..1E021, 1E023..1E024, 1E026..1E02A	38	L2/14-259		Whistler, Ken; Anderson, Deborah (2014-10-21), WG2 Consent Docket
9.0	U+1E000..1E006, 1E008..1E018, 1E01B..1E021, 1E023..1E024, 1E026..1E02A	38	L2/14-250		Moore, Lisa (2014-11-10), "Consensus 141-C15, Action item 141-A41", UTC #141 Minutes
9.0	U+1E000..1E006, 1E008..1E018, 1E01B..1E021, 1E023..1E024, 1E026..1E02A	38	L2/15-017		Moore, Lisa (2015-02-12), "Consensus 142-C17", UTC #142 Minutes, "Change the names of U+1E001 COMBINING GLAGOLITIC LETTER BUKI and U+1E00E COMBINING GLAGOLITIC LETTER LJUDIE to U+1E001 COMBINING GLAGOLITIC LETTER BUKY and U+1E00E COMBINING GLAGOLITIC LETTER LJUDIJE."
9.0	U+1E000..1E006, 1E008..1E018, 1E01B..1E021, 1E023..1E024, 1E026..1E02A	38	L2/16-052	N4603 (pdf, doc)	Umamaheswaran, V. S. (2015-09-01), "M63.09", Unconfirmed minutes of WG 2 meeting 63
