= Unicode block =

Named range of Unicode code points

A Unicode block is one of several contiguous ranges of numeric character codes (code points) of the Unicode character set that are defined by the Unicode Consortium for administrative and documentation purposes. Typically, proposals such as the addition of new glyphs are discussed and evaluated by considering the relevant block or blocks as a whole.

Each block is generally, but not always, meant to supply glyphs used by one or more specific languages, or in some general application area such as mathematics, surveying, decorative typesetting, social forums, etc.

== Design and implementation ==
Unicode blocks are identified by unique names, which use only ASCII characters and are usually descriptive of the nature of the symbols, in English; such as "Tibetan" or "Supplemental Arrows-A". When comparing block names, one is supposed to equate uppercase with lowercase letters, and ignore any whitespace, hyphens, and underbars; so the last name is equivalent to "supplemental_arrows_a", "SupplementalArrowsA" and "SUPPLEMENTALARROWSA".

Blocks are pairwise disjoint; that is, they do not overlap. The starting code point and the size (number of code points) of each block are always multiples of 16; therefore, in the hexadecimal notation, the starting (smallest) point is U+xxx0 and the ending (largest) point is U+yyyF, where xxx and yyy are three or more hexadecimal digits. (These constraints are intended to simplify the display of glyphs in Unicode Consortium documents, as tables with 16 rows labeled with the last hexadecimal digit of the code point.) The size of a block may range from the minimum of 16 to a maximum of 65,536 code points.

Every assigned code point has a glyph property called "Block", whose value is a character string naming the unique block that owns that point. However, a block may also contain unassigned code points, usually reserved for future additions of characters that "logically" should belong to that block. Code points not belonging to any of the named blocks, e.g. in the unassigned planes 4–13, have the value block="No_Block".

Simply belonging to a particular Unicode block does not guarantee any particular properties of the characters it is expected to contain or may contain in the future. The identity of any character is determined by its properties stated in the Unicode Character Database. For example, the contiguous range of 32 noncharacter code points U+FDD0..U+FDEF share none of the properties common to the other characters in the Arabic Presentation Forms-A block, that they are certainly not Arabic script characters or "right-to-left noncharacters", and are assigned there as a filler to this block given that it has been agreed that no further Arabic compatibility characters will be encoded.

== Other classifications ==
Each Unicode point also has a property called "General Category", that attempts to describe the role of the corresponding symbol in the languages or applications for whose sake it was included in the system. Examples of General Categories are "Lu" (meaning upper-case letter), "Nd" (decimal digit), "Pi" (open-quote punctuation), and "Mn" (non-spacing mark, i.e. a diacritic for the preceding glyph). This division is completely independent of code blocks: the code points with a given General Category generally span many blocks, and do not have to be consecutive, not even within each block.

Each code point also has a script property, specifying which writing system it is intended for, or whether it is intended for multiple writing systems. This, also, is independent of block.

In descriptions of the Unicode system, a block may be subdivided into more specific subgroups, such as the "Chess symbols" in the Miscellaneous Symbols block (not to be confused with the separate Chess Symbols block). Those subgroups are not "blocks" in the technical sense used by the Unicode consortium, and are named only for the convenience of users.

== List of blocks ==
Unicode 18.0 defines 353 blocks:

- 164 in plane 0, the Basic Multilingual Plane (in table below: § BMP)
- 175 in plane 1, the Supplementary Multilingual Plane (§ SMP)
- 7 in plane 2, the Supplementary Ideographic Plane (§ SIP)
- 4 in plane 3, the Tertiary Ideographic Plane (§ TIP)
- 2 in plane 14 (E in hexadecimal), the Supplementary Special-purpose Plane (§ SSP)
- One each in the planes 15 (F_{hex}) and 16 (10_{hex}), called Supplementary Private Use Area-A and -B (§ PUA-A)

Unicode blocks and contained scripts
Plane	Block range	Block name	Code points (Note: Code point count includes unassigned code points: noncharacter, reserved etc.)	Assigned characters	Scripts (Note: The script has one or multiple characters in the block, as defined by the Script Property. This is independent of the block name) (Note: "Common" and "Unknown" (Zyyy) and "Inherited" (Zinh or Qaai) refer to Scripts in ISO 15924) (Note: Unicode Blocks data file. As of Unicode version 18.0) (Note: UAX 24: Unicode Script Property (4 alpha code)) (Note: UAX 24: Script data file)
0 BMP	U+0000..U+007F	Basic Latin (Note: Called "C0 Controls and Basic Latin" in ISO/IEC 10646)	128	128	Latin (52 characters), Common (76 characters)
0 BMP	U+0080..U+00FF	Latin-1 Supplement (Note: Called "C1 Controls and Latin-1 Supplement" in ISO/IEC 10646)	128	128	Latin (64 characters), Common (64 characters)
0 BMP	U+0100..U+017F	Latin Extended-A	128	128	Latin
0 BMP	U+0180..U+024F	Latin Extended-B	208	208	Latin
0 BMP	U+0250..U+02AF	IPA Extensions	96	96	Latin
0 BMP	U+02B0..U+02FF	Spacing Modifier Letters	80	80	Bopomofo (2 characters), Latin (14 characters), Common (64 characters)
0 BMP	U+0300..U+036F	Combining Diacritical Marks	112	112	Inherited
0 BMP	U+0370..U+03FF	Greek and Coptic	144	135	Coptic (14 characters), Greek (117 characters), Common (4 characters)
0 BMP	U+0400..U+04FF	Cyrillic	256	256	Cyrillic (254 characters), Inherited (2 characters)
0 BMP	U+0500..U+052F	Cyrillic Supplement	48	48	Cyrillic
0 BMP	U+0530..U+058F	Armenian	96	94	Armenian
0 BMP	U+0590..U+05FF	Hebrew	112	90	Hebrew
0 BMP	U+0600..U+06FF	Arabic	256	256	Arabic (238 characters), Common (6 characters), Inherited (12 characters)
0 BMP	U+0700..U+074F	Syriac	80	77	Syriac
0 BMP	U+0750..U+077F	Arabic Supplement	48	48	Arabic
0 BMP	U+0780..U+07BF	Thaana	64	50	Thaana
0 BMP	U+07C0..U+07FF	NKo	64	62	N’Ko
0 BMP	U+0800..U+083F	Samaritan	64	61	Samaritan
0 BMP	U+0840..U+085F	Mandaic	32	29	Mandaic
0 BMP	U+0860..U+086F	Syriac Supplement	16	11	Syriac
0 BMP	U+0870..U+089F	Arabic Extended-B	48	43	Arabic
0 BMP	U+08A0..U+08FF	Arabic Extended-A	96	96	Arabic (95 characters), Common (1 character)
0 BMP	U+0900..U+097F	Devanagari	128	128	Devanagari (122 characters), Common (2 characters), Inherited (4 characters)
0 BMP	U+0980..U+09FF	Bengali	128	96	Bengali
0 BMP	U+0A00..U+0A7F	Gurmukhi	128	80	Gurmukhi
0 BMP	U+0A80..U+0AFF	Gujarati	128	91	Gujarati
0 BMP	U+0B00..U+0B7F	Oriya	128	93	Oriya
0 BMP	U+0B80..U+0BFF	Tamil	128	72	Tamil
0 BMP	U+0C00..U+0C7F	Telugu	128	101	Telugu
0 BMP	U+0C80..U+0CFF	Kannada	128	92	Kannada
0 BMP	U+0D00..U+0D7F	Malayalam	128	118	Malayalam
0 BMP	U+0D80..U+0DFF	Sinhala	128	91	Sinhala
0 BMP	U+0E00..U+0E7F	Thai	128	87	Thai (86 characters), Common (1 character)
0 BMP	U+0E80..U+0EFF	Lao	128	83	Lao
0 BMP	U+0F00..U+0FFF	Tibetan	256	211	Tibetan (207 characters), Common (4 characters)
0 BMP	U+1000..U+109F	Myanmar	160	160	Myanmar
0 BMP	U+10A0..U+10FF	Georgian	96	88	Georgian (87 characters), Common (1 character)
0 BMP	U+1100..U+11FF	Hangul Jamo	256	256	Hangul
0 BMP	U+1200..U+137F	Ethiopic	384	358	Ethiopic
0 BMP	U+1380..U+139F	Ethiopic Supplement	32	26	Ethiopic
0 BMP	U+13A0..U+13FF	Cherokee	96	92	Cherokee
0 BMP	U+1400..U+167F	Unified Canadian Aboriginal Syllabics	640	640	Canadian Aboriginal
0 BMP	U+1680..U+169F	Ogham	32	29	Ogham
0 BMP	U+16A0..U+16FF	Runic	96	89	Runic (86 characters), Common (3 characters)
0 BMP	U+1700..U+171F	Tagalog	32	23	Tagalog
0 BMP	U+1720..U+173F	Hanunoo	32	23	Hanunoo (21 characters), Common (2 characters)
0 BMP	U+1740..U+175F	Buhid	32	20	Buhid
0 BMP	U+1760..U+177F	Tagbanwa	32	18	Tagbanwa
0 BMP	U+1780..U+17FF	Khmer	128	114	Khmer
0 BMP	U+1800..U+18AF	Mongolian	176	158	Mongolian (155 characters), Common (3 characters)
0 BMP	U+18B0..U+18FF	Unified Canadian Aboriginal Syllabics Extended	80	70	Canadian Aboriginal
0 BMP	U+1900..U+194F	Limbu	80	68	Limbu
0 BMP	U+1950..U+197F	Tai Le	48	35	Tai Le
0 BMP	U+1980..U+19DF	New Tai Lue	96	83	New Tai Lue
0 BMP	U+19E0..U+19FF	Khmer Symbols	32	32	Khmer
0 BMP	U+1A00..U+1A1F	Buginese	32	30	Buginese
0 BMP	U+1A20..U+1AAF	Tai Tham	144	127	Tai Tham
0 BMP	U+1AB0..U+1AFF	Combining Diacritical Marks Extended	80	65	Inherited
0 BMP	U+1B00..U+1B7F	Balinese	128	127	Balinese
0 BMP	U+1B80..U+1BBF	Sundanese	64	64	Sundanese
0 BMP	U+1BC0..U+1BFF	Batak	64	56	Batak
0 BMP	U+1C00..U+1C4F	Lepcha	80	74	Lepcha
0 BMP	U+1C50..U+1C7F	Ol Chiki	48	48	Ol Chiki
0 BMP	U+1C80..U+1C8F	Cyrillic Extended-C	16	11	Cyrillic
0 BMP	U+1C90..U+1CBF	Georgian Extended	48	46	Georgian
0 BMP	U+1CC0..U+1CCF	Sundanese Supplement	16	8	Sundanese
0 BMP	U+1CD0..U+1CFF	Vedic Extensions	48	43	Common (16 characters), Inherited (27 characters)
0 BMP	U+1D00..U+1D7F	Phonetic Extensions	128	128	Cyrillic (2 characters), Greek (15 characters), Latin (111 characters)
0 BMP	U+1D80..U+1DBF	Phonetic Extensions Supplement	64	64	Greek (1 character), Latin (63 characters)
0 BMP	U+1DC0..U+1DFF	Combining Diacritical Marks Supplement	64	64	Inherited
0 BMP	U+1E00..U+1EFF	Latin Extended Additional	256	256	Latin
0 BMP	U+1F00..U+1FFF	Greek Extended	256	233	Greek
0 BMP	U+2000..U+206F	General Punctuation	112	111	Common (109 characters), Inherited (2 characters)
0 BMP	U+2070..U+209F	Superscripts and Subscripts	48	46	Latin (18 characters), Common (28 characters)
0 BMP	U+20A0..U+20CF	Currency Symbols	48	37	Common
0 BMP	U+20D0..U+20FF	Combining Diacritical Marks for Symbols	48	33	Inherited
0 BMP	U+2100..U+214F	Letterlike Symbols	80	80	Greek (1 character), Latin (4 characters), Common (75 characters)
0 BMP	U+2150..U+218F	Number Forms	64	60	Latin (41 characters), Common (19 characters)
0 BMP	U+2190..U+21FF	Arrows	112	112	Common
0 BMP	U+2200..U+22FF	Mathematical Operators	256	256	Common
0 BMP	U+2300..U+23FF	Miscellaneous Technical	256	256	Common
0 BMP	U+2400..U+243F	Control Pictures	64	42	Common
0 BMP	U+2440..U+245F	Optical Character Recognition	32	11	Common
0 BMP	U+2460..U+24FF	Enclosed Alphanumerics	160	160	Common
0 BMP	U+2500..U+257F	Box Drawing	128	128	Common
0 BMP	U+2580..U+259F	Block Elements	32	32	Common
0 BMP	U+25A0..U+25FF	Geometric Shapes	96	96	Common
0 BMP	U+2600..U+26FF	Miscellaneous Symbols	256	256	Common
0 BMP	U+2700..U+27BF	Dingbats	192	192	Common
0 BMP	U+27C0..U+27EF	Miscellaneous Mathematical Symbols-A	48	48	Common
0 BMP	U+27F0..U+27FF	Supplemental Arrows-A	16	16	Common
0 BMP	U+2800..U+28FF	Braille Patterns	256	256	Braille
0 BMP	U+2900..U+297F	Supplemental Arrows-B	128	128	Common
0 BMP	U+2980..U+29FF	Miscellaneous Mathematical Symbols-B	128	128	Common
0 BMP	U+2A00..U+2AFF	Supplemental Mathematical Operators	256	256	Common
0 BMP	U+2B00..U+2BFF	Miscellaneous Symbols and Arrows	256	254	Common
0 BMP	U+2C00..U+2C5F	Glagolitic	96	96	Glagolitic
0 BMP	U+2C60..U+2C7F	Latin Extended-C	32	32	Latin
0 BMP	U+2C80..U+2CFF	Coptic	128	123	Coptic
0 BMP	U+2D00..U+2D2F	Georgian Supplement	48	40	Georgian
0 BMP	U+2D30..U+2D7F	Tifinagh	80	59	Tifinagh
0 BMP	U+2D80..U+2DDF	Ethiopic Extended	96	79	Ethiopic
0 BMP	U+2DE0..U+2DFF	Cyrillic Extended-A	32	32	Cyrillic
0 BMP	U+2E00..U+2E7F	Supplemental Punctuation	128	98	Common
0 BMP	U+2E80..U+2EFF	CJK Radicals Supplement	128	115	Han
0 BMP	U+2F00..U+2FDF	Kangxi Radicals	224	214	Han
0 BMP	U+2FF0..U+2FFF	Ideographic Description Characters	16	16	Common
0 BMP	U+3000..U+303F	CJK Symbols and Punctuation	64	64	Han (15 characters), Hangul (2 characters), Common (43 characters), Inherited (4 characters)
0 BMP	U+3040..U+309F	Hiragana	96	93	Hiragana (89 characters), Common (2 characters), Inherited (2 characters)
0 BMP	U+30A0..U+30FF	Katakana	96	96	Katakana (93 characters), Common (3 characters)
0 BMP	U+3100..U+312F	Bopomofo	48	43	Bopomofo
0 BMP	U+3130..U+318F	Hangul Compatibility Jamo	96	94	Hangul
0 BMP	U+3190..U+319F	Kanbun	16	16	Common
0 BMP	U+31A0..U+31BF	Bopomofo Extended	32	32	Bopomofo
0 BMP	U+31C0..U+31EF	CJK Strokes	48	39	Common
0 BMP	U+31F0..U+31FF	Katakana Phonetic Extensions	16	16	Katakana
0 BMP	U+3200..U+32FF	Enclosed CJK Letters and Months	256	255	Hangul (62 characters), Katakana (47 characters), Common (146 characters)
0 BMP	U+3300..U+33FF	CJK Compatibility	256	256	Katakana (88 characters), Common (168 characters)
0 BMP	U+3400..U+4DBF	CJK Unified Ideographs Extension A	6,592	6,592	Han
0 BMP	U+4DC0..U+4DFF	Yijing Hexagram Symbols	64	64	Common
0 BMP	U+4E00..U+9FFF	CJK Unified Ideographs	20,992	20,992	Han
0 BMP	U+A000..U+A48F	Yi Syllables	1,168	1,165	Yi
0 BMP	U+A490..U+A4CF	Yi Radicals	64	55	Yi
0 BMP	U+A4D0..U+A4FF	Lisu	48	48	Lisu
0 BMP	U+A500..U+A63F	Vai	320	300	Vai
0 BMP	U+A640..U+A69F	Cyrillic Extended-B	96	96	Cyrillic
0 BMP	U+A6A0..U+A6FF	Bamum	96	88	Bamum
0 BMP	U+A700..U+A71F	Modifier Tone Letters	32	32	Common
0 BMP	U+A720..U+A7FF	Latin Extended-D	224	206	Latin (201 characters), Common (5 characters)
0 BMP	U+A800..U+A82F	Syloti Nagri	48	45	Syloti Nagri
0 BMP	U+A830..U+A83F	Common Indic Number Forms	16	10	Common
0 BMP	U+A840..U+A87F	Phags-pa	64	56	Phags Pa
0 BMP	U+A880..U+A8DF	Saurashtra	96	82	Saurashtra
0 BMP	U+A8E0..U+A8FF	Devanagari Extended	32	32	Devanagari
0 BMP	U+A900..U+A92F	Kayah Li	48	48	Kayah Li (47 characters), Common (1 character)
0 BMP	U+A930..U+A95F	Rejang	48	37	Rejang
0 BMP	U+A960..U+A97F	Hangul Jamo Extended-A	32	29	Hangul
0 BMP	U+A980..U+A9DF	Javanese	96	91	Javanese (90 characters), Common (1 character)
0 BMP	U+A9E0..U+A9FF	Myanmar Extended-B	32	31	Myanmar
0 BMP	U+AA00..U+AA5F	Cham	96	83	Cham
0 BMP	U+AA60..U+AA7F	Myanmar Extended-A	32	32	Myanmar
0 BMP	U+AA80..U+AADF	Tai Viet	96	72	Tai Viet
0 BMP	U+AAE0..U+AAFF	Meetei Mayek Extensions	32	23	Meetei Mayek
0 BMP	U+AB00..U+AB2F	Ethiopic Extended-A	48	32	Ethiopic
0 BMP	U+AB30..U+AB6F	Latin Extended-E	64	62	Latin (58 characters), Greek (1 character), Common (3 characters)
0 BMP	U+AB70..U+ABBF	Cherokee Supplement	80	80	Cherokee
0 BMP	U+ABC0..U+ABFF	Meetei Mayek	64	56	Meetei Mayek
0 BMP	U+AC00..U+D7AF	Hangul Syllables	11,184	11,172	Hangul
0 BMP	U+D7B0..U+D7FF	Hangul Jamo Extended-B	80	72	Hangul
0 BMP	U+D800..U+DB7F	High Surrogates	896	0	Unknown
0 BMP	U+DB80..U+DBFF	High Private Use Surrogates	128	0	Unknown
0 BMP	U+DC00..U+DFFF	Low Surrogates	1,024	0	Unknown
0 BMP	U+E000..U+F8FF	Private Use Area	6,400	6,400	Unknown
0 BMP	U+F900..U+FAFF	CJK Compatibility Ideographs	512	472	Han
0 BMP	U+FB00..U+FB4F	Alphabetic Presentation Forms	80	58	Armenian (5 characters), Hebrew (46 characters), Latin (7 characters)
0 BMP	U+FB50..U+FDFF	Arabic Presentation Forms-A	688	656	Arabic (654 characters), Common (2 characters)
0 BMP	U+FE00..U+FE0F	Variation Selectors	16	16	Inherited
0 BMP	U+FE10..U+FE1F	Vertical Forms	16	10	Common
0 BMP	U+FE20..U+FE2F	Combining Half Marks	16	16	Cyrillic (2 characters), Inherited (14 characters)
0 BMP	U+FE30..U+FE4F	CJK Compatibility Forms	32	32	Common
0 BMP	U+FE50..U+FE6F	Small Form Variants	32	26	Common
0 BMP	U+FE70..U+FEFF	Arabic Presentation Forms-B	144	141	Arabic (140 characters), Common (1 character)
0 BMP	U+FF00..U+FFEF	Halfwidth and Fullwidth Forms	240	225	Hangul (52 characters), Katakana (55 characters), Latin (52 characters), Common (66 characters)
0 BMP	U+FFF0..U+FFFF	Specials	16	5	Common
1 SMP	U+10000..U+1007F	Linear B Syllabary	128	88	Linear B
1 SMP	U+10080..U+100FF	Linear B Ideograms	128	123	Linear B
1 SMP	U+10100..U+1013F	Aegean Numbers	64	57	Common
1 SMP	U+10140..U+1018F	Ancient Greek Numbers	80	79	Greek
1 SMP	U+10190..U+101CF	Ancient Symbols	64	14	Greek (1 character), Common (13 characters)
1 SMP	U+101D0..U+101FF	Phaistos Disc	48	46	Common (45 characters), Inherited (1 character)
1 SMP	U+10280..U+1029F	Lycian	32	29	Lycian
1 SMP	U+102A0..U+102DF	Carian	64	49	Carian
1 SMP	U+102E0..U+102FF	Coptic Epact Numbers	32	28	Common (27 characters), Inherited (1 character)
1 SMP	U+10300..U+1032F	Old Italic	48	39	Old Italic
1 SMP	U+10330..U+1034F	Gothic	32	27	Gothic
1 SMP	U+10350..U+1037F	Old Permic	48	43	Old Permic
1 SMP	U+10380..U+1039F	Ugaritic	32	31	Ugaritic
1 SMP	U+103A0..U+103DF	Old Persian	64	50	Old Persian
1 SMP	U+10400..U+1044F	Deseret	80	80	Deseret
1 SMP	U+10450..U+1047F	Shavian	48	48	Shavian
1 SMP	U+10480..U+104AF	Osmanya	48	40	Osmanya
1 SMP	U+104B0..U+104FF	Osage	80	72	Osage
1 SMP	U+10500..U+1052F	Elbasan	48	40	Elbasan
1 SMP	U+10530..U+1056F	Caucasian Albanian	64	53	Caucasian Albanian
1 SMP	U+10570..U+105BF	Vithkuqi	80	70	Vithkuqi
1 SMP	U+105C0..U+105FF	Todhri	64	52	Todhri
1 SMP	U+10600..U+1077F	Linear A	384	341	Linear A
1 SMP	U+10780..U+107BF	Latin Extended-F	64	62	Latin
1 SMP	U+10800..U+1083F	Cypriot Syllabary	64	55	Cypriot
1 SMP	U+10840..U+1085F	Imperial Aramaic	32	31	Imperial Aramaic
1 SMP	U+10860..U+1087F	Palmyrene	32	32	Palmyrene
1 SMP	U+10880..U+108AF	Nabataean	48	40	Nabataean
1 SMP	U+108E0..U+108FF	Hatran	32	26	Hatran
1 SMP	U+10900..U+1091F	Phoenician	32	29	Phoenician
1 SMP	U+10920..U+1093F	Lydian	32	27	Lydian
1 SMP	U+10940..U+1095F	Sidetic	32	26	Sidetic
1 SMP	U+10980..U+1099F	Meroitic Hieroglyphs	32	32	Meroitic Hieroglyphs
1 SMP	U+109A0..U+109FF	Meroitic Cursive	96	90	Meroitic Cursive
1 SMP	U+10A00..U+10A5F	Kharoshthi	96	68	Kharoshthi
1 SMP	U+10A60..U+10A7F	Old South Arabian	32	32	Old South Arabian
1 SMP	U+10A80..U+10A9F	Old North Arabian	32	32	Old North Arabian
1 SMP	U+10AC0..U+10AFF	Manichaean	64	51	Manichaean
1 SMP	U+10B00..U+10B3F	Avestan	64	61	Avestan
1 SMP	U+10B40..U+10B5F	Inscriptional Parthian	32	30	Inscriptional Parthian
1 SMP	U+10B60..U+10B7F	Inscriptional Pahlavi	32	27	Inscriptional Pahlavi
1 SMP	U+10B80..U+10BAF	Psalter Pahlavi	48	29	Psalter Pahlavi
1 SMP	U+10C00..U+10C4F	Old Turkic	80	73	Old Turkic
1 SMP	U+10C80..U+10CFF	Old Hungarian	128	108	Old Hungarian
1 SMP	U+10D00..U+10D3F	Hanifi Rohingya	64	50	Hanifi Rohingya
1 SMP	U+10D40..U+10D8F	Garay	80	69	Garay
1 SMP	U+10E60..U+10E7F	Rumi Numeral Symbols	32	31	Arabic
1 SMP	U+10E80..U+10EBF	Yezidi	64	47	Yezidi
1 SMP	U+10EC0..U+10EFF	Arabic Extended-C	64	60	Arabic
1 SMP	U+10F00..U+10F2F	Old Sogdian	48	40	Old Sogdian
1 SMP	U+10F30..U+10F6F	Sogdian	64	42	Sogdian
1 SMP	U+10F70..U+10FAF	Old Uyghur	64	26	Old Uyghur
1 SMP	U+10FB0..U+10FDF	Chorasmian	48	28	Chorasmian
1 SMP	U+10FE0..U+10FFF	Elymaic	32	23	Elymaic
1 SMP	U+11000..U+1107F	Brahmi	128	115	Brahmi
1 SMP	U+11080..U+110CF	Kaithi	80	68	Kaithi
1 SMP	U+110D0..U+110FF	Sora Sompeng	48	35	Sora Sompeng
1 SMP	U+11100..U+1114F	Chakma	80	71	Chakma
1 SMP	U+11150..U+1117F	Mahajani	48	39	Mahajani
1 SMP	U+11180..U+111DF	Sharada	96	96	Sharada
1 SMP	U+111E0..U+111FF	Sinhala Archaic Numbers	32	20	Sinhala
1 SMP	U+11200..U+1124F	Khojki	80	65	Khojki
1 SMP	U+11280..U+112AF	Multani	48	38	Multani
1 SMP	U+112B0..U+112FF	Khudawadi	80	69	Khudawadi
1 SMP	U+11300..U+1137F	Grantha	128	86	Grantha (85 characters), Inherited (1 character)
1 SMP	U+11380..U+113FF	Tulu-Tigalari	128	80	Tulu Tigalari
1 SMP	U+11400..U+1147F	Newa	128	97	Newa
1 SMP	U+11480..U+114DF	Tirhuta	96	82	Tirhuta
1 SMP	U+11580..U+115FF	Siddham	128	92	Siddham
1 SMP	U+11600..U+1165F	Modi	96	79	Modi
1 SMP	U+11660..U+1167F	Mongolian Supplement	32	13	Mongolian
1 SMP	U+11680..U+116CF	Takri	80	68	Takri
1 SMP	U+116D0..U+116FF	Myanmar Extended-C	48	20	Myanmar
1 SMP	U+11700..U+1174F	Ahom	80	65	Ahom
1 SMP	U+11800..U+1184F	Dogra	80	60	Dogra
1 SMP	U+118A0..U+118FF	Warang Citi	96	84	Warang Citi
1 SMP	U+11900..U+1195F	Dives Akuru	96	72	Dives Akuru
1 SMP	U+119A0..U+119FF	Nandinagari	96	65	Nandinagari
1 SMP	U+11A00..U+11A4F	Zanabazar Square	80	72	Zanabazar Square
1 SMP	U+11A50..U+11AAF	Soyombo	96	83	Soyombo
1 SMP	U+11AB0..U+11ABF	Unified Canadian Aboriginal Syllabics Extended-A	16	16	Canadian Aboriginal
1 SMP	U+11AC0..U+11AFF	Pau Cin Hau	64	57	Pau Cin Hau
1 SMP	U+11B00..U+11B5F	Devanagari Extended-A	96	11	Devanagari
1 SMP	U+11B60..U+11B7F	Sharada Supplement	32	8	Sharada
1 SMP	U+11BC0..U+11BFF	Sunuwar	64	44	Sunuwar
1 SMP	U+11C00..U+11C6F	Bhaiksuki	112	97	Bhaiksuki
1 SMP	U+11C70..U+11CBF	Marchen	80	68	Marchen
1 SMP	U+11D00..U+11D5F	Masaram Gondi	96	75	Masaram Gondi
1 SMP	U+11D60..U+11DAF	Gunjala Gondi	80	63	Gunjala Gondi
1 SMP	U+11DB0..U+11DEF	Tolong Siki	64	54	Tolong Siki
1 SMP	U+11DF0..U+11DFF	Bengali Supplement	16	2	Bengali
1 SMP	U+11EE0..U+11EFF	Makasar	32	25	Makasar
1 SMP	U+11F00..U+11F5F	Kawi	96	87	Kawi
1 SMP	U+11FB0..U+11FBF	Lisu Supplement	16	1	Lisu
1 SMP	U+11FC0..U+11FFF	Tamil Supplement	64	51	Tamil
1 SMP	U+12000..U+123FF	Cuneiform	1,024	922	Cuneiform
1 SMP	U+12400..U+1247F	Cuneiform Numbers and Punctuation	128	128	Cuneiform
1 SMP	U+12480..U+1254F	Early Dynastic Cuneiform	208	196	Cuneiform
1 SMP	U+12550..U+1268F	Archaic Cuneiform Numerals	320	311	Cuneiform (147 characters), Proto Cuneiform (164 characters)
1 SMP	U+12F90..U+12FFF	Cypro-Minoan	112	99	Cypro Minoan
1 SMP	U+13000..U+1342F	Egyptian Hieroglyphs	1,072	1,072	Egyptian Hieroglyphs
1 SMP	U+13430..U+1345F	Egyptian Hieroglyph Format Controls	48	38	Egyptian Hieroglyphs
1 SMP	U+13460..U+143FF	Egyptian Hieroglyphs Extended-A	4,000	3,995	Egyptian Hieroglyphs
1 SMP	U+14400..U+1467F	Anatolian Hieroglyphs	640	583	Anatolian Hieroglyphs
1 SMP	U+16100..U+1613F	Gurung Khema	64	58	Gurung Khema
1 SMP	U+16800..U+16A3F	Bamum Supplement	576	569	Bamum
1 SMP	U+16A40..U+16A6F	Mro	48	43	Mro
1 SMP	U+16A70..U+16ACF	Tangsa	96	89	Tangsa
1 SMP	U+16AD0..U+16AFF	Bassa Vah	48	36	Bassa Vah
1 SMP	U+16B00..U+16B8F	Pahawh Hmong	144	127	Pahawh Hmong
1 SMP	U+16D40..U+16D7F	Kirat Rai	64	58	Kirat Rai
1 SMP	U+16E40..U+16E9F	Medefaidrin	96	91	Medefaidrin
1 SMP	U+16EA0..U+16EDF	Beria Erfe	64	50	Beria Erfe
1 SMP	U+16F00..U+16F9F	Miao	160	149	Miao
1 SMP	U+16FE0..U+16FFF	Ideographic Symbols and Punctuation	32	12	Han (9 characters), Khitan Small Script (1 character), Nushu (1 character), Tangut (1 character)
1 SMP	U+17000..U+187FF	Tangut	6,144	6,144	Tangut
1 SMP	U+18800..U+18AFF	Tangut Components	768	768	Tangut
1 SMP	U+18B00..U+18CFF	Khitan Small Script	512	476	Khitan Small Script
1 SMP	U+18D00..U+18D7F	Tangut Supplement	128	33	Tangut
1 SMP	U+18D80..U+18DFF	Tangut Components Supplement	128	115	Tangut
1 SMP	U+18E00..U+1919F	Jurchen	928	914	Jurchen
1 SMP	U+191A0..U+191DF	Jurchen Radicals	64	51	Jurchen
1 SMP	U+1AFF0..U+1AFFF	Kana Extended-B	16	13	Katakana
1 SMP	U+1B000..U+1B0FF	Kana Supplement	256	256	Hiragana (255 characters), Katakana (1 character)
1 SMP	U+1B100..U+1B12F	Kana Extended-A	48	41	Hiragana (33 characters), Katakana (8 characters)
1 SMP	U+1B130..U+1B16F	Small Kana Extension	64	10	Hiragana (4 characters), Katakana (6 characters)
1 SMP	U+1B170..U+1B2FF	Nushu	400	396	Nüshu
1 SMP	U+1BC00..U+1BC9F	Duployan	160	143	Duployan
1 SMP	U+1BCA0..U+1BCAF	Shorthand Format Controls	16	4	Common
1 SMP	U+1CC00..U+1CEBF	Symbols for Legacy Computing Supplement	704	695	Common
1 SMP	U+1CEC0..U+1CEFF	Miscellaneous Symbols Supplement	64	53	Common
1 SMP	U+1CF00..U+1CFCF	Znamenny Musical Notation	208	185	Common (116 characters), Inherited (69 characters)
1 SMP	U+1D000..U+1D0FF	Byzantine Musical Symbols	256	246	Common
1 SMP	U+1D100..U+1D1FF	Musical Symbols	256	256	Common (232 characters), Inherited (24 characters)
1 SMP	U+1D200..U+1D24F	Ancient Greek Musical Notation	80	70	Greek
1 SMP	U+1D250..U+1D28F	Musical Symbols Supplement	64	50	Common (48 characters), Inherited (2 characters)
1 SMP	U+1D2C0..U+1D2DF	Kaktovik Numerals	32	20	Common
1 SMP	U+1D2E0..U+1D2FF	Mayan Numerals	32	20	Common
1 SMP	U+1D300..U+1D35F	Tai Xuan Jing Symbols	96	87	Common
1 SMP	U+1D360..U+1D37F	Counting Rod Numerals	32	25	Common
1 SMP	U+1D400..U+1D7FF	Mathematical Alphanumeric Symbols	1,024	997	Common
1 SMP	U+1D800..U+1DAAF	Sutton SignWriting	688	672	SignWriting
1 SMP	U+1DB00..U+1DBFF	Miscellaneous Symbols and Arrows Extended	256	29	Common
1 SMP	U+1DF00..U+1DFFF	Latin Extended-G	256	188	Greek (2 characters), Latin (186 characters)
1 SMP	U+1E000..U+1E02F	Glagolitic Supplement	48	38	Glagolitic
1 SMP	U+1E030..U+1E08F	Cyrillic Extended-D	96	63	Cyrillic
1 SMP	U+1E100..U+1E14F	Nyiakeng Puachue Hmong	80	71	Nyiakeng Puachue Hmong
1 SMP	U+1E290..U+1E2BF	Toto	48	31	Toto
1 SMP	U+1E2C0..U+1E2FF	Wancho	64	59	Wancho
1 SMP	U+1E4D0..U+1E4FF	Nag Mundari	48	42	Mundari
1 SMP	U+1E5D0..U+1E5FF	Ol Onal	48	44	Ol Onal
1 SMP	U+1E6C0..U+1E6FF	Tai Yo	64	55	Tai Yo
1 SMP	U+1E7E0..U+1E7FF	Ethiopic Extended-B	32	28	Ethiopic
1 SMP	U+1E800..U+1E8DF	Mende Kikakui	224	213	Mende Kikakui
1 SMP	U+1E900..U+1E95F	Adlam	96	88	Adlam
1 SMP	U+1EC70..U+1ECBF	Indic Siyaq Numbers	80	68	Common
1 SMP	U+1ED00..U+1ED4F	Ottoman Siyaq Numbers	80	61	Common
1 SMP	U+1EE00..U+1EEFF	Arabic Mathematical Alphabetic Symbols	256	143	Arabic
1 SMP	U+1F000..U+1F02F	Mahjong Tiles	48	44	Common
1 SMP	U+1F030..U+1F09F	Domino Tiles	112	100	Common
1 SMP	U+1F0A0..U+1F0FF	Playing Cards	96	82	Common
1 SMP	U+1F100..U+1F1FF	Enclosed Alphanumeric Supplement	256	201	Common
1 SMP	U+1F200..U+1F2FF	Enclosed Ideographic Supplement	256	64	Hiragana (1 character), Common (63 characters)
1 SMP	U+1F300..U+1F5FF	Miscellaneous Symbols and Pictographs	768	768	Common
1 SMP	U+1F600..U+1F64F	Emoticons	80	80	Common
1 SMP	U+1F650..U+1F67F	Ornamental Dingbats	48	48	Common
1 SMP	U+1F680..U+1F6FF	Transport and Map Symbols	128	120	Common
1 SMP	U+1F700..U+1F77F	Alchemical Symbols	128	128	Common
1 SMP	U+1F780..U+1F7FF	Geometric Shapes Extended	128	120	Common
1 SMP	U+1F800..U+1F8FF	Supplemental Arrows-C	256	171	Common
1 SMP	U+1F900..U+1F9FF	Supplemental Symbols and Pictographs	256	256	Common
1 SMP	U+1FA00..U+1FA6F	Chess Symbols	112	102	Common
1 SMP	U+1FA70..U+1FAFF	Symbols and Pictographs Extended-A	144	128	Common
1 SMP	U+1FB00..U+1FBFF	Symbols for Legacy Computing	256	250	Common
2 SIP	U+20000..U+2A6DF	CJK Unified Ideographs Extension B	42,720	42,720	Han
2 SIP	U+2A700..U+2B73F	CJK Unified Ideographs Extension C	4,160	4,160	Han
2 SIP	U+2B740..U+2B81F	CJK Unified Ideographs Extension D	224	223	Han
2 SIP	U+2B820..U+2CEAF	CJK Unified Ideographs Extension E	5,776	5,774	Han
2 SIP	U+2CEB0..U+2EBEF	CJK Unified Ideographs Extension F	7,488	7,473	Han
2 SIP	U+2EBF0..U+2EE5F	CJK Unified Ideographs Extension I	624	622	Han
2 SIP	U+2F800..U+2FA1F	CJK Compatibility Ideographs Supplement	544	542	Han
3 TIP	U+30000..U+3134F	CJK Unified Ideographs Extension G	4,944	4,939	Han
3 TIP	U+31350..U+323AF	CJK Unified Ideographs Extension H	4,192	4,192	Han
3 TIP	U+323B0..U+3347F	CJK Unified Ideographs Extension J	4,304	4,298	Han
3 TIP	U+3D000..U+3FC3F	Seal	11,328	11,328	Seal
14 SSP	U+E0000..U+E007F	Tags	128	97	Common
14 SSP	U+E0100..U+E01EF	Variation Selectors Supplement	240	240	Inherited
15 PUA-A	U+F0000..U+FFFFF	Supplementary Private Use Area-A	65,536	65,534	Unknown
16 PUA-B	U+100000..U+10FFFF	Supplementary Private Use Area-B	65,536	65,534	Unknown

== Moved blocks ==
The Unicode Stability Policy requires that a character, once assigned, may not be moved or removed, although it may be deprecated. This applies to Unicode 2.0 and all subsequent versions.

Prior to this, the following former blocks were moved:

Former Unicode blocks from before Unicode 2.0
Block range	Historical block name	Version when added	Version when removed	Range now occupied by	Superseded by block	Code points	Assigned characters	Scripts
U+1000..U+105F	Tibetan	1.0.0	1.0.1	Myanmar	Tibetan	96	71	Tibetan
U+3400..U+3D2D	Hangul	1.0.0	2.0	CJK Unified Ideographs Extension A	Hangul Syllables	2350	2350	Hangul
U+3D2E..U+44B7	Hangul Supplementary-A	1.1	2.0	CJK Unified Ideographs Extension A	Hangul Syllables	1930	1930	Hangul
U+44B8..U+4DFF	Hangul Supplementary-B	1.1	2.0	CJK Unified Ideographs Extension A and Yijing Hexagram Symbols	Hangul Syllables	2376	2376	Hangul

Basic		Supplementary							
Plane 0		Plane 1		Plane 2		Plane 3	Planes 4–13	Plane 14	Planes 15–16
0000–FFFF		10000–1FFFF		20000–2FFFF		30000–3FFFF	40000–DFFFF	E0000–EFFFF	F0000–10FFFF
Basic Multilingual Plane		Supplementary Multilingual Plane		Supplementary Ideographic Plane		Tertiary Ideographic Plane	unassigned	Supplementary Special-purpose Plane	Supplementary Private Use Area planes
BMP		SMP		SIP		TIP	—	SSP	SPUA-A/B
0000–0FFF; 1000–1FFF; 2000–2FFF; 3000–3FFF; 4000–4FFF; 5000–5FFF; 6000–6FFF; 7000–7FFF	8000–8FFF; 9000–9FFF; A000–AFFF; B000–BFFF; C000–CFFF; D000–DFFF; E000–EFFF; F000–FFFF	10000–10FFF; 11000–11FFF; 12000–12FFF; 13000–13FFF; 14000–14FFF 16000–16FFF; 17000–17FFF	18000–18FFF; 19000–19FFF; 1A000–1AFFF; 1B000–1BFFF; 1C000–1CFFF; 1D000–1DFFF; 1E000–1EFFF; 1F000–1FFFF	20000–20FFF; 21000–21FFF; 22000–22FFF; 23000–23FFF; 24000–24FFF; 25000–25FFF; 26000–26FFF; 27000–27FFF	28000–28FFF; 29000–29FFF; 2A000–2AFFF; 2B000–2BFFF; 2C000–2CFFF; 2D000–2DFFF; 2E000–2EFFF; 2F000–2FFFF	30000–30FFF; 31000–31FFF; 32000–32FFF; 33000–33FFF 3D000–3DFFF; 3E000–3EFFF; 3F000–3FFFF		E0000–E0FFF	15: SPUA-A; F0000–FFFFF 16: SPUA-B; 100000–10FFFF
