= Linear A (Unicode block) =

- Range: U+10600..U+1077F (384 code points)
- Plane: SMP
- Scripts: Linear A
- Major alphabets: Linear A
- Assigned: 341 code points
- Unused: 43 reserved code points

Unicode version history
- 7.0 (2014): 341 (+341)

Unicode documentation
- Code chart ∣ Web page

Linear A is a Unicode block containing the characters of the ancient, undeciphered Linear A.

== Block ==
Linear A^{[1]}^{[2]} Official Unicode Consortium code chart (PDF)
	0	1	2	3	4	5	6	7	8	9	A	B	C	D	E	F
U+1060x	𐘀	𐘁	𐘂	𐘃	𐘄	𐘅	𐘆	𐘇	𐘈	𐘉	𐘊	𐘋	𐘌	𐘍	𐘎	𐘏
U+1061x	𐘐	𐘑	𐘒	𐘓	𐘔	𐘕	𐘖	𐘗	𐘘	𐘙	𐘚	𐘛	𐘜	𐘝	𐘞	𐘟
U+1062x	𐘠	𐘡	𐘢	𐘣	𐘤	𐘥	𐘦	𐘧	𐘨	𐘩	𐘪	𐘫	𐘬	𐘭	𐘮	𐘯
U+1063x	𐘰	𐘱	𐘲	𐘳	𐘴	𐘵	𐘶	𐘷	𐘸	𐘹	𐘺	𐘻	𐘼	𐘽	𐘾	𐘿
U+1064x	𐙀	𐙁	𐙂	𐙃	𐙄	𐙅	𐙆	𐙇	𐙈	𐙉	𐙊	𐙋	𐙌	𐙍	𐙎	𐙏
U+1065x	𐙐	𐙑	𐙒	𐙓	𐙔	𐙕	𐙖	𐙗	𐙘	𐙙	𐙚	𐙛	𐙜	𐙝	𐙞	𐙟
U+1066x	𐙠	𐙡	𐙢	𐙣	𐙤	𐙥	𐙦	𐙧	𐙨	𐙩	𐙪	𐙫	𐙬	𐙭	𐙮	𐙯
U+1067x	𐙰	𐙱	𐙲	𐙳	𐙴	𐙵	𐙶	𐙷	𐙸	𐙹	𐙺	𐙻	𐙼	𐙽	𐙾	𐙿
U+1068x	𐚀	𐚁	𐚂	𐚃	𐚄	𐚅	𐚆	𐚇	𐚈	𐚉	𐚊	𐚋	𐚌	𐚍	𐚎	𐚏
U+1069x	𐚐	𐚑	𐚒	𐚓	𐚔	𐚕	𐚖	𐚗	𐚘	𐚙	𐚚	𐚛	𐚜	𐚝	𐚞	𐚟
U+106Ax	𐚠	𐚡	𐚢	𐚣	𐚤	𐚥	𐚦	𐚧	𐚨	𐚩	𐚪	𐚫	𐚬	𐚭	𐚮	𐚯
U+106Bx	𐚰	𐚱	𐚲	𐚳	𐚴	𐚵	𐚶	𐚷	𐚸	𐚹	𐚺	𐚻	𐚼	𐚽	𐚾	𐚿
U+106Cx	𐛀	𐛁	𐛂	𐛃	𐛄	𐛅	𐛆	𐛇	𐛈	𐛉	𐛊	𐛋	𐛌	𐛍	𐛎	𐛏
U+106Dx	𐛐	𐛑	𐛒	𐛓	𐛔	𐛕	𐛖	𐛗	𐛘	𐛙	𐛚	𐛛	𐛜	𐛝	𐛞	𐛟
U+106Ex	𐛠	𐛡	𐛢	𐛣	𐛤	𐛥	𐛦	𐛧	𐛨	𐛩	𐛪	𐛫	𐛬	𐛭	𐛮	𐛯
U+106Fx	𐛰	𐛱	𐛲	𐛳	𐛴	𐛵	𐛶	𐛷	𐛸	𐛹	𐛺	𐛻	𐛼	𐛽	𐛾	𐛿
U+1070x	𐜀	𐜁	𐜂	𐜃	𐜄	𐜅	𐜆	𐜇	𐜈	𐜉	𐜊	𐜋	𐜌	𐜍	𐜎	𐜏
U+1071x	𐜐	𐜑	𐜒	𐜓	𐜔	𐜕	𐜖	𐜗	𐜘	𐜙	𐜚	𐜛	𐜜	𐜝	𐜞	𐜟
U+1072x	𐜠	𐜡	𐜢	𐜣	𐜤	𐜥	𐜦	𐜧	𐜨	𐜩	𐜪	𐜫	𐜬	𐜭	𐜮	𐜯
U+1073x	𐜰	𐜱	𐜲	𐜳	𐜴	𐜵	𐜶									
U+1074x	𐝀	𐝁	𐝂	𐝃	𐝄	𐝅	𐝆	𐝇	𐝈	𐝉	𐝊	𐝋	𐝌	𐝍	𐝎	𐝏
U+1075x	𐝐	𐝑	𐝒	𐝓	𐝔	𐝕										
U+1076x	𐝠	𐝡	𐝢	𐝣	𐝤	𐝥	𐝦	𐝧								
U+1077x																
Notes: 1. As of Unicode version 16.0; 2. Grey areas indicate non-assigned code points

== History ==
The following Unicode-related documents record the purpose and process of defining specific characters in the Linear A block:

Version	Final code points (Note: Proposed code points and characters names may differ from final code points and names)	Count	L2 ID	WG2 ID	Document
7.0	U+10600..10736, 10740..10755, 10760..10767	341	L2/97-105	N1575	Jenkins, John H. (1997-05-21), Overview of the Aegean scripts
7.0	U+10600..10736, 10740..10755, 10760..10767	341	L2/97-288	N1603	Umamaheswaran, V. S. (1997-10-24), "8.24.1", Unconfirmed Meeting Minutes, WG 2 Meeting # 33, Heraklion, Crete, Greece, 20 June – 4 July 1997
7.0	U+10600..10736, 10740..10755, 10760..10767	341	L2/00-128		Bunz, Carl-Martin (2000-03-01), Scripts from the Past in Future Versions of Unicode
7.0	U+10600..10736, 10740..10755, 10760..10767	341	L2/00-153		Bunz, Carl-Martin (2000-04-26), Further comments on historic scripts
7.0	U+10600..10736, 10740..10755, 10760..10767	341	L2/10-004	N3755	Everson, Michael (2010-01-22), Preliminary proposal for encoding the Linear A script in the SMP of the UCS
7.0	U+10600..10736, 10740..10755, 10760..10767	341	L2/10-108		Moore, Lisa (2010-05-19), "C.18", UTC #123 / L2 #220 Minutes
7.0	U+10600..10736, 10740..10755, 10760..10767	341	L2/10-273	N3872	Everson, Michael (2010-07-30), Proposal to encode an additional Linear A character in the UCS
7.0	U+10600..10736, 10740..10755, 10760..10767	341	L2/10-171R2	N3774R2	Everson, Michael; Younger, John (2010-07-31), Proposal for encoding the Linear A script in the SMP of the UCS
7.0	U+10600..10736, 10740..10755, 10760..10767	341	L2/10-221		Moore, Lisa (2010-08-23), "C.22", UTC #124 / L2 #221 Minutes
7.0	U+10600..10736, 10740..10755, 10760..10767	341	L2/10-422	N3973	Everson, Michael (2010-12-28), Revised proposal for encoding the Linear A script in the SMP of the UCS
7.0	U+10600..10736, 10740..10755, 10760..10767	341	L2/11-016		Moore, Lisa (2011-02-15), "C.10", UTC #126 / L2 #223 Minutes
7.0	U+10600..10736, 10740..10755, 10760..10767	341		N4103	"11.2.11 Linear A script", Unconfirmed minutes of WG 2 meeting 58, 2012-01-03
