= Toto (Unicode block) =

- Range: U+1E290..U+1E2BF (48 code points)
- Plane: SMP
- Scripts: Toto
- Assigned: 31 code points
- Unused: 17 reserved code points

Unicode version history
- 14.0 (2021): 31 (+31)

Unicode documentation
- Code chart ∣ Web page

Toto is a Unicode block containing characters for Dhaniram Toto's script for writing the Toto language of in northeast India.

Toto^{[1]}^{[2]} Official Unicode Consortium code chart (PDF)
| | 0 | 1 | 2 | 3 | 4 | 5 | 6 | 7 | 8 | 9 | A | B | C | D | E | F |
| U+1E29x | 𞊐 | 𞊑 | 𞊒 | 𞊓 | 𞊔 | 𞊕 | 𞊖 | 𞊗 | 𞊘 | 𞊙 | 𞊚 | 𞊛 | 𞊜 | 𞊝 | 𞊞 | 𞊟 |
| U+1E2Ax | 𞊠 | 𞊡 | 𞊢 | 𞊣 | 𞊤 | 𞊥 | 𞊦 | 𞊧 | 𞊨 | 𞊩 | 𞊪 | 𞊫 | 𞊬 | 𞊭 | 𞊮 | |
| U+1E2Bx | | | | | | | | | | | | | | | | |
Notes: 1. As of Unicode version 16.0; 2. Grey areas indicate non-assigned code points

== History ==
The following Unicode-related documents record the purpose and process of defining specific characters in the Toto block:

| Version | Final code points (Note: Proposed code points and characters names may differ from final code points and names) | Count | L2 ID | WG2 ID | Document |
|---|---|---|---|---|---|
| 14.0 | U+1E290..1E2AE | 31 | L2/19-278 | | Anderson, Deborah (2019-07-17), Introducing the Toto script |
| 14.0 | U+1E290..1E2AE | 31 | L2/19-286 | | Anderson, Deborah; Whistler, Ken; Pournader, Roozbeh; Moore, Lisa; Liang, Hai (2019-07-22), "10. Toto", Recommendations to UTC #160 July 2019 on Script Proposals |
| 14.0 | U+1E290..1E2AE | 31 | L2/19-330 | N5141 | Anderson, Deborah (2019-09-27), Proposal for encoding the Toto script |
| 14.0 | U+1E290..1E2AE | 31 | L2/19-343 | | Anderson, Deborah; Whistler, Ken; Pournader, Roozbeh; Moore, Lisa; Liang, Hai (2019-10-06), "14. Toto", Recommendations to UTC #161 October 2019 on Script Proposals |
| 14.0 | U+1E290..1E2AE | 31 | L2/19-323 | | Moore, Lisa (2019-10-01), "C.9", UTC #161 Minutes |
