= Old Uyghur (Unicode block) =

- Range: U+10F70..U+10FAF (64 code points)
- Plane: SMP
- Scripts: Old Uyghur
- Assigned: 26 code points
- Unused: 38 reserved code points

Unicode version history
- 14.0 (2021): 26 (+26)

Unicode documentation
- Code chart ∣ Web page

Old Uyghur is a Unicode block containing characters of the Old Uyghur alphabet.

Old Uyghur^{[1]}^{[2]} Official Unicode Consortium code chart (PDF)
| | 0 | 1 | 2 | 3 | 4 | 5 | 6 | 7 | 8 | 9 | A | B | C | D | E | F |
| U+10F7x | 𐽰 | 𐽱 | 𐽲 | 𐽳 | 𐽴 | 𐽵 | 𐽶 | 𐽷 | 𐽸 | 𐽹 | 𐽺 | 𐽻 | 𐽼 | 𐽽 | 𐽾 | 𐽿 |
| U+10F8x | 𐾀 | 𐾁 | 𐾂 | 𐾃 | 𐾄 | 𐾅 | 𐾆 | 𐾇 | 𐾈 | 𐾉 | | | | | | |
| U+10F9x | | | | | | | | | | | | | | | | |
| U+10FAx | | | | | | | | | | | | | | | | |
Notes: 1. As of Unicode version 17.0; 2. Grey areas indicate non-assigned code points

== History ==
The following Unicode-related documents record the purpose and process of defining specific characters in the Old Uyghur block:

| Version | Final code points (Note: Proposed code points and characters names may differ from final code points and names) | Count | L2 ID | WG2 ID | Document |
|---|---|---|---|---|---|
| 14.0 | U+10F70..10F89 | 26 | L2/00-128 | | Bunz, Carl-Martin (2000-03-01), Scripts from the Past in Future Versions of Unicode |
| 14.0 | U+10F70..10F89 | 26 | L2/12-066 | N4226 | Osman, Omarjan (2011-11-07), Proposal for encoding the Uygur script in the SMP |
| 14.0 | U+10F70..10F89 | 26 | L2/13-028 | | Anderson, Deborah; McGowan, Rick; Whistler, Ken; Pournader, Roozbeh (2013-01-28), "3. L2/12-066", Recommendations to UTC on Script Proposals |
| 14.0 | U+10F70..10F89 | 26 | L2/13-071 | | Osman, Omarjan (2013-03-27), Proposal to Encode the Uyghur Script |
| 14.0 | U+10F70..10F89 | 26 | L2/13-086 | | Anderson, Deborah; McGowan, Rick; Whistler, Ken; Pournader, Roozbeh (2013-04-26), "16. L2/13-071", Recommendations to UTC on Script Proposals |
| 14.0 | U+10F70..10F89 | 26 | L2/18-168 | | Anderson, Deborah; Whistler, Ken; Pournader, Roozbeh; Moore, Lisa; Liang, Hai; Chapman, Chris; Cook, Richard (2018-04-28), "16. Old Uighur", Recommendations to UTC #155 April-May 2018 on Script Proposals |
| 14.0 | U+10F70..10F89 | 26 | L2/18-126 | | Pandey, Anshuman (2018-04-30), Preliminary proposal to encode Old Uyghur |
| 14.0 | U+10F70..10F89 | 26 | L2/18-335 | | Matsui, Dai (2018-05-02), Comments on the preliminary proposal to encode Old Uyghur in Unicode (L2/18-126) |
| 14.0 | U+10F70..10F89 | 26 | L2/18-333 | | Pandey, Anshuman (2018-11-30), Proposal to encode Old Uyghur in Unicode |
| 14.0 | U+10F70..10F89 | 26 | L2/19-016 | | Pandey, Anshuman (2019-01-07), Revised proposal to encode Old Uyghur |
| 14.0 | U+10F70..10F89 | 26 | L2/19-047 | | Anderson, Deborah; et al. (2019-01-13), "10. Old Uyghur", Recommendations to UTC #158 January 2019 on Script Proposals |
| 14.0 | U+10F70..10F89 | 26 | L2/20-046 | | Anderson, Deborah; Whistler, Ken; Pournader, Roozbeh; Moore, Lisa; Liang, Hai (2020-01-10), "9. Old Uyghur", Recommendations to UTC #162 January 2020 on Script Proposals |
| 14.0 | U+10F70..10F89 | 26 | L2/20-003R | | Pandey, Anshuman (2020-02-16), Revised proposal to encode Old Uyghur |
| 14.0 | U+10F70..10F89 | 26 | L2/20-169 | | Anderson, Deborah; Whistler, Ken; Pournader, Roozbeh; Moore, Lisa; Constable, Peter; Liang, Hai (2020-07-21), "14. Old Uyghur", Recommendations to UTC #164 July 2020 on Script Proposals |
| 14.0 | U+10F70..10F89 | 26 | L2/20-199 | | Kontovas, Nicholas (2020-07-29), Endorsement of the Old Uyghur encoding proposal L2/20-191 |
| 14.0 | U+10F70..10F89 | 26 | L2/20-250 | | Anderson, Deborah; Whistler, Ken; Pournader, Roozbeh; Moore, Lisa; Constable, Peter; Liang, Hai (2020-10-01), "12. Old Uyghur", Recommendations to UTC #165 October 2020 on Script Proposals |
| 14.0 | U+10F70..10F89 | 26 | L2/20-191 | N5153 | Pandey, Anshuman (2020-12-18), Final proposal to encode Old Uyghur |
| 14.0 | U+10F70..10F89 | 26 | L2/21-016R | | Anderson, Deborah; Whistler, Ken; Pournader, Roozbeh; Moore, Lisa; Liang, Hai (2021-01-14), "14 Old Uyghur", Recommendations to UTC #166 January 2021 on Script Proposals |
| 14.0 | U+10F70..10F89 | 26 | L2/21-009 | | Moore, Lisa (2021-01-27), "B.1 — 14", UTC #166 Minutes |
