= Nandinagari (Unicode block) =

- Range: U+119A0..U+119FF (96 code points)
- Plane: SMP
- Scripts: Nandinagari
- Assigned: 65 code points
- Unused: 31 reserved code points

Unicode version history
- 12.0 (2019): 65 (+65)

Unicode documentation
- Code chart ∣ Web page

Nandinagari is a Unicode block containing characters for Nandinagari script, historically used to write Sanskrit in southern India.

Nandinagari^{[1]}^{[2]} Official Unicode Consortium code chart (PDF)
	0	1	2	3	4	5	6	7	8	9	A	B	C	D	E	F
U+119Ax	𑦠	𑦡	𑦢	𑦣	𑦤	𑦥	𑦦	𑦧			𑦪	𑦫	𑦬	𑦭	𑦮	𑦯
U+119Bx	𑦰	𑦱	𑦲	𑦳	𑦴	𑦵	𑦶	𑦷	𑦸	𑦹	𑦺	𑦻	𑦼	𑦽	𑦾	𑦿
U+119Cx	𑧀	𑧁	𑧂	𑧃	𑧄	𑧅	𑧆	𑧇	𑧈	𑧉	𑧊	𑧋	𑧌	𑧍	𑧎	𑧏
U+119Dx	𑧐	𑧑	𑧒	𑧓	𑧔	𑧕	𑧖	𑧗			𑧚	𑧛	𑧜	𑧝	𑧞	𑧟
U+119Ex	𑧠	𑧡	𑧢	𑧣	𑧤											
U+119Fx																
Notes: 1. As of Unicode version 16.0; 2. Grey areas indicate non-assigned code points

== History ==
The following Unicode-related documents record the purpose and process of defining specific characters in the Nandinagari block:

Version	Final code points (Note: Proposed code points and characters names may differ from final code points and names)	Count	L2 ID	WG2 ID	Document
12.0	U+119A0..119A7, 119AA..119D7, 119DA..119E4	65	L2/13-002	N4389	Pandey, Anshuman (2013-01-14), Preliminary proposal for encoding the Nandinagari script
12.0	U+119A0..119A7, 119AA..119D7, 119DA..119E4	65	L2/13-028		Anderson, Deborah; McGowan, Rick; Whistler, Ken; Pournader, Roozbeh (2013-01-28), "28", Recommendations to UTC on Script Proposals
12.0	U+119A0..119A7, 119AA..119D7, 119DA..119E4	65		N4403 (pdf, doc)	Umamaheswaran, V. S. (2014-01-28), "10.2.2 Nandinagari script", Unconfirmed minutes of WG 2 meeting 61, Holiday Inn, Vilnius, Lithuania; 2013-06-10/14
12.0	U+119A0..119A7, 119AA..119D7, 119DA..119E4	65	L2/16-002		Pandey, Anshuman (2016-01-01), Proposal to encode the Nandinagari script
12.0	U+119A0..119A7, 119AA..119D7, 119DA..119E4	65	L2/16-037		Anderson, Deborah; Whistler, Ken; McGowan, Rick; Pournader, Roozbeh; Glass, Andrew; Iancu, Laurențiu (2016-01-22), "3. Nandinagari", Recommendations to UTC #146 January 2016 on Script Proposals
12.0	U+119A0..119A7, 119AA..119D7, 119DA..119E4	65	L2/16-004		Moore, Lisa (2016-02-01), "D.12", UTC #146 Minutes
12.0	U+119A0..119A7, 119AA..119D7, 119DA..119E4	65	L2/16-057		Sharma, Shriramana (2016-02-18), Comments on L2/16-002 Proposal to encode Nandinagari
12.0	U+119A0..119A7, 119AA..119D7, 119DA..119E4	65	L2/16-216		Anderson, Deborah; Whistler, Ken; McGowan, Rick; Pournader, Roozbeh; Glass, Andrew; Iancu, Laurențiu; Moore, Lisa (2016-07-30), "10. Nandinagari", Recommendations to UTC #148 August 2016 on Script Proposals
12.0	U+119A0..119A7, 119AA..119D7, 119DA..119E4	65	L2/16-310		Pandey, Anshuman (2016-10-20), Revised proposal to encode Nandinagari
12.0	U+119A0..119A7, 119AA..119D7, 119DA..119E4	65	L2/17-037		Anderson, Deborah; Whistler, Ken; Pournader, Roozbeh; Glass, Andrew; Iancu, Laurențiu; Moore, Lisa; Liang, Hai; Ishida, Richard; Misra, Karan; McGowan, Rick (2017-01-21), "6. Nandinagari", Recommendations to UTC #150 January 2017 on Script Proposals
12.0	U+119A0..119A7, 119AA..119D7, 119DA..119E4	65	L2/17-119		Pandey, Anshuman (2017-04-25), Towards an encoding model for Nandinagari conjuncts
12.0	U+119A0..119A7, 119AA..119D7, 119DA..119E4	65	L2/17-162	N4819	Pandey, Anshuman (2017-05-05), Final proposal to encode Nandinagari in Unicode
12.0	U+119A0..119A7, 119AA..119D7, 119DA..119E4	65	L2/17-153		Anderson, Deborah (2017-05-17), "6. Nandinagari", Recommendations to UTC #151 May 2017 on Script Proposals
12.0	U+119A0..119A7, 119AA..119D7, 119DA..119E4	65	L2/17-103		Moore, Lisa (2017-05-18), "D.10.2", UTC #151 Minutes
12.0	U+119A0..119A7, 119AA..119D7, 119DA..119E4	65	L2/17-213R	N4928	A, Srinidhi; A, Sridatta (2017-10-13), Proposal to encode the Prishthamatra for Nandinagari (revised)
12.0	U+119A0..119A7, 119AA..119D7, 119DA..119E4	65	L2/17-255		Anderson, Deborah; Whistler, Ken; Pournader, Roozbeh; Moore, Lisa; Liang, Hai (2017-07-28), "10. Nandinagari", Recommendations to UTC #152 July-August 2017 on Script Proposals
12.0	U+119A0..119A7, 119AA..119D7, 119DA..119E4	65	L2/18-039		Anderson, Deborah; Whistler, Ken; Pournader, Roozbeh; Moore, Lisa; Liang, Hai; Cook, Richard (2018-01-19), "15. Nandinagari", Recommendations to UTC #154 January 2018 on Script Proposals
12.0	U+119A0..119A7, 119AA..119D7, 119DA..119E4	65	L2/18-007		Moore, Lisa (2018-03-19), "D.5.1", UTC #154 Minutes
12.0	U+119A0..119A7, 119AA..119D7, 119DA..119E4	65	L2/18-183		Moore, Lisa (2018-11-20), "Consensus 156-C10", UTC #156 Minutes
12.0	U+119A0..119A7, 119AA..119D7, 119DA..119E4	65	L2/19-050		Liang, Hai (2019-01-09), Reconsidering gc and InPC values of U+119D2 nandinagari vowel sign i
12.0	U+119A0..119A7, 119AA..119D7, 119DA..119E4	65	L2/19-047		Anderson, Deborah; et al. (2019-01-13), "9", Recommendations to UTC #158 January 2019 on Script Proposals
