= Kanbun (Unicode block) =

- Range: U+3190..U+319F (16 code points)
- Plane: BMP
- Scripts: Common
- Major alphabets: Chinese characters
- Assigned: 16 code points
- Unused: 0 reserved code points

Unicode version history
- 1.0.0 (1991): 16 (+16)

Unicode documentation
- Code chart ∣ Web page

Kanbun is a Unicode block containing annotation characters used in Japanese copies (kanbun) of Classical Chinese texts, to indicate reading order.

Its block name in Unicode 1.0 was CJK Miscellaneous, and its code point range was defined differently, including the then-unallocated space now occupied by Bopomofo Extended, CJK Strokes and Katakana Phonetic Extensions.

Kanbun^{[1]} Official Unicode Consortium code chart (PDF)
	0	1	2	3	4	5	6	7	8	9	A	B	C	D	E	F
U+319x	㆐	㆑	㆒	㆓	㆔	㆕	㆖	㆗	㆘	㆙	㆚	㆛	㆜	㆝	㆞	㆟
Notes: 1. As of Unicode version 16.0

== History ==
The following Unicode-related document records the purpose and process of defining specific characters in the Kanbun block:

Version	Final code points (Note: Proposed code points and characters names may differ from final code points and names)	Count	UTC ID	Document
1.0.0	U+3190..319F	16	UTC/1991-048B	Whistler, Ken (1991-03-27), "Kaeriten from U+3190 to U+319f", Draft Minutes from the UTC meeting #46 day 2, 3/27 at Apple
