= Devanagari Extended-A =

- Range: U+11B00..U+11B5F (96 code points)
- Plane: SMP
- Scripts: Devanagari
- Assigned: 11 code points
- Unused: 85 reserved code points

Unicode Version History
- 15.0 (2022): 10 (+10)
- 18.0 (2026): 11 (+1)

Unicode documentation
- Code chart ∣ Web page

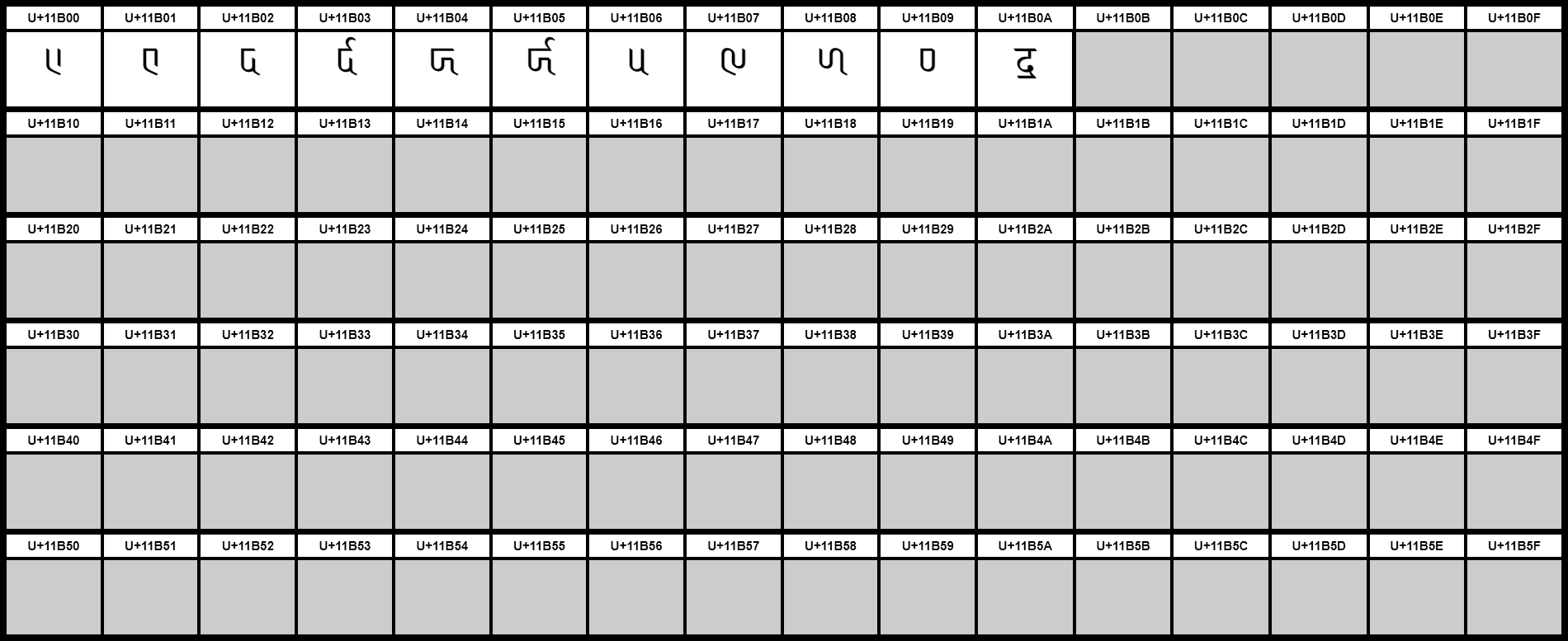
Graphical representation of the Devanagari Extended-A Unicode block

Devanagari Extended-A is a Unicode block containing characters for auspicious signs from Indian inscriptions and manuscripts from the 11th century onward.

== Block ==
Devanagari Extended-A^{[1]}^{[2]} Official Unicode Consortium code chart (PDF)
	0	1	2	3	4	5	6	7	8	9	A	B	C	D	E	F
U+11B0x	𑬀	𑬁	𑬂	𑬃	𑬄	𑬅	𑬆	𑬇	𑬈	𑬉	𑬊					
U+11B1x																
U+11B2x																
U+11B3x																
U+11B4x																
U+11B5x																
Notes 1.As of Unicode version 18.0 2.Grey areas indicate non-assigned code points

== History ==
The following Unicode-related documents record the purpose and process of defining specific characters in the Devanagari Extended-A block:

Version	Final code points (Note: Proposed code points and characters names may differ from final code points and names)	Count	L2 ID	Document
15.0	U+11B00..11B09	10	L2/21-102	Pandey, Anshuman (2021-05-21), Proposal for representing the Devanagari 'bhale mīṇḍu'
15.0	U+11B00..11B09	10	L2/21-130	Anderson, Deborah; Whistler, Ken; Pournader, Roozbeh; Liang, Hai (2021-07-26), "7b", Recommendations to UTC #168 July 2021 on Script Proposals
15.0	U+11B00..11B09	10	L2/21-123	Cummings, Craig (2021-08-03), "Consensus 168-C23", Draft Minutes of UTC Meeting 168
15.0	U+11B00..11B09	10	L2/21-174	Anderson, Deborah; Whistler, Ken; Pournader, Roozbeh; Liang, Hai (2021-10-01), "7. Devanagari", Recommendations to UTC #169 October 2021 on Script Proposals
15.0	U+11B00..11B09	10	L2/21-167	Cummings, Craig (2022-01-27), "Consensus 169-C3", Approved Minutes of UTC Meeting 169
18.0	U+11B0A	1	L2/25-022	Mandal, Biswajit (2024-12-12), Proposal to encode the Devanagari letter Sindhi DDDA in Unicode
18.0	U+11B0A	1	L2/25-010	Kučera, Jan; et al. (2025-01-16), "1.3 Devanagari letter Sindhi DDDA", Recommendations to UTC #182 (January 2025) on Script Proposals
18.0	U+11B0A	1	L2/25-003	Leroy, Robin (2025-01-28), "Consensus 182-C5", UTC #182 Minutes, "Provisionally assign one code point U+11B0A DEVANAGARI LETTER ALTERNATE DDDA ..."
18.0	U+11B0A	1	L2/25-226	"Consensus 185-C40", UTC #185 Minutes, 2025-10-29, "UTC accepts for encoding in Unicode 18.0 ..."
