= Dives Akuru (Unicode block) =

- Range: U+11900..U+1195F (96 code points)
- Plane: SMP
- Scripts: Dives Akuru
- Assigned: 72 code points
- Unused: 24 reserved code points

Unicode version history
- 13.0 (2020): 72 (+72)

Unicode documentation
- Code chart ∣ Web page

Dives Akuru is a Unicode block containing characters from the Dhives Akuru script, which was used for writing the Maldivian language up until the 20th century.

== Block ==
Dives Akuru^{[1]}^{[2]} Official Unicode Consortium code chart (PDF)
	0	1	2	3	4	5	6	7	8	9	A	B	C	D	E	F
U+1190x	𑤀	𑤁	𑤂	𑤃	𑤄	𑤅	𑤆			𑤉			𑤌	𑤍	𑤎	𑤏
U+1191x	𑤐	𑤑	𑤒	𑤓		𑤕	𑤖		𑤘	𑤙	𑤚	𑤛	𑤜	𑤝	𑤞	𑤟
U+1192x	𑤠	𑤡	𑤢	𑤣	𑤤	𑤥	𑤦	𑤧	𑤨	𑤩	𑤪	𑤫	𑤬	𑤭	𑤮	𑤯
U+1193x	𑤰	𑤱	𑤲	𑤳	𑤴	𑤵		𑤷	𑤸			𑤻	𑤼	𑤽	𑤾	𑤿
U+1194x	𑥀	𑥁	𑥂	𑥃	𑥄	𑥅	𑥆									
U+1195x	𑥐	𑥑	𑥒	𑥓	𑥔	𑥕	𑥖	𑥗	𑥘	𑥙						
Notes: 1. As of Unicode version 17.0; 2. Grey areas indicate non-assigned code points

== History ==
The following Unicode-related documents record the purpose and process of defining specific characters in the Dives Akuru block:

Version	Final code points (Note: Proposed code points and characters names may differ from final code points and names)	Count	L2 ID	WG2 ID	Document
13.0	U+11900..11906, 11909, 1190C..11913, 11915..11916, 11918..11935, 11937..11938, 1193B..11946, 11950..11959	72	L2/09-191		Pandey, Anshuman (2009-05-02), Preliminary Proposal to Encode the Dhivehi Script in ISO/IEC 10646
13.0	U+11900..11906, 11909, 1190C..11913, 11915..11916, 11918..11935, 11937..11938, 1193B..11946, 11950..11959	72	L2/10-213	N3848	Pandey, Anshuman (2010-06-30), Preliminary Proposal to Encode Dhives Akuru in ISO/IEC 10646
13.0	U+11900..11906, 11909, 1190C..11913, 11915..11916, 11918..11935, 11937..11938, 1193B..11946, 11950..11959	72	L2/17-292		Pandey, Anshuman (2017-10-06), Proposal to encode Divehi in Unicode
13.0	U+11900..11906, 11909, 1190C..11913, 11915..11916, 11918..11935, 11937..11938, 1193B..11946, 11950..11959	72	L2/17-384		Anderson, Deborah; Whistler, Ken; Pournader, Roozbeh; Moore, Lisa; Liang, Hai (2017-10-22), "8. Divehi (Dhives Akuru)", Recommendations to UTC #153 October 2017 on Script Proposals
13.0	U+11900..11906, 11909, 1190C..11913, 11915..11916, 11918..11935, 11937..11938, 1193B..11946, 11950..11959	72	L2/17-417R		Pandey, Anshuman (2017-12-31), Proposal to encode Dives Akuru in Unicode
13.0	U+11900..11906, 11909, 1190C..11913, 11915..11916, 11918..11935, 11937..11938, 1193B..11946, 11950..11959	72	L2/18-016R	N4929	Pandey, Anshuman (2018-01-23), Proposal to encode Dives Akuru in Unicode
13.0	U+11900..11906, 11909, 1190C..11913, 11915..11916, 11918..11935, 11937..11938, 1193B..11946, 11950..11959	72	L2/18-039		Anderson, Deborah; Whistler, Ken; Pournader, Roozbeh; Moore, Lisa; Liang, Hai; Cook, Richard (2018-01-19), "10", Recommendations to UTC #154 January 2018 on Script Proposals
13.0	U+11900..11906, 11909, 1190C..11913, 11915..11916, 11918..11935, 11937..11938, 1193B..11946, 11950..11959	72	L2/18-007		Moore, Lisa (2018-03-19), "D.7", UTC #154 Minutes
13.0	U+11900..11906, 11909, 1190C..11913, 11915..11916, 11918..11935, 11937..11938, 1193B..11946, 11950..11959	72		N5020 (pdf, doc)	Umamaheswaran, V. S. (2019-01-11), "10.2.1 Dives Akuru script", Unconfirmed minutes of WG 2 meeting 67
