= Cypro-Minoan (Unicode block) =

- Range: U+12F90..U+12FFF (112 code points)
- Plane: SMP
- Scripts: Cypro Minoan
- Assigned: 99 code points
- Unused: 13 reserved code points

Unicode version history
- 14.0 (2021): 99 (+99)

Unicode documentation
- Code chart ∣ Web page

Cypro-Minoan is a Unicode block containing undeciphered characters used on the island of Cyprus during the late Bronze Age (c. 1550–1050 BC).

Cypro-Minoan^{[1]}^{[2]} Official Unicode Consortium code chart (PDF)
| | 0 | 1 | 2 | 3 | 4 | 5 | 6 | 7 | 8 | 9 | A | B | C | D | E | F |
| U+12F9x | 𒾐 | 𒾑 | 𒾒 | 𒾓 | 𒾔 | 𒾕 | 𒾖 | 𒾗 | 𒾘 | 𒾙 | 𒾚 | 𒾛 | 𒾜 | 𒾝 | 𒾞 | 𒾟 |
| U+12FAx | 𒾠 | 𒾡 | 𒾢 | 𒾣 | 𒾤 | 𒾥 | 𒾦 | 𒾧 | 𒾨 | 𒾩 | 𒾪 | 𒾫 | 𒾬 | 𒾭 | 𒾮 | 𒾯 |
| U+12FBx | 𒾰 | 𒾱 | 𒾲 | 𒾳 | 𒾴 | 𒾵 | 𒾶 | 𒾷 | 𒾸 | 𒾹 | 𒾺 | 𒾻 | 𒾼 | 𒾽 | 𒾾 | 𒾿 |
| U+12FCx | 𒿀 | 𒿁 | 𒿂 | 𒿃 | 𒿄 | 𒿅 | 𒿆 | 𒿇 | 𒿈 | 𒿉 | 𒿊 | 𒿋 | 𒿌 | 𒿍 | 𒿎 | 𒿏 |
| U+12FDx | 𒿐 | 𒿑 | 𒿒 | 𒿓 | 𒿔 | 𒿕 | 𒿖 | 𒿗 | 𒿘 | 𒿙 | 𒿚 | 𒿛 | 𒿜 | 𒿝 | 𒿞 | 𒿟 |
| U+12FEx | 𒿠 | 𒿡 | 𒿢 | 𒿣 | 𒿤 | 𒿥 | 𒿦 | 𒿧 | 𒿨 | 𒿩 | 𒿪 | 𒿫 | 𒿬 | 𒿭 | 𒿮 | 𒿯 |
| U+12FFx | 𒿰 | 𒿱 | 𒿲 | | | | | | | | | | | | | |
Notes: 1. As of Unicode version 16.0; 2. Grey areas indicate non-assigned code points

== History ==
The following Unicode-related documents record the purpose and process of defining specific characters in the Cypro-Minoan block:

| Version | Final code points (Note: Proposed code points and characters names may differ from final code points and names) | Count | L2 ID | WG2 ID | Document |
|---|---|---|---|---|---|
| 14.0 | U+12F90..12FF2 | 99 | L2/16-089 | N4715 | Everson, Michael (2012-04-25), Proposal to encode the Cypro-Minoan script in the SMP |
| 14.0 | U+12F90..12FF2 | 99 | L2/16-179 | N4733 | Everson, Michael (2012-07-22), Revised proposal to encode the Cypro-Minoan script in the SMP |
| 14.0 | U+12F90..12FF2 | 99 | L2/16-216 | | Anderson, Deborah; Whistler, Ken; McGowan, Rick; Pournader, Roozbeh; Glass, Andrew; Iancu, Laurențiu; Moore, Lisa (2016-07-30), "2. Cypro-Minoan", Recommendations to UTC #148 August 2016 on Script Proposals |
| 14.0 | U+12F90..12FF2 | 99 | L2/16-203 | | Moore, Lisa (2016-08-18), "C.5", UTC #148 Minutes |
| 14.0 | U+12F90..12FF2 | 99 | L2/16-265 | N4762 | Anderson, Deborah (2016-09-26), Feedback on Cypro-Minoan (based on Script Ad Hoc comments in L2/16-216) |
| 14.0 | U+12F90..12FF2 | 99 | | N4873R (pdf, doc) | "10.2.2", Unconfirmed minutes of WG 2 meeting 65, 2018-03-16 |
| 14.0 | U+12F90..12FF2 | 99 | | N4953 (pdf, doc) | "9.2.6", Unconfirmed minutes of WG 2 meeting 66, 2018-03-23 |
| 14.0 | U+12F90..12FF2 | 99 | L2/18-241 | | Anderson, Deborah; et al. (2018-07-20), "2. Cypro-Minoan", Recommendations to UTC # 156 July 2018 on Script Proposals |
| 14.0 | U+12F90..12FF2 | 99 | | N5020 (pdf, doc) | Umamaheswaran, V. S. (2019-01-11), "10.2.5", Unconfirmed minutes of WG 2 meeting 67 |
| 14.0 | U+12F90..12FF2 | 99 | L2/19-166 | | Anderson, Deborah (2019-03-15), Brief Report from meeting on Cypro-Minoan, Paris, March 2019 |
| 14.0 | U+12F90..12FF2 | 99 | L2/19-173 | | Anderson, Deborah; et al. (2019-04-29), "2. Cypro-Minoan", Recommendations to UTC #159 April-May 2019 on Script Proposals |
| 14.0 | U+12F90..12FF2 | 99 | L2/20-154 | N5135 | Everson, Michael (2020-07-14), Final proposal to encode the Cypro-Minoan script in the SMP |
| 14.0 | U+12F90..12FF2 | 99 | L2/20-169 | | Anderson, Deborah; Whistler, Ken; Pournader, Roozbeh; Moore, Lisa; Constable, Peter; Liang, Hai (2020-07-21), "2a. Cypro-Minoan Script", Recommendations to UTC #164 July 2020 on Script Proposals |
| 14.0 | U+12F90..12FF2 | 99 | L2/20-172 | | Moore, Lisa (2020-08-03), "B.1", UTC #164 Minutes |
| 14.0 | U+12F90..12FF2 | 99 | L2/20-237 | | Moore, Lisa (2020-10-27), "Consensus 165-C16", UTC #165 Minutes |
| 14.0 | U+12F90..12FF2 | 99 | L2/20-156R | N5137R2 | Everson, Michael (2020-12-31), Considerations regarding a normalized Cypro-Minoan reference font |
| 14.0 | U+12F90..12FF2 | 99 | L2/21-016R | | Anderson, Deborah; Whistler, Ken; Pournader, Roozbeh; Moore, Lisa; Liang, Hai (2021-01-14), "2 Cypro-Minoan", Recommendations to UTC #166 January 2021 on Script Proposals |
| 14.0 | U+12F90..12FF2 | 99 | L2/21-009 | | Moore, Lisa (2021-01-27), "B.1 — 2 Cypro-Minoan", UTC #166 Minutes |
