= Tai Yo (Unicode block) =

- Range: U+1E6C0..U+1E6FF (64 code points)
- Plane: SMP
- Scripts: Tai Yo
- Assigned: 55 code points
- Unused: 9 reserved code points

Unicode version history
- 17.0 (2025): 55 (+55)

Unicode documentation
- Code chart ∣ Web page

Tai Yo is a Unicode block for Lai Tay script, previously used to write the Tai Yo language in Vietnam.

== Block ==
Tai Yo^{[1]}^{[2]} Official Unicode Consortium code chart (PDF)
| | 0 | 1 | 2 | 3 | 4 | 5 | 6 | 7 | 8 | 9 | A | B | C | D | E | F |
| U+1E6Cx | 𞛀 | 𞛁 | 𞛂 | 𞛃 | 𞛄 | 𞛅 | 𞛆 | 𞛇 | 𞛈 | 𞛉 | 𞛊 | 𞛋 | 𞛌 | 𞛍 | 𞛎 | 𞛏 |
| U+1E6Dx | 𞛐 | 𞛑 | 𞛒 | 𞛓 | 𞛔 | 𞛕 | 𞛖 | 𞛗 | 𞛘 | 𞛙 | 𞛚 | 𞛛 | 𞛜 | 𞛝 | 𞛞 | |
| U+1E6Ex | 𞛠 | 𞛡 | 𞛢 | 𞛣 | 𞛤 | 𞛥 | 𞛦 | 𞛧 | 𞛨 | 𞛩 | 𞛪 | 𞛫 | 𞛬 | 𞛭 | 𞛮 | 𞛯 |
| U+1E6Fx | 𞛰 | 𞛱 | 𞛲 | 𞛳 | 𞛴 | 𞛵 | | | | | | | | | 𞛾 | 𞛿 |
Notes: 1. As of Unicode version 17.0; 2. Grey areas indicate non-assigned code points

== History ==
The following Unicode-related documents record the purpose and process of defining specific characters in the Tai Yo block:

| Version | Final code points (Note: Proposed code points and characters names may differ from final code points and names) | Count | L2 ID | Document |
|---|---|---|---|---|
| 17.0 | U+1E6C0..1E6DE, 1E6E0..1E6F5, 1E6FE..1E6FF | 55 | L2/22-152 | Nguyen, Viet Khoi; Sam, Cong Danh; van de Kasteelen, Frank (2022-07-13), Preliminary Proposal to encode the Yo Lai Tay Script |
| 17.0 | U+1E6C0..1E6DE, 1E6E0..1E6F5, 1E6FE..1E6FF | 55 | L2/22-128 | Anderson, Deborah; Whistler, Ken; Pournader, Roozbeh; Constable, Peter (2022-07-20), "11 Yo Lai Tay", Recommendations to UTC #172 July 2022 on Script Proposals |
| 17.0 | U+1E6C0..1E6DE, 1E6E0..1E6F5, 1E6FE..1E6FF | 55 | L2/22-208 | Nguyen, Viet Khoi; Sam, Cong Danh; van de Kasteelen, Frank (2022-09-20), Final Proposal to encode the Yo Lai Tay Script |
| 17.0 | U+1E6C0..1E6DE, 1E6E0..1E6F5, 1E6FE..1E6FF | 55 | L2/22-248 | Anderson, Deborah; et al. (2022-10-31), "9 Yo Lai Tay", Recommendations to UTC #173 October 2022 on Script Proposals |
| 17.0 | U+1E6C0..1E6DE, 1E6E0..1E6F5, 1E6FE..1E6FF | 55 | L2/22-289R | Nguyen, Viet Khoi; Sam, Cong Danh; van de Kasteelen, Frank (2022-12-16), Final Proposal to encode the Tai Yo Script |
| 17.0 | U+1E6C0..1E6DE, 1E6E0..1E6F5, 1E6FE..1E6FF | 55 | L2/23-012 | Anderson, Deborah; et al. (2023-01-17), "8 Tai Yo", Recommendations to UTC #174 January 2023 on Script Proposals |
| 17.0 | U+1E6C0..1E6DE, 1E6E0..1E6F5, 1E6FE..1E6FF | 55 | L2/23-005 | Constable, Peter (2023-02-01), "Consensus 174-C23", UTC #174 Minutes |
| 17.0 | U+1E6C0..1E6DE, 1E6E0..1E6F5, 1E6FE..1E6FF | 55 | L2/23-159 | McGowan, Rick (2023-07-06), "ReportID: ID20230626215409", Comments on Public Review Issues (April 5 - July 4, 2023) |
| 17.0 | U+1E6C0..1E6DE, 1E6E0..1E6F5, 1E6FE..1E6FF | 55 | L2/23-164 | Anderson, Deborah; Kučera, Jan; Whistler, Ken; Pournader, Roozbeh; Constable, Peter (2023-07-21), "14 Tai Yo", Recommendations to UTC #176 July 2023 on Script Proposals |
| 17.0 | U+1E6C0..1E6DE, 1E6E0..1E6F5, 1E6FE..1E6FF | 55 | L2/23-157 | Constable, Peter (2023-07-31), "Consensus 176-C38", UTC #176 Minutes |
| 17.0 | U+1E6C0..1E6DE, 1E6E0..1E6F5, 1E6FE..1E6FF | 55 | L2/25-091R | Kučera, Jan; et al. (2025-04-22), "5.6 Tai Yo CCC", Recommendations to UTC #183 (April 2025) on Script Proposals |
| 17.0 | U+1E6C0..1E6DE, 1E6E0..1E6F5, 1E6FE..1E6FF | 55 | L2/25-085 | Leroy, Robin (2025-04-28), "F.1 1.7 Tai Yo signs", UTC #183 Minutes |
