= Linear B Ideograms =

- Range: U+10080..U+100FF (128 code points)
- Plane: SMP
- Scripts: Linear B
- Symbol sets: Linear B Greek
- Assigned: 123 code points
- Unused: 5 reserved code points

Unicode version history
- 4.0 (2003): 123 (+123)

Unicode documentation
- Code chart ∣ Web page

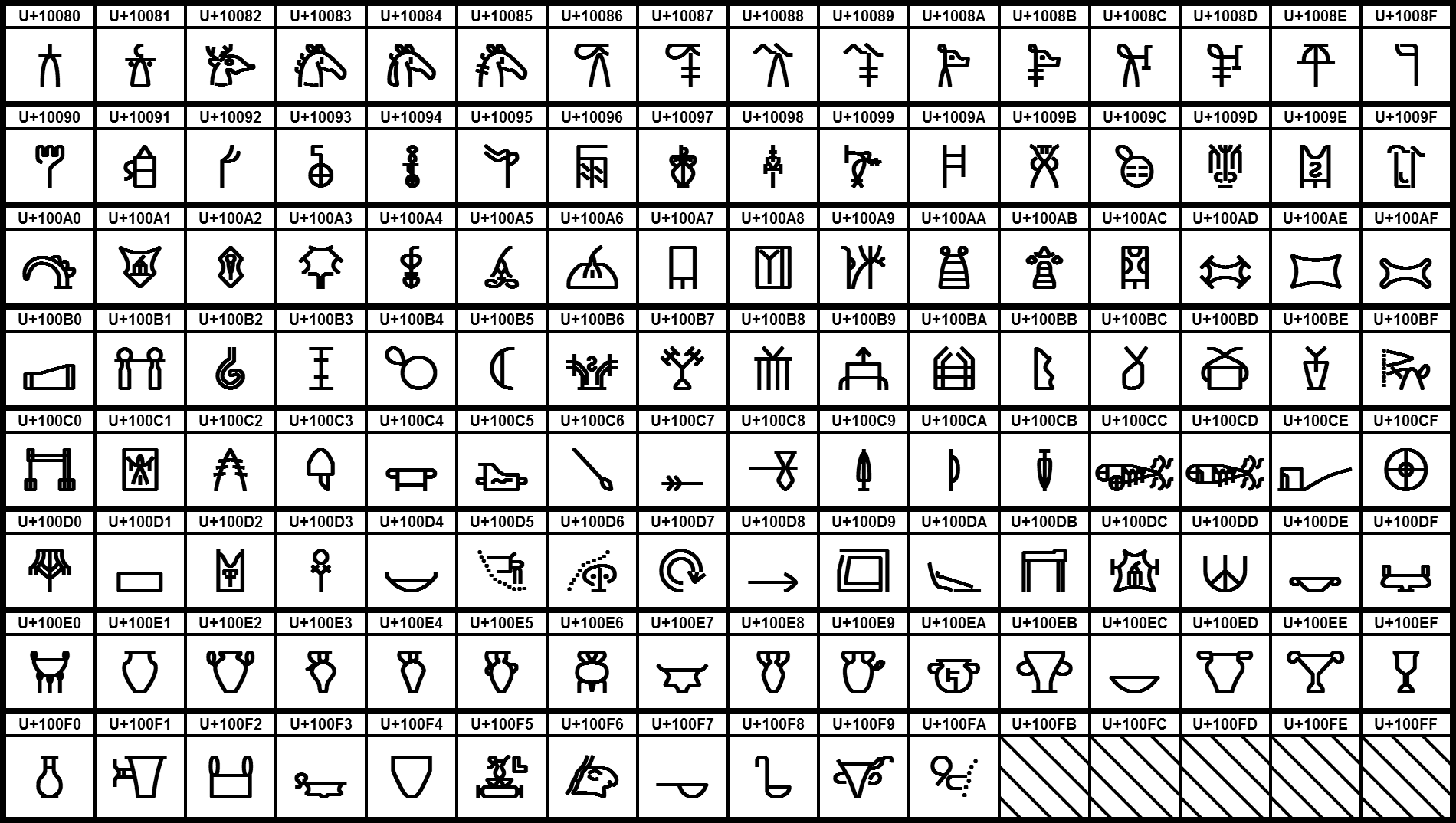
Graphical representation of the Linear B Ideograms Unicode block

Linear B Ideograms is a Unicode block containing ideographic characters for writing Mycenaean Greek and Minoan. Several Linear B ideographs double as syllabic letters, and are encoded in the Linear B Syllabary block.

== Block ==
Linear B Ideograms^{[1]}^{[2]} Official Unicode Consortium code chart (PDF)
	0	1	2	3	4	5	6	7	8	9	A	B	C	D	E	F
U+1008x	𐂀	𐂁	𐂂	𐂃	𐂄	𐂅	𐂆	𐂇	𐂈	𐂉	𐂊	𐂋	𐂌	𐂍	𐂎	𐂏
U+1009x	𐂐	𐂑	𐂒	𐂓	𐂔	𐂕	𐂖	𐂗	𐂘	𐂙	𐂚	𐂛	𐂜	𐂝	𐂞	𐂟
U+100Ax	𐂠	𐂡	𐂢	𐂣	𐂤	𐂥	𐂦	𐂧	𐂨	𐂩	𐂪	𐂫	𐂬	𐂭	𐂮	𐂯
U+100Bx	𐂰	𐂱	𐂲	𐂳	𐂴	𐂵	𐂶	𐂷	𐂸	𐂹	𐂺	𐂻	𐂼	𐂽	𐂾	𐂿
U+100Cx	𐃀	𐃁	𐃂	𐃃	𐃄	𐃅	𐃆	𐃇	𐃈	𐃉	𐃊	𐃋	𐃌	𐃍	𐃎	𐃏
U+100Dx	𐃐	𐃑	𐃒	𐃓	𐃔	𐃕	𐃖	𐃗	𐃘	𐃙	𐃚	𐃛	𐃜	𐃝	𐃞	𐃟
U+100Ex	𐃠	𐃡	𐃢	𐃣	𐃤	𐃥	𐃦	𐃧	𐃨	𐃩	𐃪	𐃫	𐃬	𐃭	𐃮	𐃯
U+100Fx	𐃰	𐃱	𐃲	𐃳	𐃴	𐃵	𐃶	𐃷	𐃸	𐃹	𐃺					
Notes: 1. As of Unicode version 16.0; 2. Grey areas indicate non-assigned code points

== History ==
The following Unicode-related documents record the purpose and process of defining specific characters in the Linear B Ideograms block:

Version	Final code points (Note: Proposed code points and characters names may differ from final code points and names)	Count	L2 ID	WG2 ID	Document
4.0	U+10080..100FA	123	L2/97-107		Jenkins, John H. (1997-05-27), Proposal to add the Linear B script to ISO/IEC 10646
4.0	U+10080..100FA	123	L2/00-128		Bunz, Carl-Martin (2000-03-01), Scripts from the Past in Future Versions of Unicode
4.0	U+10080..100FA	123	L2/01-084		Anderson, Deborah (2001-01-28), Status Report on Aegean Script Proposal (Linear B, Aegean Numbers and Cypriot Syllabary)
4.0	U+10080..100FA	123	L2/01-149	N2327	Anderson, Deborah; Everson, Michael (2001-04-03), Revised proposal to encode Aegean scripts in the UCS
4.0	U+10080..100FA	123	L2/01-217		Anderson, Deborah (2001-05-20), Status Report on Aegean Script Proposal (Linear B, Aegean Numbers and Cypriot Syllabary)
4.0	U+10080..100FA	123	L2/01-184R		Moore, Lisa (2001-06-18), "Motion 87-M4", Minutes from the UTC/L2 meeting
4.0	U+10080..100FA	123	L2/01-370	N2378	Anderson, Deborah; Everson, Michael (2001-10-03), Final proposal to encode Aegean scripts in the UCS
4.0	U+10080..100FA	123	L2/02-154	N2403	Umamaheswaran, V. S. (2002-04-22), "Resolution M41.8", Draft minutes of WG 2 meeting 41, Hotel Phoenix, Singapore, 2001-10-15/19
4.0	U+10080..100FA	123	L2/02-160		Anderson, Deborah (2002-04-27), Status Report on Aegean Script Proposal and the Submission by the Thesaurus Linguae Graecae (TLG)
4.0	U+10080..100FA	123	L2/02-191		Anderson, Deborah (2002-05-01), Aegean Script Proposal [notes]
4.0	U+10080..100FA	123	L2/02-207	N2455	Anderson, Deborah; McGowan, Rick (2002-05-09), Request for changes in Aegean Scripts
