= Small Form Variants =

- Range: U+FE50..U+FE6F (32 code points)
- Plane: BMP
- Scripts: Common
- Symbol sets: Small punctuation
- Assigned: 26 code points
- Unused: 6 reserved code points
- Source standards: CNS 11643

Unicode version history
- 1.0.0 (1991): 26 (+26)

Unicode documentation
- Code chart ∣ Web page

Small Form Variants is a Unicode block containing small punctuation characters for compatibility with the Chinese National Standard CNS 11643. Its block name in Unicode 1.0 was simply Small Variants.

Small Form Variants^{[1]}^{[2]} Official Unicode Consortium code chart (PDF)
	0	1	2	3	4	5	6	7	8	9	A	B	C	D	E	F
U+FE5x	﹐	﹑	﹒		﹔	﹕	﹖	﹗	﹘	﹙	﹚	﹛	﹜	﹝	﹞	﹟
U+FE6x	﹠	﹡	﹢	﹣	﹤	﹥	﹦		﹨	﹩	﹪	﹫				
Notes: 1. As of Unicode version 16.0; 2. Grey areas indicate non-assigned code points
