= Tangsa (Unicode block) =

- Range: U+16A70..U+16ACF (96 code points)
- Plane: SMP
- Scripts: Tangsa
- Assigned: 89 code points
- Unused: 7 reserved code points

Unicode version history
- 14.0 (2021): 89 (+89)

Unicode documentation
- Code chart ∣ Web page

Tangsa is a Unicode block containing characters of the alphabet designed by Mr. Lakhum Mossang for writing the Tangsa language of India and Myanmar.

Tangsa^{[1]}^{[2]} Official Unicode Consortium code chart (PDF)
	0	1	2	3	4	5	6	7	8	9	A	B	C	D	E	F
U+16A7x	𖩰	𖩱	𖩲	𖩳	𖩴	𖩵	𖩶	𖩷	𖩸	𖩹	𖩺	𖩻	𖩼	𖩽	𖩾	𖩿
U+16A8x	𖪀	𖪁	𖪂	𖪃	𖪄	𖪅	𖪆	𖪇	𖪈	𖪉	𖪊	𖪋	𖪌	𖪍	𖪎	𖪏
U+16A9x	𖪐	𖪑	𖪒	𖪓	𖪔	𖪕	𖪖	𖪗	𖪘	𖪙	𖪚	𖪛	𖪜	𖪝	𖪞	𖪟
U+16AAx	𖪠	𖪡	𖪢	𖪣	𖪤	𖪥	𖪦	𖪧	𖪨	𖪩	𖪪	𖪫	𖪬	𖪭	𖪮	𖪯
U+16ABx	𖪰	𖪱	𖪲	𖪳	𖪴	𖪵	𖪶	𖪷	𖪸	𖪹	𖪺	𖪻	𖪼	𖪽	𖪾	
U+16ACx	𖫀	𖫁	𖫂	𖫃	𖫄	𖫅	𖫆	𖫇	𖫈	𖫉						
Notes: 1. As of Unicode version 17.0; 2. Grey areas indicate non-assigned code points

== History ==
The following Unicode-related documents record the purpose and process of defining specific characters in the Tangsa block:

Version	Final code points (Note: Proposed code points and characters names may differ from final code points and names)	Count	L2 ID	WG2 ID	Document
14.0	U+16A70..16ABE, 16AC0..16AC9	89	L2/13-231	N4496	Pandey, Anshuman (2013-11-08), Introducing Lakhum Mossang's Script for Tangsa
14.0	U+16A70..16ABE, 16AC0..16AC9	89	L2/14-053		Anderson, Deborah; Whistler, Ken; McGowan, Rick; Pournader, Roozbeh; Iancu, Laurențiu (2014-01-26), "16. L2/13-231", Recommendations to UTC #138 February 2014 on Script Proposals
14.0	U+16A70..16ABE, 16AC0..16AC9	89	L2/20-124		Morey, Stephen (2020-04-08), Preliminary Proposal to add the Tangsa Script in the SMP
14.0	U+16A70..16ABE, 16AC0..16AC9	89	L2/20-105		Anderson, Deborah; Whistler, Ken; Pournader, Roozbeh; Moore, Lisa; Constable, Peter; Liang, Hai (2020-04-20), "8. Tangsa", Recommendations to UTC #163 April 2020 on Script Proposals
14.0	U+16A70..16ABE, 16AC0..16AC9	89	L2/20-259		Morey, Stephen (2020-08-24), Proposal to add the Tangsa Script in the SMP
14.0	U+16A70..16ABE, 16AC0..16AC9	89	L2/20-250		Anderson, Deborah; Whistler, Ken; Pournader, Roozbeh; Moore, Lisa; Constable, Peter; Liang, Hai (2020-10-01), "13. Tangsa", Recommendations to UTC #165 October 2020 on Script Proposals
14.0	U+16A70..16ABE, 16AC0..16AC9	89	L2/21-027R		Morey, Stephen (2021-01-29), Proposal to add the Tangsa Script in the SMP
14.0	U+16A70..16ABE, 16AC0..16AC9	89	L2/21-016R		Anderson, Deborah; Whistler, Ken; Pournader, Roozbeh; Moore, Lisa; Liang, Hai (2021-01-14), "15 Tangsa", Recommendations to UTC #166 January 2021 on Script Proposals
14.0	U+16A70..16ABE, 16AC0..16AC9	89	L2/21-009		Moore, Lisa (2021-01-27), "Consensus 166-C29", UTC #166 Minutes
