= Alphabets of Anatolia =

Alphabets in use in Iron Age Anatolia

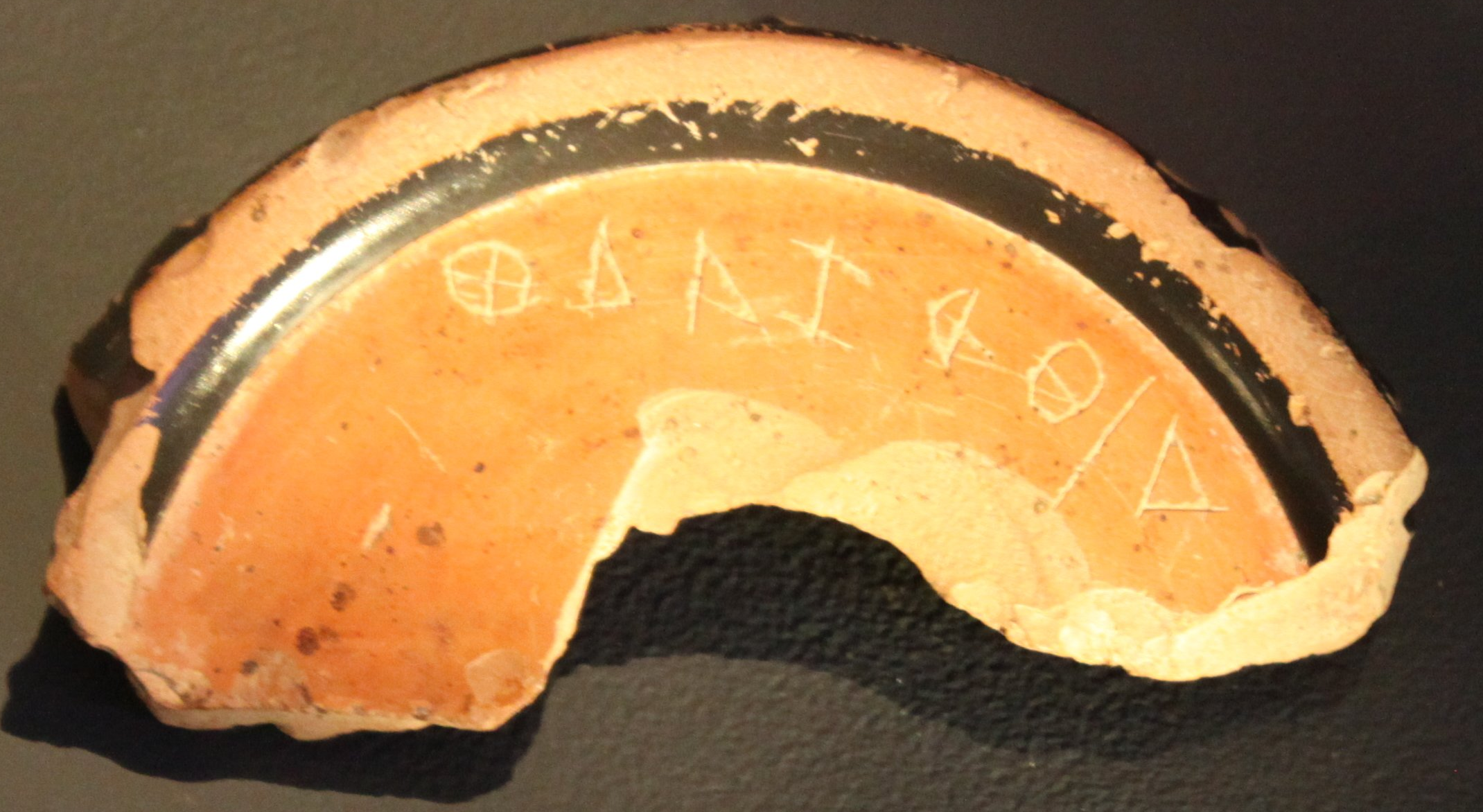
Inscription in Carian of the name 𐊨𐊣𐊠𐊦𐊹𐊸, qlaλiś

Various alphabetic writing systems were in use in Iron Age Anatolia to record Anatolian languages and Phrygian. Several of these languages had previously been written with logographic and syllabic scripts.

The alphabets of Asia Minor proper share characteristics that distinguish them from the earliest attested forms of the Greek alphabet. Many letters in these alphabets resemble Greek letters but have unrelated readings, most extensively in the case of Carian, yet all of them seem to be either descended or related to various regional Greek dialects. The Phrygian and Lemnian alphabets by contrast were early adaptations of regional variants of the Greek alphabet; the earliest Phrygian inscriptions are contemporary with early Greek inscriptions, but contain Greek innovations such as the letters Φ and Ψ which did not exist in the earliest forms of the Greek alphabet.

The Anatolian alphabets fell out of use around the 4th century BCE with the onset of the Hellenistic period.

== Alphabets ==
- The Lydian script, an alphabet used to record the Lydian language from ca. the 5th to 4th centuries BCE; a related script is the "Para-Lydian" alphabet known from a single inscription in Sardis.
- The Para-Lydian script, known from a single inscription found in Sardis Synagogue, language unknown, undeciphered but closely resembles the Lydian script, hence the name.
- The Carian script, recording the Carian language, known from inscriptions in Caria, Egypt and Athens. Only partially understood, there were 45 letters. Many of these resemble the Greek alphabet in form, but have different values.
- The Lycian script, an alphabet recording the Lycian language from the 5th to 4th centuries BCE.
- The Sidetic script, an alphabet of 25 letters, only a few of which are clearly derived from Greek, known from coin legends in what might be a Sidetic language.
- The Pisidian script, an alphabet used to write the Pisidian language. It is attested in about 30 inscriptions around the region of Pisidia.
- The Phrygian script, an alphabet of 21 letters used for the Phrygian language (22 for the Mysian language) which is very similar to early Greek epichoric alphabets, except for the presence of a special character for j.

== See also ==
- History of the alphabet
- Greek alphabet
- Old Italic alphabets
- Northeastern Iberian script
- Iberian scripts
- Linear A
- Linear B
- Luwian hieroglyphs
- Old European script
- Trojan script
- Hittite cuneiform
