= Carian alphabets =

Greek-derived alphabets used to write the Carian language of Anatolia

Carian
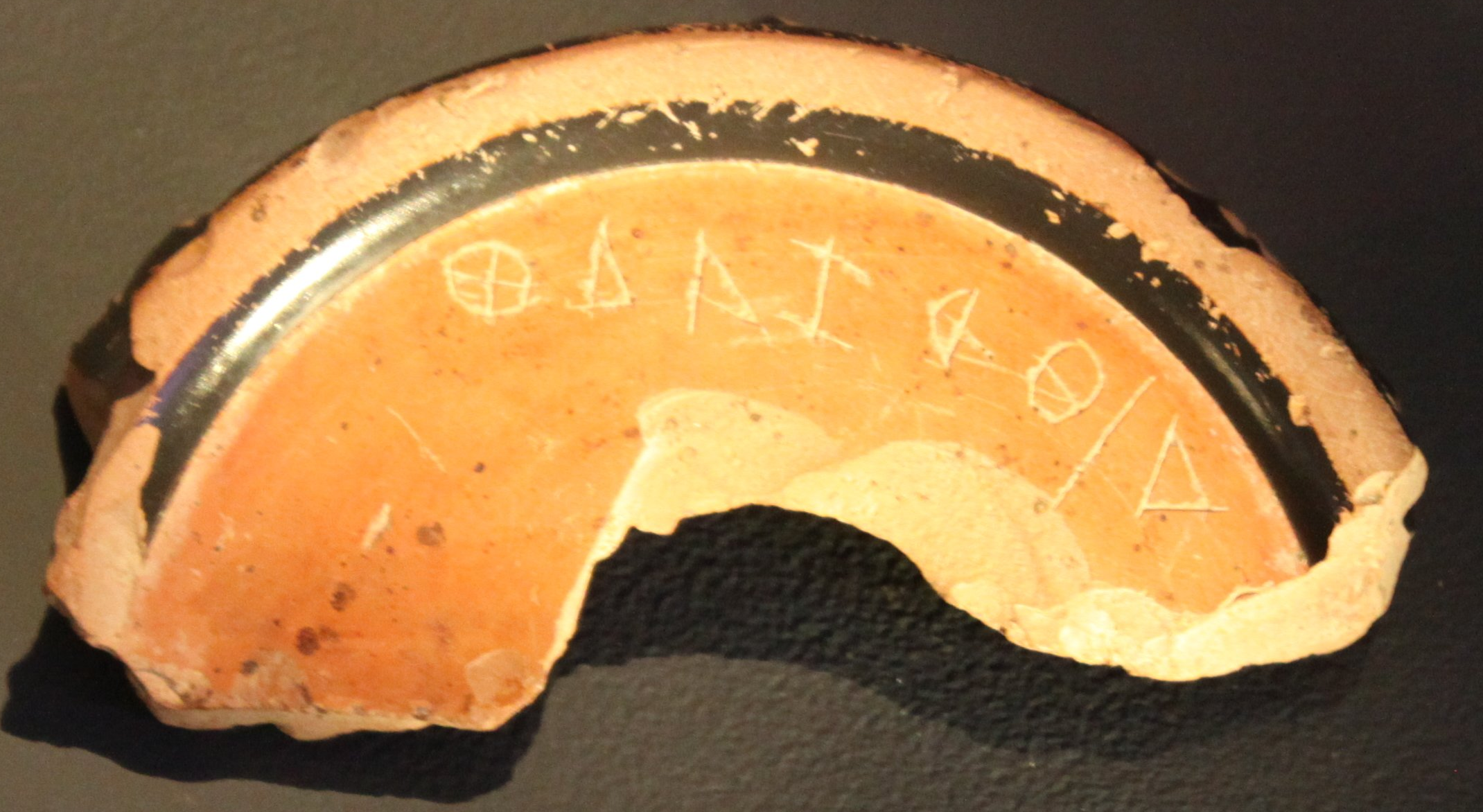
- Inscription in Carian of the name 𐊨𐊣𐊠𐊦𐊹𐊸, qlaλiś
- Script type: Alphabet
- Period: 7th to 1st centuries BCE
- Direction: Left-to-right, right-to-left script
- Languages: Carian language

Related scripts
- Parent systems: Egyptian hieroglyphs: Proto-Sinaitic; Phoenician; Greek alphabet ?; Carian
- Sister systems: Lycian, Lydian, Phrygian

ISO 15924
- ISO 15924: Cari (201), Carian

Unicode
- Unicode alias: Carian
- Unicode range: U+102A0–U+102DF

The Carian alphabets are a number of regional scripts that were used to write the extinct Carian language of western Anatolia. They consist of some 30 alphabetic letters, with several geographic variants in Caria and a homogeneous variant attested from the Nile delta, where Carian mercenaries fought for the Egyptian pharaohs. They were written left-to-right in Caria (apart from the Carian–Lydian city of Tralleis) and right-to-left in Egypt.

Carian was deciphered primarily through Egyptian–Carian bilingual tomb inscriptions, starting with John Ray in 1981; previously only a few sound values and the alphabetic nature of the script had been demonstrated. The readings of Ray and subsequent scholars were largely confirmed with a Carian–Greek bilingual inscription discovered in Kaunos in 1996, which for the first time verified personal names, but the identification of many letters remains provisional and debated, and a few letters are wholly unknown.

The Carian alphabet resembles the Greek alphabet, but the exact Greek variant from which it could have originated has not yet been identified. The main reason for this is that some of the Greek letters have different sound values in Carian. Two hypotheses have been suggested to explain this. The first is that the Greek letters were randomly attributed to phonetic values; though some letters retained their Greek value. The second, proposed by Ignacio J. Adiego in his book The Carian Language, is "that the Carian alphabet underwent a strong process of cursivisation, dramatically changing the form of many letters. At a certain point this graphic system underwent a change to 'capital' letters, for which the Greek capital letters were used as models - but now only from a formal point of view, disregarding their phonetic values."

== Scripts ==
There is a range of graphic variation between cities in Caria, some of which are extreme enough to have separate Unicode characters. (Note: Some of the others, such as Λ, 𐤭, 𝈣, ʘ, Ϲ, Ͷ, 𐊑, Ш, Ϸ, have been filled in below with similar characters from other Unicode ranges.) The Kaunos alphabet is thought to be complete. There may be other letters in Egyptian cities outside Memphis, but they need to be confirmed. There is considerable geographical variation in all letters, especially the representation of the lateral phonemes l and λ. The letters with identified values in the various cities are as follows:

Hyllarima	Euromos	Mylasa	Stratonicea	Kildara	Sinuri	Kaunos	Iasos	Memphis	transl.	IPA	possible Greek origin
𐊠	𐊠	𐊠	𐊠	Ϡ	Ϡ	𐊠	𐊠 𐌀	𐊠	a	/a/	Α
𐊡		« ?	𐋉 (Note: Resembles 6̨ or G̨)			𐋌 𐋍	𐋊	𐋊	β	/ᵐb/	Not a Greek value; perhaps a ligature of Carian 𐊬𐊬. 𐊡 directly from Greek Β.
𐊢 (<)	𐊢 (Ϲ)	𐊢 (<)	𐊢 (Ϲ)	𐊢 (Ϲ)	𐊢 (Ϲ)	𐊢 (Ϲ)		𐊢 (< Ϲ)	d	/ð/?	Δ D
𐋃	𐋃	<_{>}	𐊣	𐋃	𐊣	𐊣	𐊣	𐊣	l	/l~ɾ/?	Λ
𐊤	𐊤	𐋐	𐊤	𐋈	𐋈	𐊤	𐊤 𐋐?	𐊤 Ε	y	/y/	Perhaps a modified Ϝ.
						𐊥	𐊥	𐊥	r	/r/	Ρ
𐋎 𐊣	𐊣	𐊣	𐊦	𐊦	𐊦	𐋏	𐊦	𐊦	λ	/lː~ld/?	Not a Greek value. 𐋎 from Λ plus diacritic, others not Greek.
ʘ	ʘ	ʘ	ʘ	ʘ 𐊨?	ʘ 𐊨?	𐊨	𐊨 ʘ	𐊨	q	/kʷ/	Ϙ
Λ	Λ	Λ		Λ 𐊬	𐊩 𐊬	Γ	Λ	𐊬 Λ	b	/β/?	𐅃 (Note: Archaic form of Β, for example in Crete)
𐊪	𐊪	𐊪	𐊪	𐊪 Ͷ	𐊪 Ͷ	Ͷ	𐊪	𐊪 Ͷ	m	/m/	𐌌 (Note: Archaic form of Μ)
𐊫	𐊫	𐊫	𐊫	𐊫	𐊫	𐊫	𐊫	𐊫	o	/o/	Ο
𐊭	𐊭	𐊭	𐊭	𐊭	𐊭	𐌓	𐊭	𐊭	t	/t/	Τ
𐤭	𐤭		𐤭	𐤭 𐌓	𐤭 𐌓	𐊯	𐤭 𐤧 𐌃	𐊮 Ϸ	š	/ʃ/	Not a Greek value. Perhaps from Ͳ sampi?
𐊰	𐊰	𐊰	𐊰	𐊰	𐊰	𐊰	𐊰	𐊰	s	/s/	Ϻ
			𐊱	𐊱	𐊱	𐊱		𐊱	?	?	
𐊲	𐊲	𐊲	𐊲	𐊲 V	𐊲 V	𐊲	𐊲 V	V 𐊲	u	/u/	Υ /u/
𐊳			𐊳	𐊳	𐊳	𐊳			ñ	/n̩/	
	𐊴	𐊴	𐊛	𐊴	𐊴	𐊴	𐊴 𐊛	𐊴 𐊛	k̂	/c/	Not a Greek value. Maybe a modification of Κ, Χ, or 𐊨.
𐊵	𐊵 𐊜	𐊵	𐊵	𐊵 𐊜	𐊵 𐊜	𐊵	𐊵	𐊜 𐊵	n	/n/	𐌍 (Note: Archaic form of Ν)
𐊷		𐊷	𐊷	𐊷	𐊷	𐊷	𐊷	𐊷	p	/p/	Β (Note: Compare Lydian 𐤡, which also has the value /p/.)
𐊸	𐊸	𐊸	𐊸	𐊸	𐊸	Θ	𐊸	𐊸 Θ	ś	/ç/?	Not a Greek value. Perhaps from Ͳ sampi?
𝈣	𐊹-	⊲-	𐊮-	𐤧-	𐤧-	𐊹	𐊹	𐊹	i	/i/	Ε, ΕΙ, or 𐌇.
𐋏	𐋏	𐋏	𐊺	𐊺	𐊺	𐊺	𐊺	𐊺	e	/e/	Η, 𐌇
𐊽	𐊼 𐊽	𐊼	𐊽	𐊼	𐊼	𐊼	𐊼	𐊼𐊽	k	/k/	Perhaps Ψ (locally /kʰ/) rather than Κ.
𐊾	𐊾	𐊾	𐊾	𐊾	𐊾	𐊾	𐊾	𐊾	δ	/ⁿd/	Not a Greek value. Perhaps a ligature of ΔΔ.
						𐋁? (Note: if 𐋁 is equivalent to 𐋀)	𐋁	𐋀	γ	/ᵑkʷ/?	Not a Greek value.
						𐋂		𐋂	z	/t͡s/ or /st/	Not a Greek value?
				𐋄	𐋄	𐋄			ŋ	/ᵑk/	Not a Greek value. Perhaps a ligature of ΓΓ?
								𐊻	ý	/ɥ/	Not a Greek value; perhaps a modification of Carian 𐊺?
								𐊿 Ш	w	/w/	Ϝ /w/
								𐋅 𐊑	j	/j/	Perhaps related to Phrygian /j/, 𝈿 ~ 𐌔
						𐋆			?		
			𐋃					𐋉	ŕ, ĺ	/rʲ/?	Used in Egypt for Greek ρρ.
𐋇						𐊶? (Note: if 𐊶 is equivalent to 𐋇)		𐋇	τ	/t͡ʃ/	Not a Greek value. Perhaps from Ͳ sampi?

== Origin ==
The Carian scripts, which have a common origin, have long puzzled scholars. Most of the letters resemble letters of the Greek alphabet, but their sound values are generally unrelated to the values of the Greek letters. This is unusual among the alphabets of Asia Minor, which generally approximate the Greek alphabet fairly well, both in sound and shape, apart from sounds which had no equivalent in Greek. However, the Carian sound values are not completely disconnected: 𐊠 /a/ (Greek Α), 𐊫 /o/ (Greek Ο), 𐊰 /s/ (Greek Ϻ san), and 𐊲 /u/ (Greek Υ) are as close to Greek as any Anatolian alphabet, and 𐊷, which resembles Greek Β, has the similar sound /p/, which it shares with Greek-derived Lydian 𐤡.

Ignacio J. Adiego, in his book The Carian Language, therefore suggests that the original Carian script was adopted from cursive Greek, and that it was later restructured, perhaps for monumental inscription, by imitating the form of the most graphically similar Greek print letters without considering their phonetic values. Thus a /t/, which in its cursive form may have had a curved top, was modeled after Greek qoppa (Ϙ) rather than its ancestral tau (Τ) to become 𐊭. Carian /m/, from archaic Greek 𐌌, would have been simplified and was therefore closer in shape to Greek Ν than Μ when it was remodeled as 𐊪. Indeed, many of the regional variants of Carian letters parallel Greek variants: 𐊥 are common graphic variants of digamma, 𐊨 ʘ of theta, 𐊬 Λ of both gamma and lambda, 𐌓 𐊯 𐌃 of rho, 𐊵 𐊜 of phi, 𐊴 𐊛 of chi, 𐊲 V of upsilon, and 𐋏 𐊺 parallel Η 𐌇 eta. This could also explain why one of the rarest letters, 𐊱, has the form of one of the most common Greek letters. However, no such proto-Carian cursive script is attested, so these etymologies are speculative.

Further developments occurred within each script; in Kaunos, for example, it would seem that 𐊮 /š/ and 𐊭 /t/ both came to resemble a Latin P, and so were distinguished with an extra line in one: 𐌓 /t/, 𐊯 /š/.

== Decipherment ==
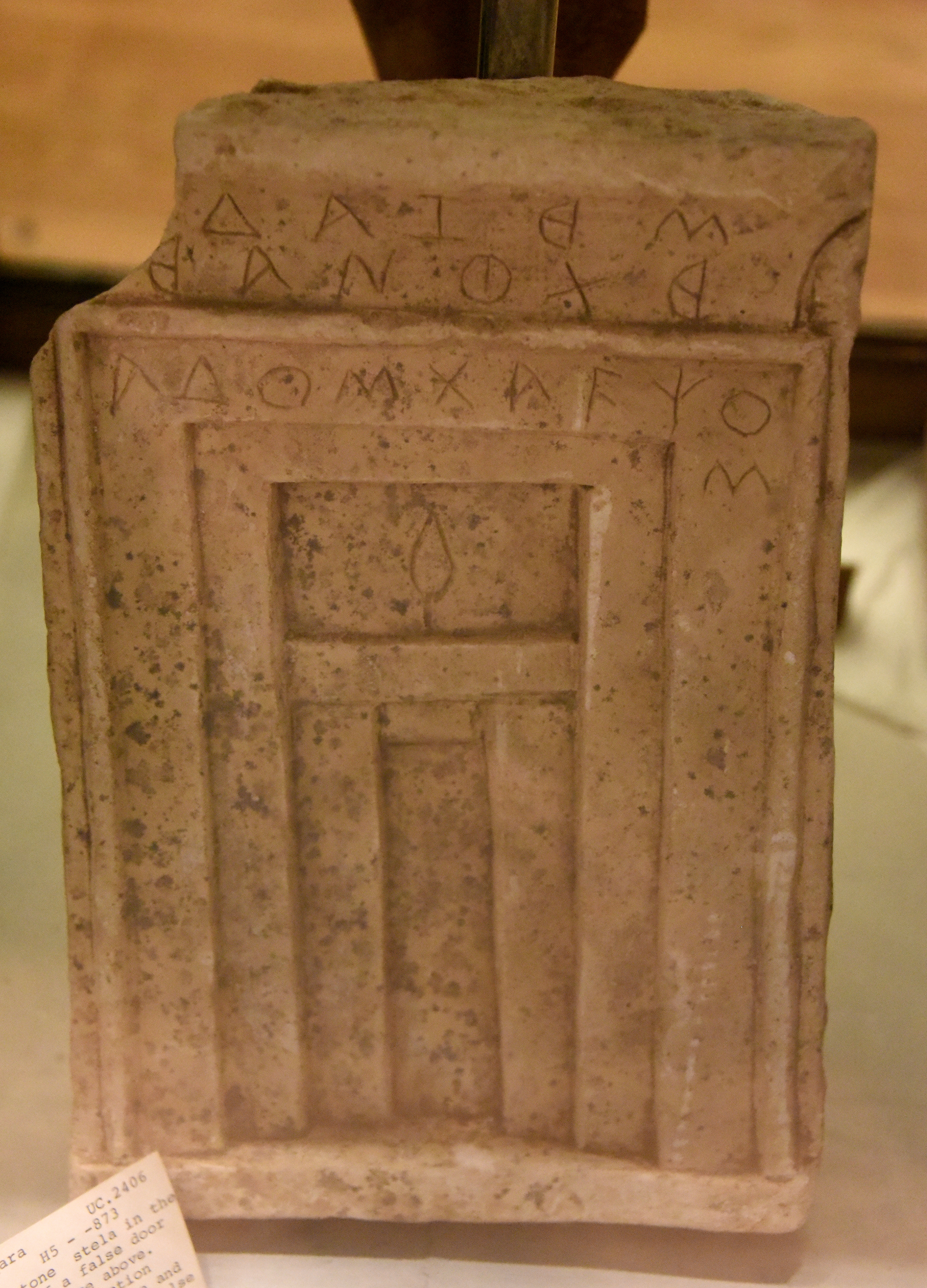
Limestone stela depicting a false door, cornice above. There are Carian inscriptions. Late Period. From Saqqara, H5-873, Egypt. The Petrie Museum of Egyptian Archaeology, London

Numerous attempts at deciphering the Carian inscriptions were made during the 20th century. After World War II, most of the known Carian inscriptions were collected and published, aiding attempts to decipher them.

In the 1960s, Russian researcher Vitaly Shevoroshkin showed that earlier assumptions that the script was a syllabic or semisyllabic writing system were false, instead demonstrating that Carian was alphabetically written. However, he took the values of letters resembling those of the Greek alphabet for granted, which proved to be unfounded.

Other researchers of Carian were H. Stoltenberg, O. Masson, Yuri Otkupshchikov, P. Meriggi (1966), and R. Gusmani (1975), but their work was not widely accepted. Stoltenberg, like most others, generally attributed Greek values to Carian symbols.

In 1972, Egyptologist K. Zauzich investigated bilingual texts in Carian and Egyptian (what became known as the 'Egyptian approach'). This was an important step in decipherment and produced good results. This method was further developed by T. Kowalski in 1975.

British Egyptologist John D. Ray apparently worked independently from Kowalski, but produced similar results (1981, 1983). He used Carian–Egyptian bilingual inscriptions that had been neglected until then. Ray's contributions included the reading of the name Psammetichus (Egyptian Pharaoh) in Carian.

The radically different values that Ray assigned to the letters were initially met with scepticism. Ignasi-Xavier Adiego, along with Diether Schürr, started to contribute to the project in the early 1990s. In his 1993 book Studia Carica, Adiego offered the decipherment values for letters that are now known as the ‘Ray-Schürr-Adiego system’. This system now gained wider acceptance. The discovery of a new bilingual inscription in 1996 (the Kaunos Carian-Greek bilingual inscription) confirmed the essential validity of their decipherment.

== Unicode ==
Carian was added to the Unicode Standard in April, 2008 with the release of version 5.1. It is encoded in Plane 1 (Supplementary Multilingual Plane).

The Unicode block for Carian is U+102A0–U+102DF:

Carian^{[1]}^{[2]} Official Unicode Consortium code chart (PDF)
	0	1	2	3	4	5	6	7	8	9	A	B	C	D	E	F
U+102Ax	𐊠	𐊡	𐊢	𐊣	𐊤	𐊥	𐊦	𐊧	𐊨	𐊩	𐊪	𐊫	𐊬	𐊭	𐊮	𐊯
U+102Bx	𐊰	𐊱	𐊲	𐊳	𐊴	𐊵	𐊶	𐊷	𐊸	𐊹	𐊺	𐊻	𐊼	𐊽	𐊾	𐊿
U+102Cx	𐋀	𐋁	𐋂	𐋃	𐋄	𐋅	𐋆	𐋇	𐋈	𐋉	𐋊	𐋋	𐋌	𐋍	𐋎	𐋏
U+102Dx	𐋐															
Notes: 1. As of Unicode version 17.0; 2. Grey areas indicate non-assigned code points

𐊡𐋊𐋋𐋌𐋍 are graphic variants, as are 𐊤𐋈𐋐, 𐋎𐊦𐋏, 𐊺𐋏, 𐊼𐊽, 𐋂𐋃, 𐋁𐋀, and possibly 𐋇𐊶.

A Carian keyboard is available for use with Keyman.

== See also ==
- Alphabets of Asia Minor
