= Lydian (Unicode block) =

- Range: U+10920..U+1093F (32 code points)
- Plane: SMP
- Scripts: Lydian
- Major alphabets: Lydian
- Assigned: 27 code points
- Unused: 5 reserved code points

Unicode version history
- 5.1 (2008): 27 (+27)

Unicode documentation
- Code chart ∣ Web page

Lydian is a Unicode block containing characters for writing the Lydian language of ancient Anatolia.

Lydian^{[1]}^{[2]} Official Unicode Consortium code chart (PDF)
	0	1	2	3	4	5	6	7	8	9	A	B	C	D	E	F
U+1092x	𐤠	𐤡	𐤢	𐤣	𐤤	𐤥	𐤦	𐤧	𐤨	𐤩	𐤪	𐤫	𐤬	𐤭	𐤮	𐤯
U+1093x	𐤰	𐤱	𐤲	𐤳	𐤴	𐤵	𐤶	𐤷	𐤸	𐤹						𐤿
Notes: 1. As of Unicode version 16.0; 2. Grey areas indicate non-assigned code points

== History ==
The following Unicode-related documents record the purpose and process of defining specific characters in the Lydian block:

Version	Final code points (Note: Proposed code points and characters names may differ from final code points and names)	Count	L2 ID	WG2 ID	Document
5.1	U+10920..10939, 1093F	27	L2/00-128		Bunz, Carl-Martin (2000-03-01), Scripts from the Past in Future Versions of Unicode
5.1	U+10920..10939, 1093F	27	L2/05-102	N2940	Everson, Michael (2005-04-27), Proposal for encoding the Lydian script in the UCS
5.1	U+10920..10939, 1093F	27	L2/05-241		Everson, Michael (2005-08-31), Old Anatolian scripts
5.1	U+10920..10939, 1093F	27	L2/05-380	N3109R	Everson, Michael (2006-01-12), Proposal to encode the Lycian and Lydian scripts
5.1	U+10920..10939, 1093F	27	L2/06-050	N3019R2	Everson, Michael (2006-02-05), Proposal to encode the Lycian and Lydian scripts in the SMP of the UCS
5.1	U+10920..10939, 1093F	27	L2/06-008R2		Moore, Lisa (2006-02-13), "C.1", UTC #106 Minutes
5.1	U+10920..10939, 1093F	27		N2953 (pdf, doc)	Umamaheswaran, V. S. (2006-02-16), "7.4.2", Unconfirmed minutes of WG 2 meeting 47, Sophia Antipolis, France; 2005-09-12/15
5.1	U+10920..10939, 1093F	27		N3103 (pdf, doc)	Umamaheswaran, V. S. (2006-08-25), "M48.7", Unconfirmed minutes of WG 2 meeting 48, Mountain View, CA, USA; 2006-04-24/27
