= Lydian alphabet =

Alphabet used to write the Lydian language

Lydian
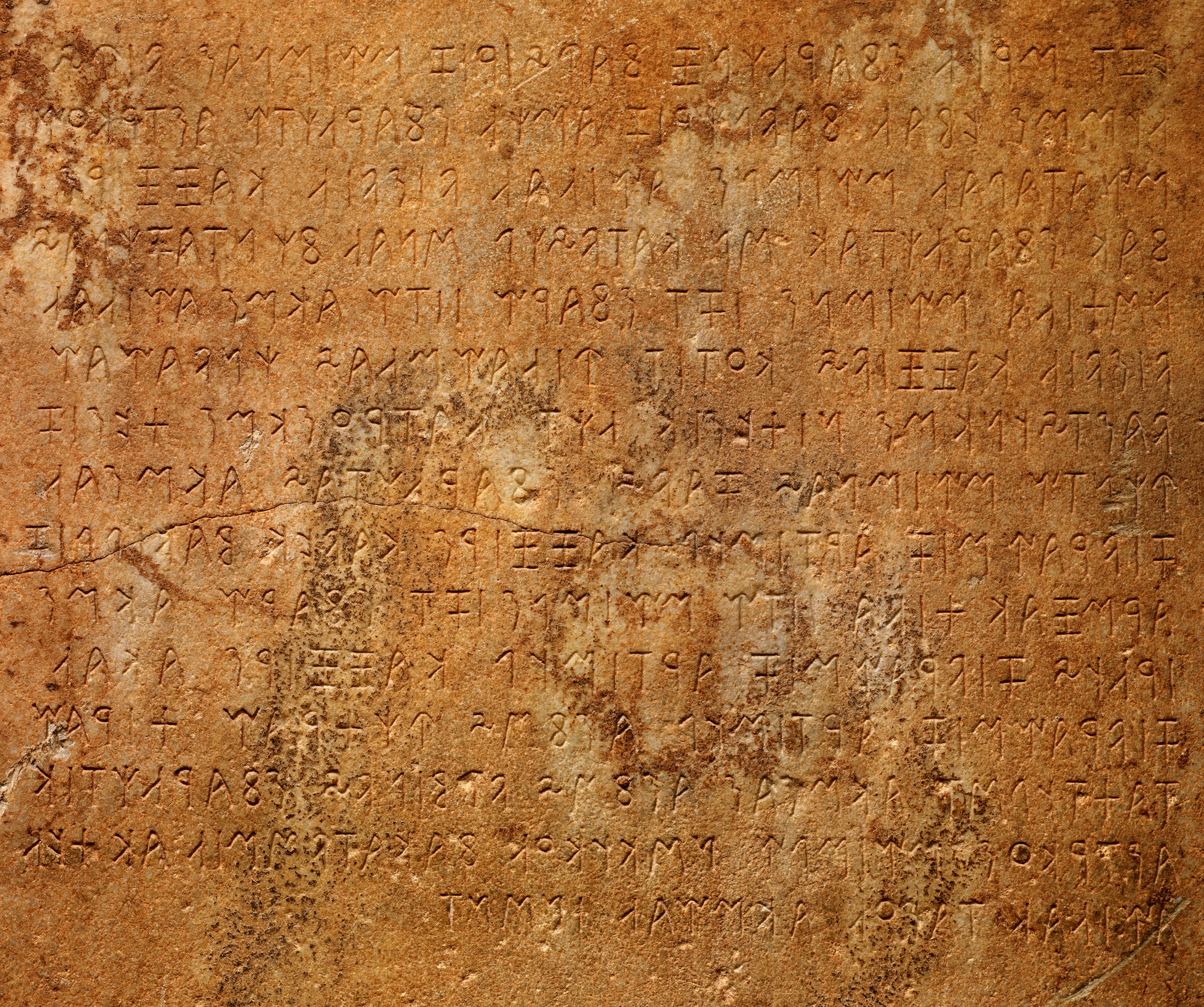
- Script type: Alphabet
- Period: 700-200 BCE
- Direction: Right-to-left script
- Languages: Lydian language

Related scripts
- Parent systems: Egyptian hieroglyphs: Proto-Sinaitic; Phoenician; Anatolian; Lydian
- Sister systems: Some other alphabets of Asia Minor

ISO 15924
- ISO 15924: Lydi (116), Lydian

Unicode
- Unicode alias: Lydian
- Unicode range: U+10920–U+1093F

Lydian script was used to write the Lydian language. Like other scripts of Anatolia in the Iron Age, the Lydian alphabet is based on the Phoenician alphabet. It is related to the East Greek alphabet, but it has unique features.

The first modern codification of the Lydian alphabet was made by Roberto Gusmani in 1964, in a combined lexicon, grammar, and text collection.

Early Lydian texts were written either from left to right or from right to left. Later texts all run from right to left. One surviving text is in the bi-directional boustrophedon manner. Spaces separate words except in one text that uses dots instead. Lydian uniquely features a quotation mark in the shape of a triangle.

== Alphabet ==
The Lydian alphabet is closely related to the other alphabets of Asia Minor as well as to the Greek alphabet. It contains letters for 26 sounds. Some are represented by more than one symbol, which is considered one "letter." Unlike the Carian alphabet, which had an f derived from Φ, the Lydian f has the peculiar 8 shape also found in the Neo-Etruscan alphabet and in Italic alphabets of Osco-Umbrian languages such as Oscan, Umbrian, Old Sabine and South Picene (Old Volscian), and it is thought to be an invention of speakers of a Sabellian language (Osco-Umbrian languages).

The Lydian Alphabet
Letter		Transliteration	Sound (IPA)	Notes
Text	Image	Transliteration	Sound (IPA)	Notes
𐤠		a	[a]	
𐤡		traditional: b new: p	[p~b]	Plain labial voiced to [b] before nasals and probably [r]
𐤢		g	[ɡ]	Occasionally substituted for secondarily voiced /k/.
𐤣		d	[θ~ð]?	Descends from non-initial PIE *d and *dʰ, lenited PIE *t, and PIE *i̯; most likely an interdental [θ~ð] though another coronal fricative such as [z] is possible
𐤤		e	[eː]	Fairly high and long, like Greek ει; only occurs accented.
𐤥		traditional: v new: w	[w~v]	Descends from PIE *w; may have been labiodental. Now usually transcribed w to avoid confusion with ν for the nasal 𐤸.
𐤦		i	[i]	
𐤧		y	[i̯~j]?	Apparently an allophone of /i/, perhaps when unstressed. Attested only 11 times: artymu- ~ artimu-. It may be a borrowing of Carian 𐊹.
𐤨		k	[k~ɡ]	Voiced to [ɡ] before nasals and probably [r]
𐤩		l	[l]	
𐤪		m	[m]	
𐤫		n	[n]	
𐤬		o	[oː]	Fairly high and long, like Greek ου; only occurs accented.
𐤭		r	[r]	
𐤮		traditional: ś new: s	[s]	A simple [s], despite its former traditional transcription.
𐤯		t	[t~d]	Voiced to [d] before nasals and probably [r]
𐤰		u	[u]	
𐤱		f	[f] or [ɸ]	Labiodental or bilabial fricative. Alternates with /w/ in: 𐤩𐤤𐤱𐤮~𐤩𐤤𐤥𐤮 lews~lefs "Zeus"
𐤲		q	[kʷ]	At least historically [kʷ]; it is not clear if this pronunciation was still current.
𐤳		traditional: s new: š	[ʃ] or [ç]	Palatalized *s. Newer transcriptions use š.
𐤴		τ	[tʃ] or [tç]	𐤴𐤴 ττ results from 𐤯+𐤳 t+š as in: 𐤨𐤠𐤯+𐤳𐤠𐤣𐤪𐤶𐤮 > 𐤨𐤠𐤴𐤴𐤠𐤣𐤪𐤶𐤮 kat+šadmẽs > kaττadmẽs
𐤵		ã	nasal vowel	Perhaps [ãː]. Only occurs accented. Ã or a is found before a nasal consonant: aλiksãntruλ ~ aλiksantruλ.
𐤶		ẽ	nasal vowel	Not [ẽ]; perhaps [ã] or [æ̃] as in Lycian. Only occurs accented.
𐤷		λ	[ʎ] (or [ɾʲ]?)	Palatalized *l (or palatalized flap?)
𐤸		traditional: ν new: ñ	[ɲ] or [ŋ]?	Arose from word-final or palatalized *m and *n; later loss of final vowels caused it to contrast with those sounds. Transliterated as a Greek ν (nu). A new transcription is ñ, to avoid confusion with the Latin letter v and parallel to the Lycian letter transcribed as ñ, also with similar but unclear pronunciation.)
𐤹		c	[ts~dz]?	An undetermined affricate or fricative: [ts], [z], [dz], or [dʒ], etc. At least one origin is assibilated PIE *d.

In addition, two digraphs, aa and ii, appear to be allophones of [a] and [i] under speculative circumstances, such as lengthening from stress. Complex consonant clusters often appear in the inscriptions and, if present, an epenthetic schwa was evidently not written: 𐤥𐤹𐤯𐤣𐤦𐤣 wctdid [wt͡stθiθ], 𐤨𐤮𐤡𐤷𐤯𐤬𐤨 kspλtok [kspʎ̩tok].

Note: a newer transliteration employing p for b, s for ś, š for s, and/or w for v appears in recent publications and the online Dictionary of the Minor Languages of Ancient Anatolia (eDiAna), as well as Melchert's Lydian corpus.

=== Examples of words ===
𐤬𐤭𐤠 ora [ora] "month"

𐤩𐤠𐤲𐤭𐤦𐤳𐤠 laqriša [lakʷriʃa] "wall, dromos" or "inscription"

𐤡𐤦𐤭𐤠 pira [pira] "house, home"

𐤥𐤹𐤡𐤠𐤲𐤶𐤫𐤯 wcpaqẽnt [w̩t͡spaˈkʷãnd] "to trample on" (from PIE *pekʷ- "to crush")

== Unicode ==
The Lydian alphabet was added to the Unicode Standard in April, 2008 with the release of version 5.1. It is encoded in Plane 1 (Supplementary Multilingual Plane).

The Unicode block for Lydian is U+10920–U+1093F:

Lydian^{[1]}^{[2]} Official Unicode Consortium code chart (PDF)
	0	1	2	3	4	5	6	7	8	9	A	B	C	D	E	F
U+1092x	𐤠	𐤡	𐤢	𐤣	𐤤	𐤥	𐤦	𐤧	𐤨	𐤩	𐤪	𐤫	𐤬	𐤭	𐤮	𐤯
U+1093x	𐤰	𐤱	𐤲	𐤳	𐤴	𐤵	𐤶	𐤷	𐤸	𐤹						𐤿
Notes 1.As of Unicode version 17.0 2.Grey areas indicate non-assigned code points

== See also ==
- Lydian language
- Lydia
- Lydians
- Runes
