= Sardis bilingual inscription =

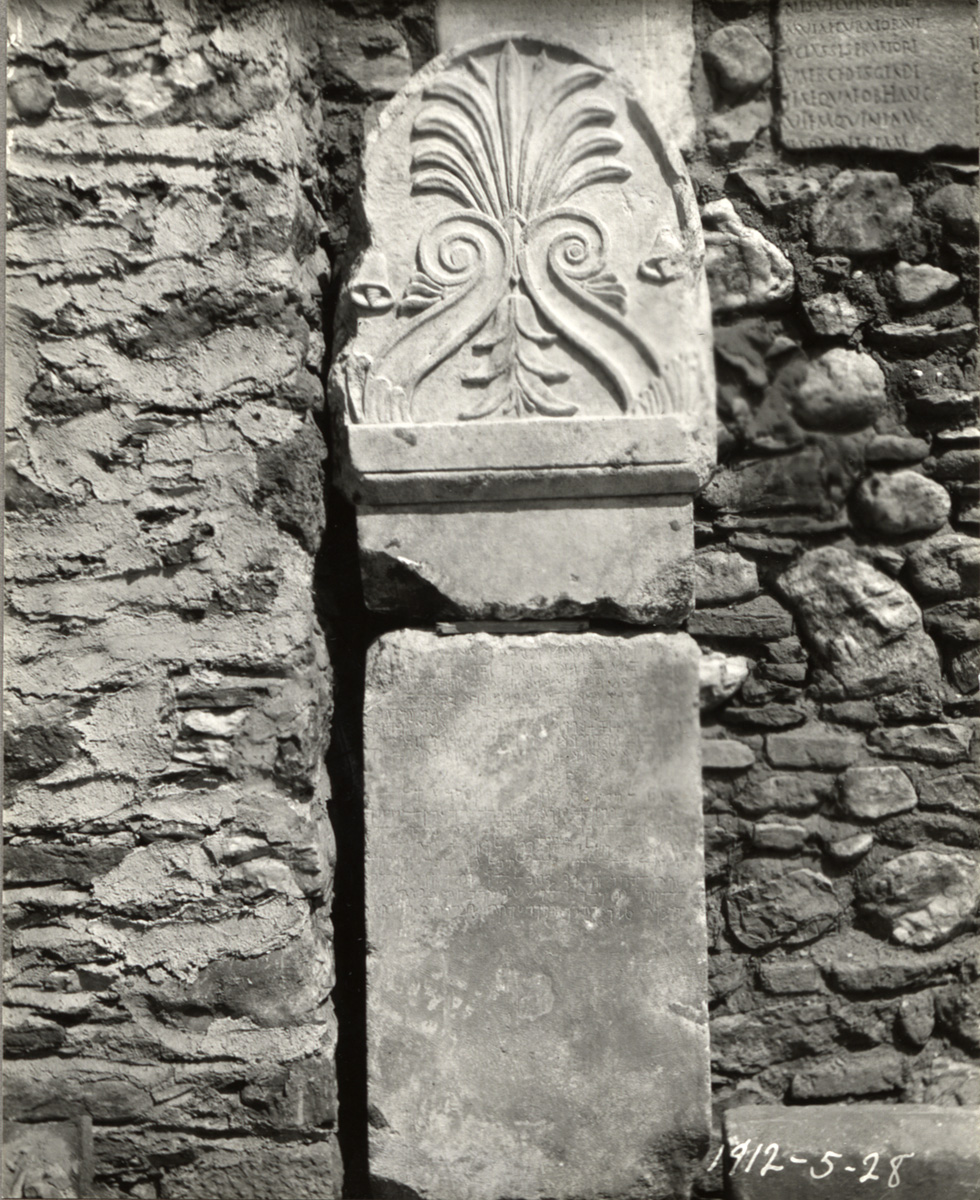
- Created: c. 394 BC
- Discovered: 1912; Sart, Manisa, Turkey
- Present location: İzmir Archaeology Museum
- Language: Lydian and Aramaic

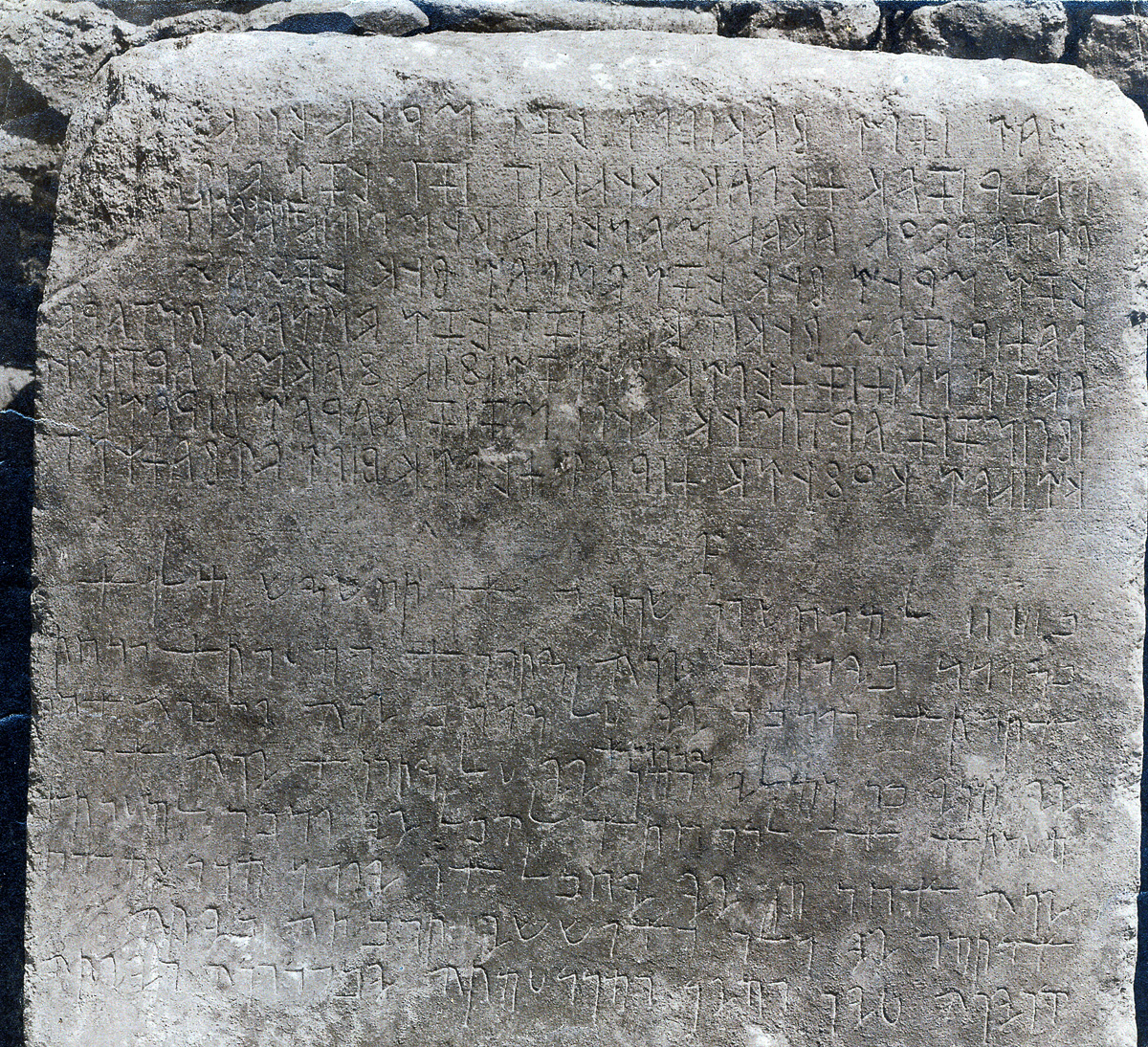
Sardis bilingual inscription close up

The Sardis bilingual inscription is a 4th-century BCE bilingual Lydian-Aramaic funerary inscription discovered in 1912, during the investigation by the American Society for the Excavation of Sardis. It was found in Sardis, in Manisa, Turkey.

It was the "Rosetta Stone" for the decipherment of the Lydian language.

The Aramaic inscription begins by stating the date as the tenth year of Artaxerxes, considered to be Artaxerxes II, such that the inscription has been dated by scholars to 394 BCE.

It is currently in the İzmir Archaeology Museum.

The Aramaic inscription is known as KAI 260. An analysis of the inscription was first published in 1917 by Stanley Arthur Cook.

It was found in a secondary location, having been reused in the Greek or Roman era to build a thick low wall on the "northern slope of the Nekropolis hill west of the Paktolos" along with a dozen other inscriptions.

== Bibliography ==
- Cook, Stanley A. “A Lydian-Aramaic Bilingual.” The Journal of Hellenic Studies, vol. 37, 1917, pp. 77–87. JSTOR, www.jstor.org/stable/625457
- Torrey, C. (1918). The Bilingual Inscription from Sardis. The American Journal of Semitic Languages and Literatures, 34(3), 185-198 http://www.jstor.org/stable/528643
- Lipiński, Edward (1975). Studies in Aramaic Inscriptions and Onomastics. Peeters Publishers. ISBN 978-90-6186-019-8.
- Hanfmann, G. (1976). ON LYDIAN AND EASTERN GREEK ANTHEMION STELAI. Revue Archéologique, (1), 35–44. Retrieved May 22, 2021, from http://www.jstor.org/stable/41747583
- Fred Woudhuizen, The Lydian-Aramaic Bilingual Inscription from Sardis Reconsidered
- Anthemion with Lydian-Aramaic Bilingual Inscription, Stele of Manes, Son of Kumlis
- Butler, H.C. 1922. Sardis I: The Excavations, Part 1: 1910–1914. Publications of the American Society for the Excavation of Sardis 1. Leiden: E. J. Brill
  - Sardis VI
- Gusmani, R. 1964. Lydisches Wörterbuch, mit grammatischer Skizze und Inschriftensammlung. Heidelberg: C. Winter.
