= Christopher Cox (British educationist) =

British educationist

Sir Christopher William Machell Cox, GCMG (17 November 1899 – 6 July 1982) was a British educationist. A long-serving educational adviser to the Colonial Office, he played a key role in the development of colonial education within the British Empire.

== Biography ==
=== Early life and academic career ===
Born in Hastings, Sussex, Christopher was the son of Arthur Henry Machell Cox (1870–1947), a schoolmaster and his wife, Dorothy Alice Wimbush (1876–1947). Cox was educated at Clifton College, then served briefly in the Royal Engineers in 1918 before attending Balliol College, Oxford, where he took first-class honours in classical moderations (1920) and literae humaniores (1923).

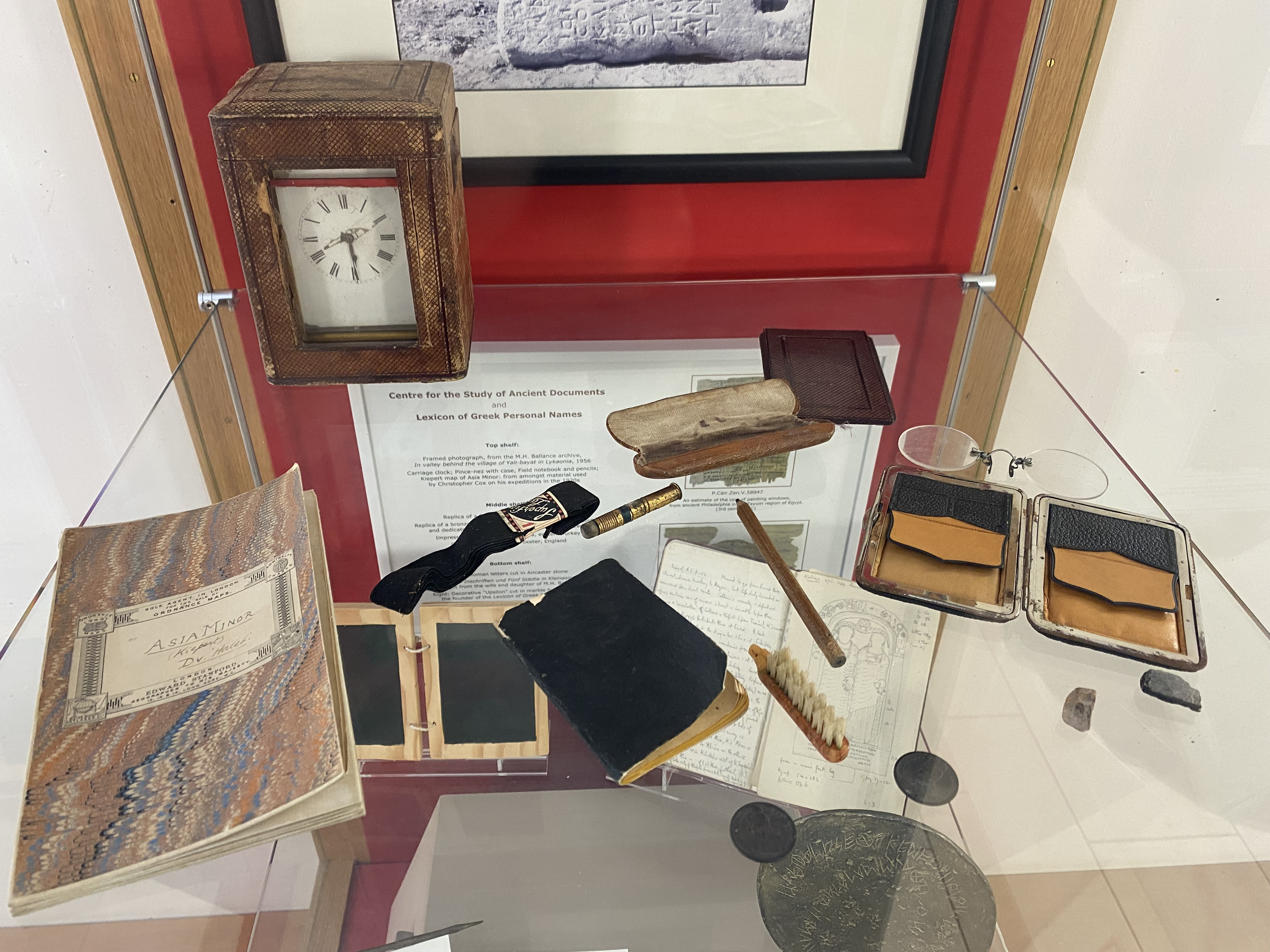
Material used by Cox during his expeditions in the 1920s.

Cox then pursued post-graduate studies, and undertook archeological expeditions in Turkey from 1924 to 1931, the results of which formed the basis for three volumes of the Monumenta Asiae Minoris Antiqua. Volume V, which he published in 1937 with Archibald Cameron, was the only one to appear during his lifetime, and was his only major research publication during his career. Along with Cameron, he also discovered the only possible known inscription in the Mysian language.

In 1924, Cox was elected to a university Craven fellowship and to a senior demyship at Magdalen College, Oxford. Two years later, he was elected as a fellow and tutor of New College, Oxford, where he taught ancient Greek history. He remained a fellow of New College, where he was a popular tutor, for the rest of his life.

=== Involvement with Africa and colonial education ===
In the words of Clive Whitehead, "Cox might well have lived out the rest of his life as a popular but essentially obscure don at Oxford had it not been for an early interest in the African colonies". He developed an early interest in the African colonies from his friendship with C. H. Baynes, his contemporary at Balliol, who taught for several years in Lagos before returning to England as headmaster of the New College Choir School. In 1929, Cox visited South Africa as part of a British Association for the Advancement of Science delegation; he decided to return overland to Cairo via Khartoum, where he became friends with many local educators.

In 1937, "literally out of the Sudanese blue", Cox was invited to spend two years in Sudan as Director of Education and Principal of Gordon College, the forerunner of the University of Khartoum. Cox leaped at the opportunity and, having arranged a secondment from New College, spent two happy years in Sudan building up Gordon College. The same year, Lord de la Warr's education commission visited Gordon College, and Cox was thanked in the report for the valuable assistance he gave, attracting favourable official notice.

Having refused the headship of Makerere College in Uganda in 1939 and of Achimota College in the Gold Coast in 1939, Cox returned to Oxford shortly before the outbreak of the Second World War.
