= Thodosa =

Town of ancient Caria

Thodosa was a town of ancient Caria. Its name does not appear in ancient authors, but is inferred from epigraphic evidence. It was a polis (city-state) and was in a sympoliteia with Theangela and Kildara.

Its site is unlocated.
