= Kildara =

Ancient Carian town

Coordinates: 37°10′53″N 27°41′35″E

Kildara (Ancient Greek: Κιλδαρα) or Killara (Κιλλαρα) was a town of ancient Caria. It was a polis (city-state) and was in a sympoliteia with Theangela and Thodosa. Kildara is the find-spot of one inscription in the Carian language using a unique local type of Carian script.

Its site is located near Asardağ, Asiatic Turkey.
