= Carian (Unicode block) =

- Range: U+102A0..U+102DF (64 code points)
- Plane: SMP
- Scripts: Carian
- Major alphabets: Carian
- Assigned: 49 code points
- Unused: 15 reserved code points

Unicode version history
- 5.1 (2008): 49 (+49)

Unicode documentation
- Code chart ∣ Web page

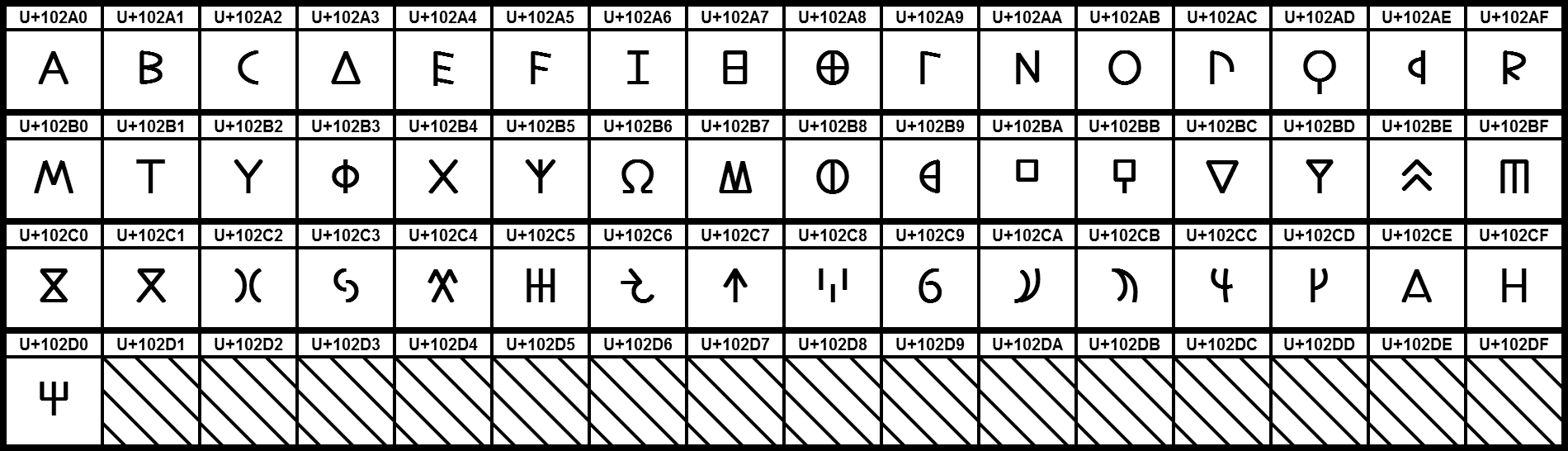
Graphical representation of the Carian Unicode block

Carian is a Unicode block containing the Masson set and four additional characters for writing the ancient Carian language in Caria and Egypt, where the Carians served as mercenaries.

Carian^{[1]}^{[2]} Official Unicode Consortium code chart (PDF)
	0	1	2	3	4	5	6	7	8	9	A	B	C	D	E	F
U+102Ax	𐊠	𐊡	𐊢	𐊣	𐊤	𐊥	𐊦	𐊧	𐊨	𐊩	𐊪	𐊫	𐊬	𐊭	𐊮	𐊯
U+102Bx	𐊰	𐊱	𐊲	𐊳	𐊴	𐊵	𐊶	𐊷	𐊸	𐊹	𐊺	𐊻	𐊼	𐊽	𐊾	𐊿
U+102Cx	𐋀	𐋁	𐋂	𐋃	𐋄	𐋅	𐋆	𐋇	𐋈	𐋉	𐋊	𐋋	𐋌	𐋍	𐋎	𐋏
U+102Dx	𐋐															
Notes: 1. As of Unicode version 16.0; 2. Grey areas indicate non-assigned code points

== History ==
The following Unicode-related documents record the purpose and process of defining specific characters in the Carian block:

Version	Final code points (Note: Proposed code points and characters names may differ from final code points and names)	Count	L2 ID	WG2 ID	Document
5.1	U+102A0..102D0	49	L2/00-128		Bunz, Carl-Martin (2000-03-01), Scripts from the Past in Future Versions of Unicode
5.1	U+102A0..102D0	49	L2/00-153		Bunz, Carl-Martin (2000-04-26), Further comments on historic scripts
5.1	U+102A0..102D0	49	L2/05-100	N2938	Everson, Michael (2005-04-27), Proposal for encoding the Carian script in the UCS
5.1	U+102A0..102D0	49	L2/05-241		Everson, Michael (2005-08-31), Old Anatolian scripts
5.1	U+102A0..102D0	49	L2/05-386	N3020R	Everson, Michael (2006-01-12), Proposal to encode the Carian script in the SMP of the UCS
5.1	U+102A0..102D0	49	L2/06-008R2		Moore, Lisa (2006-02-13), "C.2", UTC #106 Minutes
5.1	U+102A0..102D0	49		N2953 (pdf, doc)	Umamaheswaran, V. S. (2006-02-16), "7.4.2", Unconfirmed minutes of WG 2 meeting 47, Sophia Antipolis, France; 2005-09-12/15
5.1	U+102A0..102D0	49		N3103 (pdf, doc)	Umamaheswaran, V. S. (2006-08-25), "M48.8", Unconfirmed minutes of WG 2 meeting 48, Mountain View, CA, USA; 2006-04-24/27
