= Lycian alphabet =

Alphabet used to write the Lycian language

Lycian
- Script type: Alphabet
- Period: c.500 – c.200 BC
- Direction: Left-to-right
- Languages: Lycian language

Related scripts
- Parent systems: Phoenician: Greek?; Lycian
- Sister systems: Carian, Lydian, Phrygian

ISO 15924
- ISO 15924: Lyci (202), Lycian

Unicode
- Unicode alias: Lycian
- Unicode range: U+10280–U+1029F

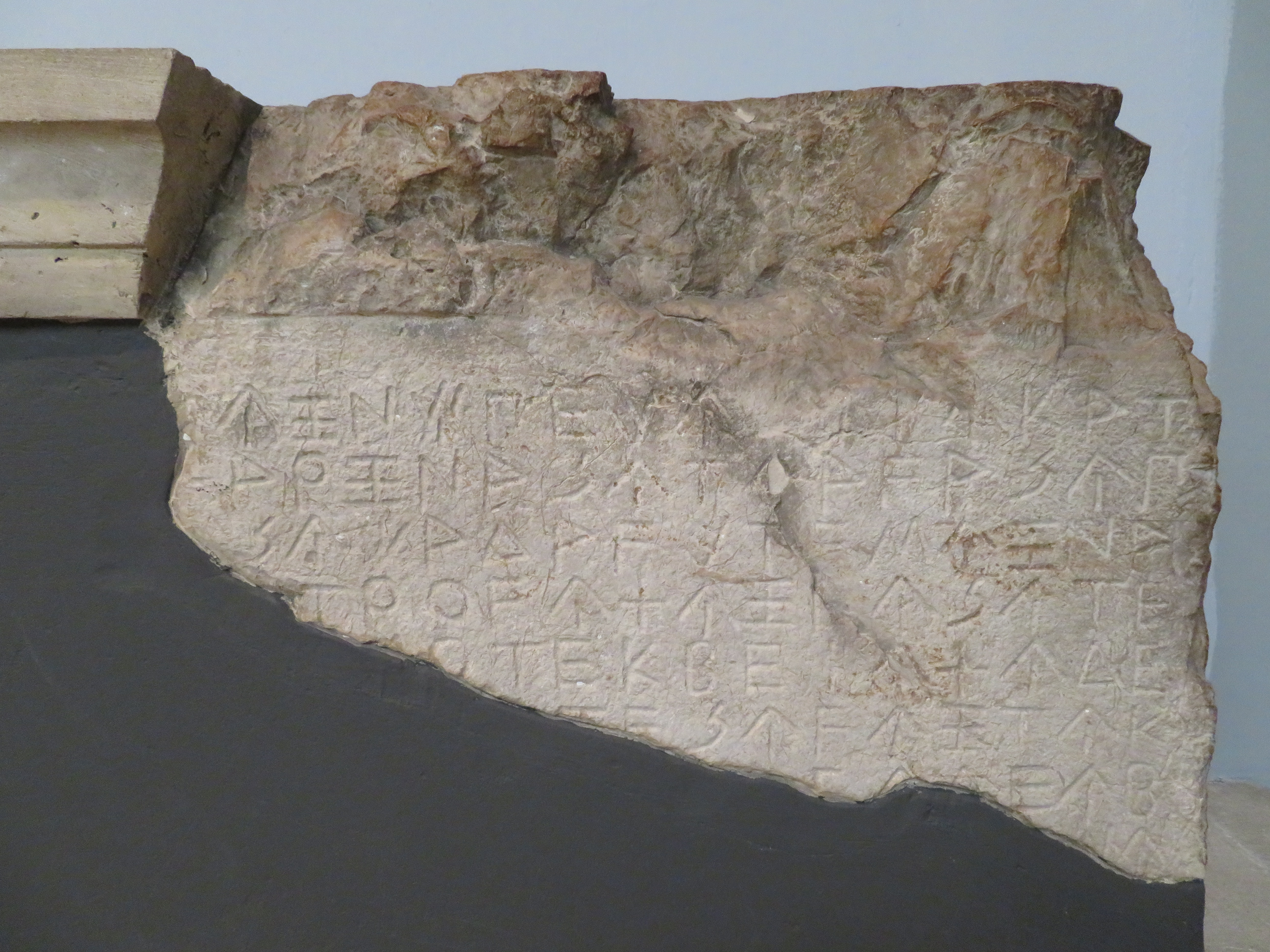
The Decree of Pixodaros in the Lycian script

The Lycian alphabet was used to write the Lycian language of the Asia Minor region of Lycia. It was an extension of the Greek alphabet, with half a dozen additional letters for sounds not found in Greek. It was largely similar to the Lydian and the Phrygian alphabets.

== The alphabet ==
The Lycian alphabet contains letters for 29 sounds. Some sounds are represented by more than one symbol, which is considered one "letter". There are six vowel letters, one for each of the four oral vowels of Lycian, and separate letters for two of the four nasal vowels. Nine of the Lycian letters do not appear to derive from the Greek alphabet.

The Lycian alphabet
Lycian letter	Transliteration	IPA	Notes
𐊀	a	[a]	
𐊂	b	[β]	
𐊄	g	[ɣ]	
𐊅	d	[ð]	
𐊆	i	[i], [ĩ]	
𐊇	w	[w]	
𐊈	z	[t͡s]	
𐊛	h	[h]	
𐊉	θ	[θ]	
𐊊	j or y	[j]	
𐊋	k	[kʲ]	[ɡʲ] after nasals
𐊍	l	[l] and [l̩]~[əl]	
𐊎	m	[m]	
𐊏	n	[n]	
𐊒	u	[u], [ũ]	
𐊓	p	[p]	[b] after nasals
𐊔	κ or c	[k]? [kʲ]? [h(e)]	
𐊕	r	[r] and [r̩]~[ər]	
𐊖	s	[s]	
𐊗	t	[t]	[d] after nasals. ñt is [d] as in 𐊑𐊗𐊁𐊎𐊒𐊜𐊍𐊆𐊅𐊀 / Ñtemuχlida for Greek Δημοκλείδης / Dēmokleídēs.
𐊁	e	[e]	
𐊙	ã	[ã]	𐊍𐊒𐊖𐊙𐊗𐊕𐊀 / Lusãtra for Greek Λύσανδρος / Lúsandros.
𐊚	ẽ	[ẽ]	
𐊐	m̃	[m̩], [əm], [m.]	originally perhaps syllabic [m], later coda [m]
𐊑	ñ	[n̩], [ən], [n.]	originally perhaps syllabic [n], later coda [n]
𐊘	τ	[tʷ]? [t͡ʃ]?	
𐊌	q	[k]	[ɡ] after nasals
𐊃	β	[k]? [kʷ]?	voiced after nasals
𐊜	χ	[q]	[ɢ] after nasals

== Numbers ==
Lycian uses the following number symbols: I (vertical stroke) = 1, < ("less than" sign) (or, rarely, L or C or V or Y) = 5, O (circle) = 10; a horizontal stroke — is one half; a symbol somewhat like our letter H may mean 100.

The number 128½ would therefore be expressed as HOO<III—.

== Unicode ==
The Lycian alphabet was added to the Unicode Standard in April, 2008 with the release of version 5.1. It is encoded in Plane 1 (Supplementary Multilingual Plane).

The Unicode block for Lycian is U+10280–U+1029F:

Lycian^{[1]}^{[2]} Official Unicode Consortium code chart (PDF)
	0	1	2	3	4	5	6	7	8	9	A	B	C	D	E	F
U+1028x	𐊀	𐊁	𐊂	𐊃	𐊄	𐊅	𐊆	𐊇	𐊈	𐊉	𐊊	𐊋	𐊌	𐊍	𐊎	𐊏
U+1029x	𐊐	𐊑	𐊒	𐊓	𐊔	𐊕	𐊖	𐊗	𐊘	𐊙	𐊚	𐊛	𐊜			
Notes: 1. As of Unicode version 17.0; 2. Grey areas indicate non-assigned code points

== See also ==
- Letoon trilingual
- Lycian language
