= Theangela =

Ancient Carian town

Coordinates: 37°02′40″N 27°35′42″E

Theangela (Ancient Greek: Θεάγγελα) was a town of ancient Caria. Upon the conquest of Caria by Alexander the Great, he placed it under the jurisdiction of Halicarnassus. It was birthplace of Philippus of Theangela, a 4th-century BCE historian. It was a polis (city-state) and a member of the Delian League. It was in a sympoliteia with Kildara and Thodosa.

Its site is located near Etrim, Asiatic Turkey.
