= Mysian language =

Extinct Indo-European language

Mysian
- Native to: Turkey
- Region: Mysia
- Ethnicity: Mysians
- Extinct: 1st century BC
- Language family: Indo-European: Graeco-Phrygian?; Phrygian?; Mysian
- Writing system: Mysian alphabet

Language codes
- ISO 639-3: yms
- Glottolog: mysi1239

Mysian (Note: It is sometimes called "Lutescan" in older sources.) was spoken by Mysians inhabiting Mysia in north-west Anatolia.

Little is known about the Mysian language. Strabo noted that it was, "in a way, a mixture of the Lydian and Phrygian languages". As such, the Mysian language could be a language of the Anatolian or Phrygian group. However, a passage in Athenaeus suggests that the Mysian language was akin to the barely attested Paeonian language of Paeonia, north of Macedon. It is believed that along with Phrygian, the language was thought to have entered Anatolia from the Balkans.

== Inscription ==
Only one inscription is known that may be in the Mysian language. It has seven lines of about 20 signs each, written from right to left (sinistroverse), but the first two lines are very incomplete. The inscription dates from between the 5th and 3rd centuries BCE and was found in 1926 by Christopher William Machell Cox and Archibald Cameron in Üyücek village, 15 km due south of Tavşanlı, in the Tavşanlı district of Kütahya province, near the outskirts of the classical Phrygian territory. The text seems to include Indo-European words.

The alphabet used resembles the Old-Phrygian alphabet, but some signs are quite different:

Mysian versus Phrygian alphabets
sign	,			Δ ?	,		I					,							
Phrygian equivalent				Λ, Δ	,		I					O				T			
transcription	a	b	g	d	e	v	i	k	l	m	n	o	p	r	s	t	u	y	
phoneme	/a/, /a:/	/b/	/g/	/d/	/e/, /e:/	/w/	/i/, /i:/	/k/	/l/	/m/	/n/	/o/, /o:/	/p/	/r/	/s/	/t/	/u/, /u:/	/j/	/ts/ ?

In the past there has been much confusion concerning the sibilants in the alphabet. Initially it was thought that the sign represented a sibilant, transcribed as š or z, but since 1969 it is known that it actually denoted a /j/ sound, transcribed as y. The sign was thought to be a sound not present in the regular Old-Phrygian alphabet and dubbed the "Mysian s", transcribed as ś, but it was in fact the regular s. The sign was formerly transcribed s, but it is in fact the equivalent of the Phrygian sign, probably denoting a /z/, /zd/, or /ts/ sound.

It is uncertain whether the inscription renders a text in the Mysian language or if it is simply a Phrygian dialect from the region of Mysia. Brixhe, discussing the existing literature on the inscription, argues that the language is Phrygian. The seventh line can be read as:

[.]lakes braterais patriyioisk[e]

The words "braterais patriyioisk[e]" have been proposed to mean something like "(for) brothers and fathers / relatives":

- braterais is related to Phrygian βρατερε, Greek φρατήρ, Latin frater, English brother;
- patriyiois is related to New-Phrygian pat(e)res (πατερης, πατρες: 'parents'), Greek πάτριος ('relative of the father'), Latin pater, English father;
- and -ke is a Phrygian suffix meaning and, cf. Greek τε and Latin -que, 'and'.

Lakes (or -lakes, a first sign may be missing; alternatively, according to Friedrich, read ...likeś) is most probably a personal name. However, Friedrich indicates that the reading is variable, and writes "instead of k also p or a conceivably, instead of e[,] v is possible, instead of ś maybe i." (translated from the original German)
