= Phrygian language =

Extinct Indo-European language of central Anatolia

Phrygian
- Region: Central Anatolia (in modern Turkey)
- Ethnicity: Phrygians
- Extinct: after 5th century CE
- Language family: Indo-European: (?) Graeco-Phrygian; Phrygian
- Dialects: ?Mysian
- Writing system: Phrygian alphabet Greek alphabet

Language codes
- ISO 639-3: xpg
- Glottolog: phry1239
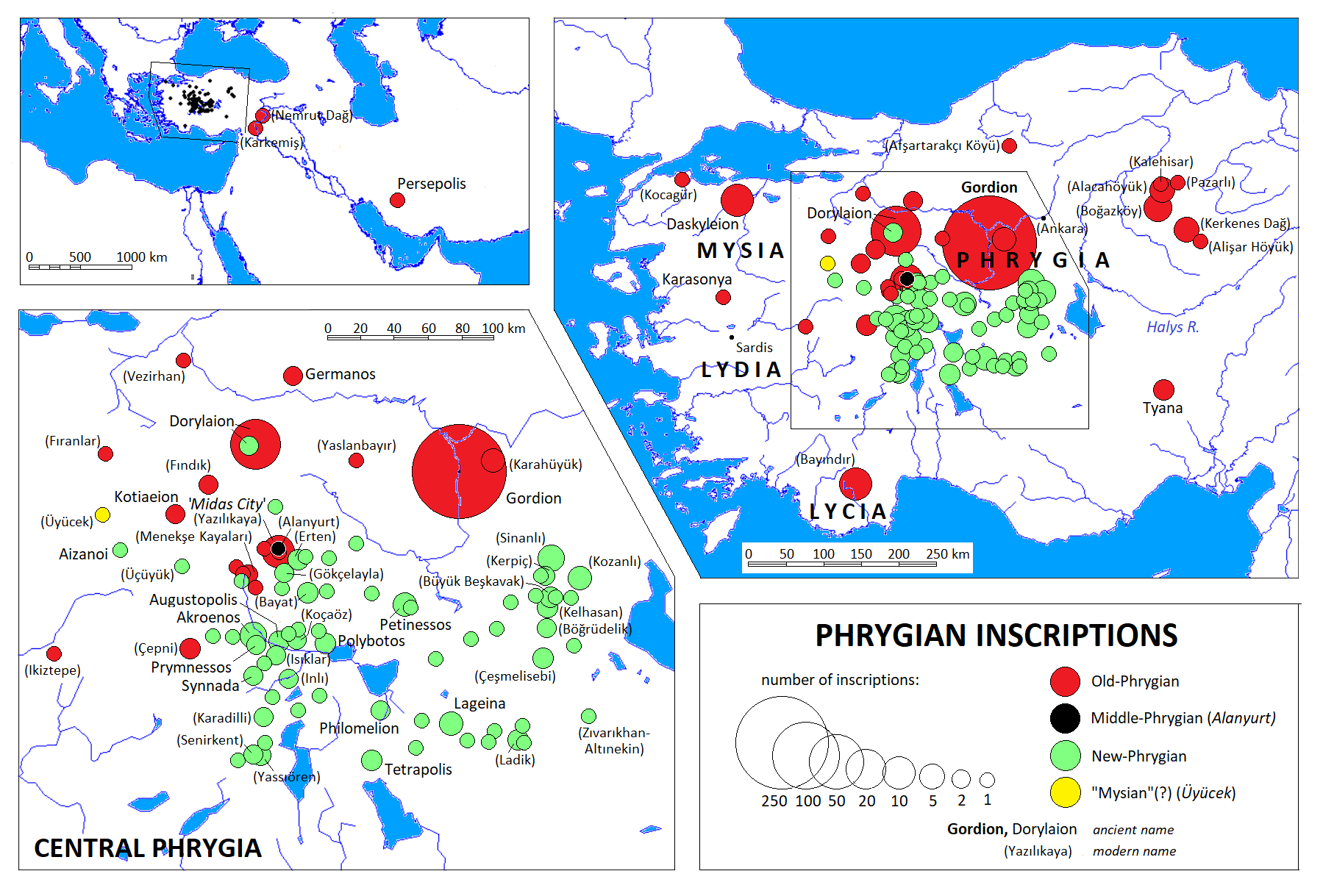
- Map showing where Phrygian inscriptions have been found

The Phrygian language (/ˈfrɪdʒ.i.ən/) was the Indo-European language of the Phrygians, spoken in Anatolia (in modern Turkey), during classical antiquity (c. 8th century BCE to 5th century CE).

Phrygian ethno-linguistic homogeneity is debatable. Ancient Greek authors used "Phrygian" as an umbrella term to describe a vast ethno-cultural complex located mainly in the central areas of Anatolia rather than a name of a single "tribe" or "people". Plato observed that some Phrygian words resembled Greek ones.

Because of the fragmentary evidence of Phrygian, its exact position within the Indo-European language family is uncertain. Phrygian shares important features mainly with Greek, but also with Armenian and Albanian. Evidence of a Thraco-Armenian separation from Phrygian and other Paleo-Balkan languages at an early stage, Phrygian's classification as a centum language, and the high frequency of phonetic, morphological, and lexical isoglosses shared with Greek, have led to a current consensus which regards Greek as the closest relative of Phrygian.

== Discovery and decipherment ==
Ancient authors like Herodotus and Hesychius have preserved a few dozen words assumed to be Phrygian, so-called glosses. In modern times the first monument with a Phrygian text, found at Ortaköy (classical Orcistus), was described in 1752. In 1800 at Yazılıkaya (classical Nakoleia) two more inscriptions were discovered. On one of them the word ΜΙΔΑΙ (Midai), 'to Midas', could be read, which prompted the idea that they were part of a building, possibly the grave, of the legendary Phrygian king Midas. Later, when Western archeologists, historians and other scholars began to travel through Anatolia to become acquainted with the geographical background of Homer's world and the New Testament, more monuments were discovered. By 1862 sixteen Phrygian inscriptions were known, among them a few Greek-Phrygian bilinguals. This allowed German scholar Andreas David Mordtmann to undertake the first serious attempt to decipher the script, though he overstressed the parallels of Phrygian to Armenian, which led to some false conclusions. After 1880, the Scottish Bible scholar William Mitchell Ramsay discovered many more inscriptions. In the 20th century, the understanding of Phrygian has increased, due to a steady flow of new texts, more reliable transcriptions, and better knowledge of the Indo-European sound change laws. The alphabet is now well-known, though minor revisions of the rarer signs of the alphabet are still possible; one sign ( = /j/, transcribed y) was only securely identified in 1969.

== Classification ==
- Balkanic
  - Armenian
  - Graeco-Albanian
    - Graeco-Phrygian
      - Greek
      - Phrygian
        (extinct)
    - Illyric
      - Messapic
        (extinct)
      - Albanian

The Palaeo-Balkanic Indo-European branch based on the chapters "Albanian" (Hyllested & Joseph 2022) and "Armenian" (Olsen & Thorsø 2022) in Olander (ed.) The Indo-European Language Family

Phrygian is a member of the Indo-European linguistic family, but because of the fragmentary evidence, its exact position within that family is uncertain. Phrygian is placed among the Palaeo-Balkan languages, either through areal contact or genetic relationship. Phrygian shares important features mainly with Greek, but also with Armenian and Albanian. Ancient Macedonian (most probably a Northwest Greek dialect), Thracian and Albanian are often regarded as being close to Phrygian, "but the relationship is too problematic for them to be useful sources for comparison; "the Thracian corpus is too short to give an overview of this language", "Macedonian is better explained as a Greek dialect than a proper language", and "Albanian is attested as late as fourteenth century".

Between the 19th and the first half of the 20th century, Phrygian was mostly considered a satem language, and thus closer to Armenian and Thracian, while today it is commonly considered to be a centum language and thus closer to Greek. The reason that in the past Phrygian had the guise of a satem language was due to two secondary processes that affected it. Namely, Phrygian merged the old labiovelar with the plain velar, and secondly, when in contact with palatal vowels /e/ and /i/, especially in initial position, some consonants became palatalized. Furthermore, Kortlandt (1988) presented common sound changes of Thracian and Armenian and their separation from Phrygian and the rest of the palaeo-Balkan languages from an early stage.

Modern consensus views Greek as the closest relative of Phrygian. Furthermore, out of 36 isoglosses collected by Obrador Cursach, Phrygian shared 34 with Greek, with 22 being exclusive between them. The last 50 years of Phrygian scholarship developed a hypothesis that proposes a proto-Graeco-Phrygian stage out of which Greek and Phrygian originated, and if Phrygian was more sufficiently attested, that stage could perhaps be reconstructed.

An alternative theory, suggested by Eric P. Hamp, is that Phrygian was most closely related to Italo-Celtic languages.

=== Isoglosses ===
Comparison with Greek, Armenian, Albanian and Indo-Iranian:

Phonetic
Phrygian features	Greek	Armenian	Albanian	Indo-Iranian	Examples
Centum treatment	Yes	No	No	No	NP γεγαριτμενος 'devoted, at the mercy of', γλουρεος 'golden'
*CRh₃C > *CRōC	Yes	No	No	No	NP γλουρεος 'golden'
Loss of sibilant /s/ at prevocalic and intervocalic positions	Yes	Yes	Yes	No	OP _egeseti 'hold, experience' < PIE *seǵ^{h}-, NP δε_ως 'god' < PIE *d^{h}h_{1}so-
"Prothetic" vowels (Note: That is, PIE initial laryngeals followed by other consonants that developed into vowels.)	Yes	Yes	Yes	No	OP onoman 'name', NP αναρ 'husband'
PIE suffix *-ih₂ > -iya	Yes	No	Yes	No	OP niptiya
PIE onset *ki̯- > s-	Yes	No	No	No	OP sin, si (demonstrative pronoun)
PIE final *-m > -n	Yes	Yes	?	No	NP δετο(υ)ν < PIE *dh_{1}tóm
*D > T (Note: Devoicing of plain PIE voiced stops into plain voiceless stops)	No	Yes	No	No	NP Τιαν 'Zeus' < PIE *diēm

Morphological (Note: Highlighted text indicates that borrowing cannot be totally ruled out.)
Phrygian features	Greek	Armenian	Albanian	Indo-Iranian	Examples
conditional conjunction PIE *éh_{2}i, *áHi	Yes	No	No	No	OP ai, ay/NP αι
e-augment	Yes	Yes	Yes	Yes	PIE *(h_{1})é-dheh_{1}-t '(s)he put', OP e-da-es, Greek ἔ-θη-κα, Armenian e-d
e-demonstrative	Yes	No	No	No	OP e-sai⸗t
*-eh₂-s masc.	Yes	No	No	No	cf. OP mekas and Sanskrit máhi
t-enlargement	Yes	No	No	No	
verbs in -e-yo-	Yes	No	No	No	
verbs in -o-yo-	Yes	No	No	No	
particle *-d^{h}n̥	Yes	No	No	No	
*d^{h}h₁s-ó-	Yes	No	No	No	
*-eu̯-/*-ēu̯-	Yes	No	No	No	
*g^{u̯h}er-mo-	Yes	Yes	Yes	No	
*g^{u̯}neh₂-ik-	Yes	Yes	No	No	
compound pronoun *h₂eu̯-to-	Yes	No	Yes	No	NP αυτος
*h₃nh₃-mn-	Yes	Yes	No	No	
*méǵh₂-s	Yes	No	No	No	
PIE *meh₁	Yes	Yes	Yes	Yes	OP me/NP με 'not'
perfect middle participle *-mh₁no-	Yes	No	No	Yes	NP γεγαριτμενος 'cursed, devoted'
OP ni(y)/NP νι	Yes	No	No	No	
*-(t)or	No	?	No	No	
-toy/-τοι	Yes	No	No	Yes	

Lexical (Note: Highlighted text indicates that borrowing cannot be totally ruled out.)
Phrygian features	Greek	Armenian	Albanian	Indo-Iranian
*b^{h}oh₂-t-/*b^{h}eh₂-t-	Yes	No	No	No
*(h₁)en-mén-	Yes	No	No	No
*ǵ^{h}l̥h₃-ró-	Yes	No	No	No
kako-	Yes	No	No	No
ken-	Yes	Yes	No	No
*koru̯-	Yes	No	No	No
*mōro-	Yes	No	No	No
*sleh₂g^{u̯}-	Yes	No	No	No

== Inscriptions ==
The Phrygian epigraphical material is divided into two distinct subcorpora, Old Phrygian (or Paleo-Phrygian) and New Phrygian (or Neo-Phrygian). These attest different stages of the Phrygian language, are written with different alphabets and upon different materials, and have different geographical distributions.

Old Phrygian is attested in 395 inscriptions in Anatolia and beyond. They were written in the Phrygian alphabet between 800 and 330 BCE. The Corpus des inscriptions paléo-phrygiennes (CIPPh) and its supplements contain most known Old Phrygian inscriptions, though a few graffiti are not included. The oldest inscriptions—from the mid-8th century BCE—have been found on silver, bronze, and alabaster objects in tumuli (grave mounds) at Gordion (Yassıhüyük, the so-called "Midas Mound") and Bayındır (East Lycia).

New Phrygian is attested in 117 funerary inscriptions, mostly curses against desecrators added after a Greek epitaph. New Phrygian was written in the Greek alphabet between the 1st and 3rd centuries CE and is restricted to the western part of ancient Phrygia, in central Anatolia. Most New Phrygian inscriptions have been lost, so they are only known through the testimony of the first compilers. New Phrygian inscriptions have been cataloged by William M. Ramsay (c. 1900) and by Obrador-Cursach (2018).

Some scholars identify a third division, Middle Phrygian, which is represented by a single inscription from Dokimeion. It is a Phrygian epitaph consisting of six hexametric verses written in eight lines, and dated to the end of the 4th century BCE, following the Macedonian conquest. It is considered the first Phrygian text to be inscribed with the Greek alphabet. Its phraseology has some echoes of an Old Phrygian epitaph from Bithynia, but it anticipates phonetic and spelling features found in New Phrygian. Three graffiti from Gordion, from the 4th to the 2nd centuries BCE, are ambiguous in terms of the alphabet used as well as their linguistic stage, and might also be considered Middle Phrygian.

Comparison between the Old and the New Phrygian subcorpora
Features	Old Phrygian	New Phrygian
Number of inscriptions	395	117
Dating	c. 800–330 BCE	Late 1st–3rd centuries CE
Alphabet	Phrygian	Greek
Word dividers	sometimes (spaces or colons)	never (continuous writing)
Writing material	Varied	Stone
Contents	Varied	Funerary
Area	Across Anatolia (and beyond)	Only central Anatolia
Archaeological context	Mainly yes	Never
Preserved	Mainly yes	Mainly no

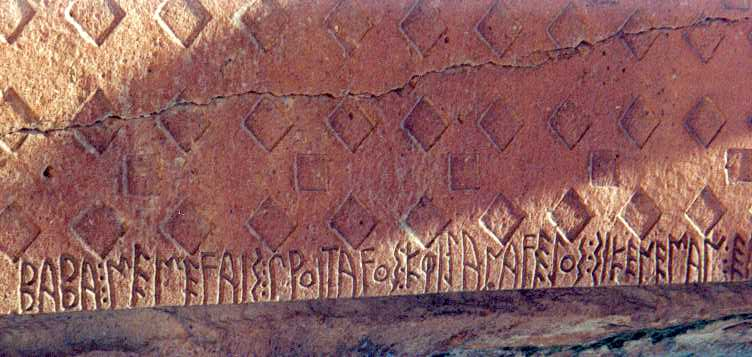
6th century BCE inscription with the Phrygian alphabet from the Midas Tomb, Midas City: ΒΑΒΑ: ΜΕΜΕϜΑΙΣ: ΠΡΟΙΤΑϜΟΣ: ΚΦΙJΑΝΑϜΕJΟΣ: ΣΙΚΕΝΕΜΑΝ: ΕΔΑΕΣ (Baba, memevais, proitavos kziyanaveyos sikeneman edaes; Baba, advisor, leader from Tyana, dedicated this niche).

The last mentions of the language date to the 5th century CE, and it was likely extinct by the 7th century CE.

== Phonology ==
	Labial	Dental	Alveolar	Palatal	Velar
Nasal	m	n			
Stop	p b	t d			k ɡ
Fricative			s		
Affricate			ts dz		
Approximant	w		l	j	
Trill			r		

It has long been claimed that Phrygian exhibits a sound change of stop consonants, similar to Grimm's Law in Germanic and, more to the point, sound laws found in Proto-Armenian; i.e., loss of aspiration in PIE aspirates, devoicing of PIE voiced stops and aspiration of voiceless stops. This hypothesis was rejected by Lejeune (1979) and Brixhe (1984) but revived by Lubotsky (2004) and Woodhouse (2006), who argue that there is evidence of a partial shift of obstruent series; i.e., loss of aspiration in PIE aspirates (*bʱ > b) and devoicing of PIE voiced stops (*d > t).

The affricates ts and dz may have developed from velars before front vowels.

== Alphabet ==
From c. 800 to 300 BCE, Phrygians used the (Old) Phrygian alphabet of nineteen letters derived from the Phoenician alphabet. This script was usually written from left to right ("dextroverse"). The signs of this script are:

sign		B	Γ	Δ	E	F	I	K				O		P		T			
variants		8		Λ				,, 𐊜,							,,			X	Φ,,
transcription	a	b	g	d	e	v	i	k	l	m	n	o	p	r	s	t	u	y	
phoneme	/a/, /a:/	/b/	/g/	/d/	/e/, /e:/	/w/	/i/, /i:/	/k/	/l/	/m/	/n/	/o/, /o:/	/p/	/r/	/s/	/t/	/u/, /u:/	/j/	/z/ /zd/?

About 15 percent of the inscriptions are written from right to left ("sinistroverse"), like Phoenician; in those cases, the signs are drawn mirrored: ... etc. instead of BΓ. ... A few dozen inscriptions are written in alternating directions (boustrophedon).

From c. 300 BCE, this script was replaced by the Greek alphabet. A single inscription dates from c. 300 BCE (sometimes called "Middle Phrygian"), all other texts are much later, from the 1st to 3rd centuries CE (New Phrygian). The Greek letters Θ, Ξ, Φ, Χ, and Ψ were rarely used—mainly for Greek names and loanwords (Κλευμαχοι, to Kleomakhos; θαλαμει, funerary chamber).

== Grammar ==
What can be recovered of the grammatical structure of Phrygian was typically Indo-European. Declensions and conjugations are strikingly similar to ancient Greek.

=== Nouns ===
Phrygian nouns belong to three genders: masculine, feminine, and neuter. Forms are singular or plural; dual forms are not known. Four cases are known: nominative, accusative, genitive, and dative.

==== Substantives ====
Nouns belong to three stem groups: o-stems, a-stems, and consonant stems ("C-stems"); the latter group also includes i- and u-stems. In addition there is a group of personal names with an e-stem.

The paradigm for nouns is as follows (to keep the paradigm clear, the many minor spelling variants, including New Phrygian ones in Greek characters, are omitted):

		a-stems		o-stems		C-stems		e-stems
		Masculine	Feminine	Masculine	Neuter	Masc./Fem.	Neuter	(Personal names)
Singular	Nominative	-a(s)	-a	-os	-un	-s, -Ø (Note: The Nominative Singular of consonant stems ends in -s for t-, d-, s-, i-, and u-stems; it ends in -Ø (without -s) for l-, m-, n-, r-, and some k-stems.)	-Ø	-es (-e)
Singular	Accusative	-an		-un (-on)	-un	-(a)n	-Ø	-in
Singular	Genitive	-as		-o (-ov)		-os		-itos
Singular	Dative	-ai (-a)		-oi (-o)		-ei		?
Plural	Nominative	-a(s) (?)		-oi	-a	-es	-a	—
Plural	Accusative	-ais		-ois (?)	-a	-ais (?)	-a	—
Plural	Genitive	?		-un		?		—
Plural	Dative	-as		-os		?		—

Examples:

- a-stem: μανκα [manka] (stele): Nom. μανκα [manka]; Acc. μανκαν [mankan]; Dat. μανκαι [mankai], μανκα, μανκης, μανκε.
- o-stem: devos ('god', cf. Greek θεός): Nom. devos; Acc. (or Gen.?) devun; Pl. Dat. δεως [deos], διως, δεος, δδεω, διος, δυως.
- C- (r-)stem: daker (meaning not clear): Nom. daker, δακαρ; Acc. dakeran; Pl. Nom. δακερης [dakeres]; Pl. Acc. dakerais.
- C- (n-)stem: ορουαν [orouan] ('keeper, protector'): Nom. ορουεναν [orouenan]; Acc. ορουαν [orouan]; Gen. ορουενος [orouenos].
- C- (k-)stem: knays ('woman, wife', cf. Greek γυνή): Nom. knays, knais; Acc. κναικαν [knaikan]; Gen. κναικος [knaikos]; Pl. Nom. knaykes.
- i-stem: *Tis ('Zeus'): Acc. Τιαν [Tian]; Dat. Τιε [Tie], Τι, Τιη, Tiei; Gen. Τιος [Tios].
- e-stem: Manes ('Manes'): Nom. Manes, Mane, Μανεις; Acc. Manin; Gen. Manitos.

==== Pronouns ====
The most frequently used pronouns are demonstrative, relative, and anaphoric. Their declensions are similar to those of nouns. Two rare pronouns, autos and tis, may be loanwords from Greek.

The demonstrative pronoun, meaning "this", has a short (ses) and a long form (semoun). Its declension:

Case	Singular			Plural		
Case	Masculine	Neuter	Feminine	Masculine	Neuter	Feminine
Nominative	ses (?)	si	σας (?)			
Accusative	sin, σεμουν	si	εσαν (?)	ses (?)		
Genitive			σας (?)			
Dative	σεμουν, σεμον, simun, ...		σα, σαι, σας, esai, σαν	σως (?)		

There is also a clitic particle variant s-, prefixed to names: sManes (this Manes).

The relative pronoun is yos ("who, whoever"). Though appearing often, only three different cases are attested. Paradigm:

Case	Singular			Plural		
Case	Masculine	Neuter	Feminine	Masculine	Neuter	Feminine
Nominative	yos, ios, ιος, ις, ...					
Accusative	ιον		ιαν			
Genitive						
Dative						

A reduplicated form yosyos ("whoever") is also known (cf. Latin quisquis).

An anaphoric pronoun is tos ("the one mentioned, this one, he"). It is often used in the standard expression ιος νι ..., τος νι ...: whoever (damages this tomb), this one (will be damned); whoever ( ...), he ( ...). Declension:

Case	Singular			Plural		
Case	Masculine	Neuter	Feminine	Masculine	Neuter	Feminine
Nominative	τος	ti			ta	
Accusative		ti	tan, ταν		ta	
Genitive	tovo					
Dative	του, το		ται, τα			

Tos has a particle variant, τι, του, -t, -τ. The particles τι and του, used after a demonstrative pronoun, or suffixed to it as -t or -τ, seem to emphasize the following noun: σεμουν του κνουμανει ("to this very tomb").

Another anaphoric pronoun is oy / ioi. It only occurs as a dative singular, oy, ιοι, οι ("to him, to her").

The emphatic pronoun autos ("the very one, the same"; cf. Greek αὐτός) can also be used anaphorically. Its composite ve(n)autos is a reflexive pronoun, meaning "himself" (Greek ἑαυτός).

Case	Singular			Plural		
Case	Masculine	Neuter	Feminine	Masculine	Neuter	Feminine
Nominative	αυτος			avtoi (?)		
Accusative	αυτον, (ven)avtun					
Genitive						
Dative	avtoi (?), αυτω		avtay, αυταη, (οε)αυται			

The indefinite pronoun kos ("somebody, something") is only attested in the nominative singular: masculine kos, κος; neuter kin, κιν. A synonym is the very rare Greek loanword tis (τις, neuter τι).

The personal or possessive pronoun only has a feminine form attested, which is va (Nom. va, ουα; Acc. ουαν, οαν; Gen. vay).

==== Adjectives ====
The declension of adjectival nouns is entirely similar to that of substantives.

Examples (note that mekas corresponds to Greek μέγας, big, great, and that -τετικμενος and γεγρειμενος parallel Greek Perfect Passive participles with reduplication and ending in -menos):

Case	Ending	mekas big, great	Ending	τιττετικμενος accursed	γεγρειμενος written
Nom. Sing. Masc.	-a(s)	mekas, μεκας	-os	τιτ(τ)ετικμενος, ...	
Acc. Sing. Masc.	-an	μεκαν	-on		γεγρειμενον
Acc. Sing. Fem.	-an	μεκαν	-an		γεγρειμεναν
Dat. Sing.	-ai (-a)	μεκα	-o (-ov) / -ai (-a)		
Nom. Pl. Masc.	-a(s) (?)		-oi	τιττετικμενοι	
Acc. Pl.	-ais	mekais (?)	-ois (?) / -ais		
Nom./Acc. Pl. Ntr.	-a (?)		-a	τιττετικμενα	
Gen. Pl. Masc./Fem.	?		-un	τιτετουκμενουν	
Dat. Pl.	-as	mekais (?)	-os / -as		

=== Verbs ===
Due to the limited textual material, the conjugation of Phrygian verbs can only be determined very incompletely. However, it is clear that it closely resembles the Ancient Greek verbal system. Three tenses are known: present, aorist (with augment and -s- infix), and perfect. Future forms have not yet been discovered. Neither has a pluperfect; a few forms may be an imperfect. There are two voices, active and mediopassive. As to mood, indicative and imperative are clearly documented, but suspected subjunctive forms and an optative (the latter with typical -oi- infix) need confirmation. Participles are present, most of them perfect passive forms with reduplication and ending in -menos. Infinitives are not known. As to person and number, most finite forms are 3rd person singular, a few 3rd person plural, and only very few 1st person singular.

Examples:

Tense	Mood	Voice	Person, number	Ending		Example	Translation
Tense	Mood	Voice	Person, number	Old Phrygian	New Phrygian	Example	Translation
present	indicative	active	1st singular	-u	(-ω)	atikraiu	I say
present	indicative	active	3rd singular	-ti, -i	-τι	poreti	he ...?
present	indicative	active	3rd plural	-n	-ν	γερεν (?)	they ...?
present	indicative	mediopassive	1st singular	-or		dakor (?)	I am put; I put/do for myself
present	indicative	mediopassive	3rd singular	-tor, -toy	-τορ, -τοι	odeketoy, αδακκιτορ	it is put; he puts/does for himself
present	subjunctive	active	3rd singular	-ti, -t	-τι, -τ	αββερετ	let him produce
present	subjunctive	active	3rd plural	-sini (?)	-σσιννι (?)	δεδασσιννι	let them put/do
present	subjunctive	mediopassive	3rd singular	-toy	-τοι, -τορ	abretoy, αββερετοι, αββερετορ	let it be produced
present	optative	active	3rd singular	-oioi, -oyoy		kakoioi	may he damage
present	imperative	active	3rd singular	-tu(v), -to	-του	ituv, ειτου	he must become
present	imperative	active	3rd plural	-nuv	-νου, -ττνου	ειττνου, ιννου	they must become
present	imperative	mediopassive	3rd singular	-do	-δου	lakedo	he must take for himself
present	participle	active		-un		torvetun	cutting wood
imperfect	indicative	active	3rd singular	-e (?), -t (?)		estat	he erected
aorist	indicative	active	3rd singular	-es	-ες	estaes, εσταες	he erected
aorist	indicative	active	3rd plural	(-saen)	-σαεν	ουρνουσαεν	they have ...ed?
aorist	indicative	mediopassive	3rd singular	-toi, -toy	-τοι	egertoi, εγερετοι	it is brought
perfect	indicative	active	3rd singular	-ti, -t, -ey (?)	-ετ, -ιτ, -εν (?)	daket, αδακετ, αδακεν	he has done, put
perfect	indicative	active	3rd plural	(-en)	-εν	δακαρεν	they have done, put
perfect	indicative	mediopassive	3rd plural	(-na) (?)	-να (?)	ενσταρνα	he has been appointed
perfect	participle	passive	masc. nom. sg.	-menos	-μενος	γεγαριτμενος	devoted to, cursed

The augment Phrygian seems to exhibit, is like Greek, Indo-Iranian, and Armenian; cf. eberet, probably corresponding to Proto-Indo-European *e-bher-e-t (Ancient Greek: épʰere with loss of the final t, Sanskrit: ábharat), although comparison to examples like ios ... addaket 'who does ... to', which is not a past tense form (perhaps subjunctive), shows that -et may be from the Proto-Indo-European (PIE) primary ending *-eti.

=== Syntax ===
Normal word order in Phrygian sentences is Subject – Object – Verb ("SOV"). However, if a direct object (DO) needs to be emphasized, it may be placed at the head of the sentence, before the subject. Part of an indirect object (IO) may be placed after the verb. Example:

S {IO, part 1} DO V {IO, part 2} ...
κος {σεμουν κνουμανει} κακουν αδδακετ {αινι μανκα} (etc.)
kos {semoun knoumanei} kakoun addaket {aini manka} (etc.)
whoever {to this tomb} harm does {or to the stele} {(he will be damned)}

The function of the several nominal cases (nominative, accusative, etc.) presents no surprises. The dative is perhaps also used as a locative. When the subject of a sentence is compounded of more than one item ("A and B and C..."), that vary in gender or number, the verb or predicate agrees in gender and number with the first item (A) (Lubotsky's rection rule). Adjectives follow their noun, except when emphasis is intended.

== Vocabulary ==
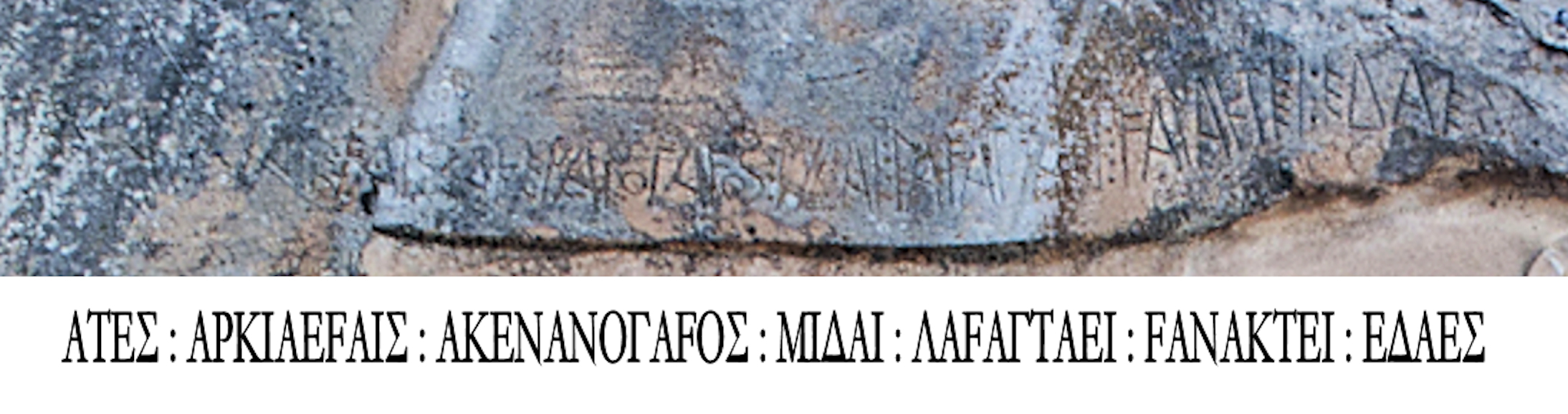
The Midas inscription over the cornice of the Midas monument. It reads Ates... Midai lavagtaei vanaktei edaes ("Ates... has dedicated [this monument) to Midas, leader of the people and ruler").

Phrygian is attested fragmentarily, known only from a comparatively small corpus of inscriptions. A few hundred Phrygian words are attested; however, the meaning and etymologies of many of these remain unknown.

A famous Phrygian word is bekos, meaning 'bread'. According to Herodotus (Histories 2.2), Pharaoh Psammetichus I wanted to determine the oldest nation and establish the world's original language. For this purpose, he ordered two children to be reared by a shepherd, forbidding him to let them hear a single word, and charging him to report the children's first utterance. After two years, the shepherd reported that on entering their chamber, the children came up to him, extending their hands, calling bekos. Upon enquiry, the pharaoh discovered that this was the Phrygian word for 'wheat bread', after which the Egyptians conceded that the Phrygian nation was older than theirs. The word bekos is also attested several times in Old Phrygian inscriptions on funerary stelae. It may be cognate to the English bake (PIE *bʰeh₃g-). Hittite, Luwian (both also influenced Phrygian morphology), Galatian and Greek (which also exhibits a high amount of isoglosses with Phrygian) all influenced Phrygian vocabulary.

According to Clement of Alexandria, the Phrygian word bedu (βέδυ) meaning 'water' (PIE *wed-) appeared in Orphic ritual.

The Greek theonym Zeus appears in Phrygian with the stem Ti- (genitive Tios = Greek Dios, from earlier *Diwos; the nominative is unattested); perhaps with the general meaning 'god, deity'. It is possible that tiveya means 'goddess'. The shift of *d to t in Phrygian and the loss of *w before o appears to be regular. Stephanus Byzantius records that according to Demosthenes, Zeus was known as Tios in Bithynia.

Another possible theonym is bago- (cf. Old Persian baga-, Proto-Slavic *bogъ "god"), attested as the accusative singular bag̣un in G-136. Lejeune identified the term as *bʰagom, in the meaning 'a gift, dedication' (PIE *bʰag- 'to apportion, give a share'). But Hesychius of Alexandria mentions a Bagaios, Phrygian Zeus (Βαγαῖος Ζεὺς Φρύγιος) and interprets the name as δοτῆρ ἑάων 'giver of good things'. Mallory and Adams agree that the word Bagaios was an epithet to the Phrygian worship of Zeus that derived from the same root.

== Phrygian poetry ==
Phrygian poetry is rare. The only examples date from after Alexander the Great's conquest of Asia Minor (334 BCE), and they probably originated in imitation of Greek metrical epitaphs. The clearest example is the so-called "Middle Phrygian" inscription mentioned above, which consists of six dactylic hexameter lines. Also, as Lubotsky has proposed, the traditional Phrygian damnation formula on grave monuments may have been slightly reformulated to fit into a two-line hexametric shape (the stress accents, or ictus, on the first syllable of each dactylus are in boldface):

ιος νι σεμουν κνουμανει κακουν αδδακετ αινι τεαμας
με ζεμελως κε δεως κε Τιη τιτετικμενος ειτου.

ios ni semoun knoumanei kakoun addaket aini teamas
me zemelōs ke deōs ke tiē titetikmenos eitou.

Whoever to this tomb harm does, or to the grave,
among humans and gods by Zeus accursed let him be.

Alliteration ('b-, b-, b-') may be intended in a peculiar clause found on two New Phrygian grave monuments from Erten (near Yazılıkaya) and Güney:

[If someone damages this grave, then ...]
... Βας ιοι βεκος με βερετ. (— pronounced, Bas ioi bekos me beret.)

... may [the god] Bas not bring him bread.

(Bas is suspected to be a Phrygian fertility god. Note that bekos is the word for 'bread' given by Herodotus, while me conforms to Greek μή, 'not', and beret is cognate with Greek φέρειν, Latin ferre, 'to bear'.)

== See also ==
- Paeonian language
- Dacian language
