= Psammetichus =

Psammetichus or Psammeticus, latinizations of Psamtik or Psametek, may refer to:

== Ancient Egyptian pharaohs of the 26th Saite Dynasty ==
- Psamtik I
- Psamtik II
- Psamtik III

== Others ==
- Psammetichus IV, a rebel during the 27th Dynasty
