= Phrygian alphabet =

Earliest writing script of the Phrygians

The Phrygian alphabet is the script used in the earliest Phrygian texts.

It dates back to the 8th century BCE and was used until the fourth century BCE ("Old Phrygian" inscriptions), after which it was replaced by the common Greek alphabet ("New Phrygian" inscriptions, 1st to 3rd century CE). The Phrygian alphabet was derived from the Phoenician alphabet and is almost identical to the early West Greek alphabets.

The alphabet consists of 19 letters – 5 vowels (a, e, i, o, u) and 14 consonants (b, g, d, v, z, y, k, l, m, n, p, r, s, t). A variant of the Phrygian alphabet was used in the inscriptions of the Mysian dialect. Words are often separated by spaces or by three or four vertically spaced points. It is usually written from left to right ("dextroverse"), but about one-sixth of the inscriptions were written from right to left ("sinistroverse"). In multi-line inscriptions there is usually a spelling of boustrophedon (a few dozen inscriptions).

== Alphabet ==
The nineteen characters of the Old Phrygian alphabet are:

Writing direction		Transcription	Phoneme	New Phrygian equivalent
ΑΒΓ⇒	ΑΒΓ⇒	Transcription	Phoneme	New Phrygian equivalent
	𐤠	a	/a/, /aː/	Α
Β, 8	B	b	/b/	Β
𐊩	𐊩	g	/ɡ/	Γ
𐊅, 𐊍	𐊍, 𐊅	d	/d/	Δ
𐊤,	,	e	/e/, /eː/	Ε, Η
F	F	v	/w/	ΟΥ
Ι	Ι	i	/i/, /iː/	Ι, ΕΙ
Κ,, 𐊵, 𐊜,	𐊜 ,𐊵 ,K	k	/k/	Κ
𐰃		l	/l/	Λ
𐌌		m	/m/	Μ
𐊪		n	/n/	Ν
Ο	Ο	o	/o/, /oː/	Ο, Ω
𐌐		p	/p/	Π
𐌛	𐌛	r	/r/	Ρ
,,,	𐰩,	s	/s/	Σ
Τ	Τ	t	/t/	Τ
𐊄	𐤰	u	/u/, /uː/	ΟΥ, O
𐰀, X	𐰁,𐰀	y	/j/	Ι
𐊁, 𐌘,, Ͳ	𐊁	z	/z/ (/zd/?)	Ζ

== See also ==
- Phrygian cap
- Gordium
- Paleo-Balkan languages
- Phrygian language
