= Lydian language =

Ancient Indo-European language

Lydian
- Maeonian
- Region: Lydia
- Ethnicity: Lydians
- Era: attested ca. 700–200 BCE
- Language family: Indo-European: Anatolian; Luwo-Lydian?; Lydian
- Writing system: Lydian alphabet

Language codes
- ISO 639-3: xld
- Glottolog: lydi1241
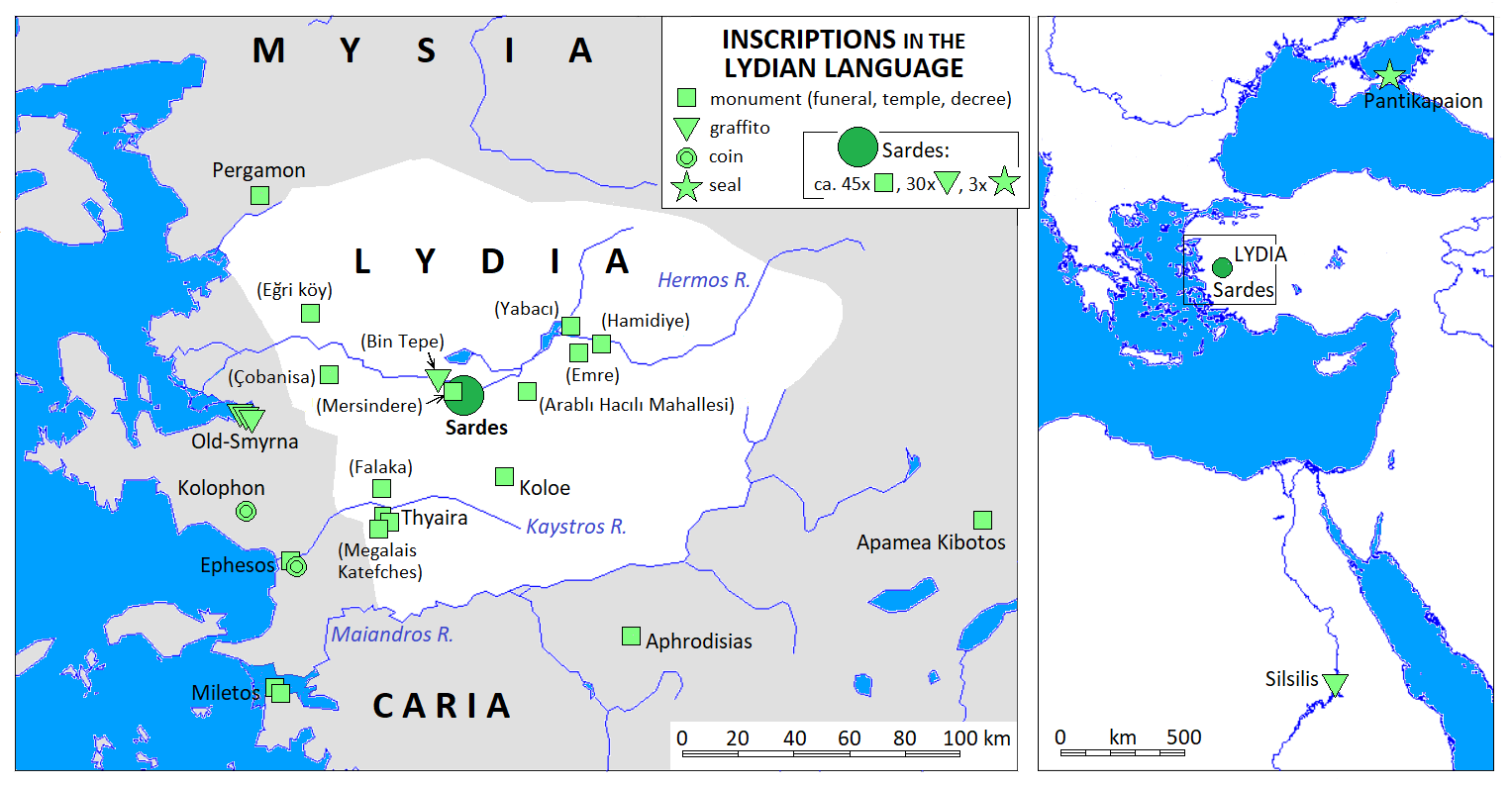
- Map showing locations where inscriptions in the Lydian language have been found.

Lydian is an extinct Indo-European Anatolian language spoken in the region of Lydia, in western Anatolia (now in Turkey). The language is attested in graffiti and in coin legends from the late 8th century or the early 7th century to the 3rd century BCE, but well-preserved inscriptions of significant length are so far limited to the 5th century and the 4th century BCE, during the period of Persian domination. Thus, Lydian texts are effectively contemporaneous with those in Lycian.

Strabo mentions that around his time (1st century BCE), the Lydian language was no longer spoken in Lydia proper but was still being spoken among the multicultural population of Kibyra (now Gölhisar) in southwestern Anatolia, by the descendants of the Lydian colonists, who had founded the city.

== Text corpus and decipherment ==
In 1916 the Sardis bilingual inscription, a bilingual inscription in Aramaic and Lydian allowed Enno Littmann to decipher the Lydian language. From an analysis of the two parallel texts, he identified the alphabetic signs, most of them correctly, established a basic vocabulary, attempted translation of a dozen unilingual texts, gave an outline of Lydian grammar, and even recognized peculiar poetical characteristics in several texts. Eight years later William Hepburn Buckler presented a collection of 51 inscriptions then known. The 109 inscriptions known by 1986 have been treated comprehensively by Roberto Gusmani; new texts are found from time to time.

All but a few of the extant Lydian texts have been found in or near Sardis, the Lydian capital, but fewer than 30 of the inscriptions consist of more than a few words or are reasonably complete. Most of the inscriptions are on marble or stone and are sepulchral in content, but several are decrees of one sort or another, and some half-dozen texts seem to be in verse, with a stress-based meter and vowel assonance at the end of the line. Tomb inscriptions include many epitaphs, which typically begin with the words 𐤤𐤮 𐤥𐤵𐤫𐤠𐤮 es wãnas ("this grave"). The short texts are mostly graffiti, coin legends, seals, potter's marks, and the like. The language of the Ionian Greek poet Hipponax (sixth century BCE, born at Ephesus) is interspersed with Lydian words, many of them from popular slang.

Lydian can be officially studied at Marburg University, Germany, within the Hittitology minor program.

== Classification ==
Within the Anatolian group, Lydian occupies a unique and problematic position. One reason is the still very limited evidence and understanding of the language. Another reason is a number of features that are not shared with any other Anatolian language. It is still not known whether those differences represent developments peculiar to pre-Lydian or the retention in Lydian of archaic features that were lost in the other Anatolian languages. Until more satisfactory knowledge becomes available, the status of Lydian within Anatolian remains unique.

== Phonology ==
=== Vowels ===
Oral vowels
	Front	Central	Back
High	i ⟨𐤦 - i⟩		u ⟨𐤰 - u⟩
Mid	e ⟨𐤤 - e⟩		o ⟨𐤬 - o⟩
Low		a ⟨𐤠 - a⟩	

Nasal vowels
	Front	Central
Mid	ẽ~æ̃ ⟨𐤶 - ẽ⟩	
Low	ẽ~æ̃ ⟨𐤶 - ẽ⟩	ã ⟨𐤵 - ã⟩

Lydian has seven vowels: 𐤠 a, 𐤤 e, 𐤦 i, 𐤬 o, 𐤰 u, 𐤵 ã, and 𐤶 ẽ, the last two being nasal vowels, typically before a (synchronic or diachronic) nasal consonant (like n, ñ or m). The vowels e, o, ã, and ẽ occur only when accented. A vowel or glide 𐤧 y appears rarely, only in the oldest inscriptions, and probably indicates an allophone of i or e that is perhaps unstressed.

Lydian is notable for its extensive consonant clusters, which resulted from the loss of word-final short vowels, together with massive syncope; there may have been an unwritten [ə] in such sequences.

=== Consonants ===
(Note: until recently the Buckler (1924) transliteration scheme was often used, which may lead to confusion. This older system wrote v, ν, s, and ś, instead of today's w (𐤥), ñ (𐤸), š (𐤳), and s (𐤮). The modern system renders the sibilants more naturally and prevents confusion between v (= w 𐤥) and the Greek nu symbol ν (= ñ 𐤸).)

Consonants
	Labial	Interdental	Alveolar	Palatal	Velar	
	Labial	Interdental	Alveolar	Palatal	plain	labial
Nasal	m ⟨𐤪 - m⟩		n ⟨𐤫 - n⟩	ɲ~ŋ ⟨𐤸 - ñ⟩		
Plosive	p~b ⟨𐤡 - p⟩		t~d ⟨𐤯 - t⟩		k~g ⟨𐤨 - k⟩ (g ⟨𐤢 - g⟩)	kʷ~gʷ ⟨𐤲 - q⟩
Affricate			ts~dz ⟨𐤹 - c⟩	tʃ ⟨𐤴 - τ⟩		
Fricative	f ⟨𐤱 - f⟩	ð ⟨𐤣 - d⟩	s ⟨𐤮 - s⟩	ʃ ⟨𐤳 - š⟩		
Liquid			l ⟨𐤩 - l⟩	ʎ ⟨𐤷 - λ⟩		
Rhotic			r ⟨𐤭 - r⟩			
Glide						w ⟨𐤥 - w⟩

Voicing was likely not distinctive in Lydian. However /p t k/ are voiced before nasals and apparently before /r/. The palatal affricate (τ) and sibilant (š) may have been palato-alveolar.

It has now been argued that the laterals l and λ are actually flaps.

The sign 𐤣 has traditionally been transliterated d and interpreted as an interdental /ð/ resulting from the sound change *i̯ > ð or the lenition of Proto-Anatolian *t. However, it has recently been argued that in all contexts d in fact represents the palatal glide /j/, previously considered absent from Lydian. An interdental /ð/ would stand as the only interdental sound in Lydian phonology, whereas a palatal interpretation of d is complemented by a full series of other palatal consonants: λ, š, ñ, and τ.

=== Stress ===
Heiner Eichner developed rules to determine which syllable in a word has the stress accent. In short, the rules are:

- Syllables with vowel -ã-, -ẽ-, -e-, -o-, -aa-, and -ii- always have stress. Syllables with -i- (-y-), -a- or -u- may be accented or unaccented.
- Enclitics (-añ-, -in-, -it-, etc.) never have stress.
- Prefixes, even those with a long vowel (ẽn-, ẽt-), do not have stress.
- An -a- before a nasal (m, n, ñ) never has stress.
- In consonant clusters syllabic liquidae (l, λ, r), nasals (m, n, ñ) and sibilants (s, š) do not have stress.
- Within a declension or conjugation stress does not move from one syllable to another.

A useful application of those rules is the investigation of metres in Lydian poetry.

== Writing system ==
The Lydian script, which is strictly alphabetic, consists of 26 signs:

sign	𐤠	𐤡	𐤢	𐤣	𐤤	𐤥	𐤦	𐤧	𐤨	𐤩	𐤪	𐤫	𐤬	𐤭	𐤮	𐤯	𐤰	𐤱	𐤲	𐤳	𐤴	𐤵	𐤶	𐤷	𐤸	𐤹
transliteration	a	p	g	d	e	w	i	y	k	l	m	n	o	r	s	t	u	f	q	š	τ	ã	ẽ	λ	ñ	c
(former transliteration)		b				v									ś					s					ν	
sound (IPA)	/a/	/p~b/	/g/	/ð/	/e:/	/w/ or /v/	/i/	/i̯~j/?	/k~ɡ/	/l/	/m/	/n/	/o:/	/r/	/s/	/t~d/	/u/	/f/ or /ɸ/	/kʷ/	/ʃ/ or /ç/	/tʃ/ or /tç/	/ãː/?	/ã/ or /æ̃/?	/ʎ/ (or /ɾʲ/?)	/ɲ/ or /ŋ/?	/ts~dz/?
Greek equivalent	Α	Β	Γ	Δ	Ε	F	Ι	(Ι)	Κ	Λ	Μ	Ν	Ο	Ρ	Σ	Τ	Υ	Φ	ϙ	-	(Ξ)	-	-	-	-	(Ζ)

The script is related to or derived from that of Greek as well as its western Anatolian neighbours, the exact relationship still remaining unclear. The direction of writing in the older texts is either from left to right or right to left. Later texts show exclusively the latter. Use of word-dividers is variable. The texts were found chiefly at the ancient capital of Sardis and include decrees and epitaphs, some of which were composed in verse; most were written during the 5th century and the 4th century BCE, but a few may have been created as early as the 7th century.

== Morphology ==
=== Nouns ===
Nouns and adjectives distinguish singular and plural forms. Words in the texts are predominantly singular. Plural forms are scarce, and a dual has not been found in Lydian. There are two genders: animate (or 'common') and inanimate (or 'neuter'). Only three cases are securely attested: nominative, accusative, and dative-locative. A genitive case seems to be present in the plural, but in the singular usually a so-called possessive is used instead, which is similar to the Luwic languages: a suffix -li is added to the root of a substantive, and thus an adjective is formed that is declined in turn. However, recently it has been defended that a form ending in -l, formerly thought to be an "endingless" variant of the possessive, was indeed a genitive singular. Of an ablative case there are only a few uncertain examples.

Nouns, adjectives, and pronomina are all declined according to a similar paradigm:

	Singular		Plural	
Case	animate	inanimate	animate	inanimate
Nominative	-š, -s	-d (-t)	-(a)š (?)	-a (?) (-añ (?), -Ø (?))
Accusative	-ñ (-n)	-d (-t)	-(a)s, -(a)š (?)	-a (?) (-añ (?), -Ø (?))
Dative-Locative	-λ		-añ (-an) (?)	
Genitive	-l (?); (Possessive:) -lis, -liñ, -lid,...		-añ (?)	
Ablative	-d (-t)		?	

==== Substantives ====
Examples of substantives:

		ciw-	astrko-	artimu-		mru-	anlola-
		= god	= patron: Lord, Lady	= Artemis		= stele	= funeral stele
Case	(animate)				(inanimate)		
Nominative Singular	-š, -s	ciwš	ast(u)rkos	artimus	-d (-t)	mrud	
Accusative Singular	-ñ (-n)	ciwñ		artimuñ	-d (-t)	mrud	
Dative-Locative Sing.	-λ		astrkoλ	artimuλ	-λ	mruλ	
Genitive Singular	-l (?)			artimul	-l (?)		
Ablative Singular	-d (-t)	ciwad (?)	astrkot (?)		-d (-t)		
Nom./Acc. Plural	-aš, -as (?)				-a (?) (-añ (?), -Ø (?))		anlola
Dative-Locative Plural	-añ (?)	ciwañ			-añ (?)		anlolañ

==== Adjectives ====
Examples of adjectives:

Case			aλa- other	wissi-, wiswi- (Note: including niwissi-, niwiswi- = 'not good: bad'.) good	ipsimši- Ephesian	sfardẽti- Sardian (Note: inhabitant of Sardis.)	pakiwali- Pakiwas's (Note: Pakiwas is a person's name.)
Nominative animate	singular	-š, -s	aλas	wissiš	ipsimšiš	sfardẽtiš	pakiwališ
Nominative animate	plural	-(a)š (?)				sfardẽnτ (Note: note that τ (/tʃ/) is written instead of t + š (/t/ + /ʃ/).)	
Nom./Acc. inanimate	singular	-d (-t)	aλad	wiswid			pakiwalid
Nom./Acc. inanimate	plural	-a (?) (-añ (?), -Ø (?))		(ni)wiswa			
Dative-Locative	singular	-λ	aλaλ	(ni)wislλ	ipsimlλ	sfardẽtλ	pakiwalλ
Dative-Locative	plural	-añ (-an) (?)	aλẽñ (?)			sfardẽtañ	
Genitive Plural		-añ (?)			ipsimñañ		

==== Pronomina ====
Examples of pronomina:

				ẽmi- my, mine	pili- his	eš- this	qi- who, which
Case				(personal)		(demonstrative)	(relative, interrogative)
Nominative	singular	animate	-š, -s	ẽmiš	piliš	ess (es, eš)	qiš (qeš, qyš)
Accusative	singular	animate	-ñ (-n)	ẽmñ	pilñ	ešñ (ešn)	qñ
Nom./Acc.	singular	inanimate	-d (-t)			ešt	qid (qed, qyd)
Nom./Acc.	plural	animate	-aš, -as (?)	ẽminaš (?)	pilinaš		
Nom./Acc.	plural	inanimate	-a (?) (-añ (?), -Ø (?))	ẽminañ (?)	pilinañ		qida (?)
Dative-Locative		singular	-λ	ẽmλ	pilλ	ešλ	qλ
Dative-Locative		plural	-añ (-an) (?)			ešñañ (?)	
Genitive		singular	-l (?)		pil		

=== Verbs ===
Just as in other Anatolian languages verbs in Lydian were conjugated in the present-future and preterite tenses with three persons singular and plural. Imperative or gerundive forms have not been found yet. Singular forms are often hard to distinguish from plural forms in the third person present active (both ending in -t/-d): the plural form seems to be in principle nasalized, but this could not always be expressed in the writing.

Lydian distinguished a mediopassive voice with the third-person singular ending -t(a)λ or -daλ (derived from Proto-Anatolian *-tori; -t(a)λ after consonant stems and part of the stems ending in a vowel, -daλ when lenited after other stems ending in a vowel or glide).

About a dozen conjugations can be distinguished, on the basis of (1) the verbal root ending (a-stems, consonant stems, -ši-stems, etc.), and (2) the endings of the third person singular being either unlenited (-t; -tλ, -taλ) or lenited (-d; -dλ, -daλ). For example, šarpta-^{(t)} (to inscribe, to carve) is an unlenited a-stem (šarptat, he inscribes), qaλmλa-^{(d)} (to be king) is a lenited a-stem (qaλmλad, he rules). Differences between the various conjugations are minor.

Many Lydian verbs are composite, using prefixes such as ẽn- (= 'in-'?), ẽt- (= 'into-'), fa-/f- ('then, subsequently, again'?), šaw-, and kat-/kaτ- (= 'down-'?), and suffixes like -ãn-/-ẽn- (durative?), -no-/-ño- (causative?), -ši- (iterative?), and -ki- or -ti- (denominative?); their meaning is often difficult to determine.

Examples of verbal conjugation:

			cẽn(š)i-^{(t)}	cuni/cñi-^{(t?)}	in(ãn)i-^{(t)}	tro-^{(d)}	u-^{(d)}	(other verbs)
		(ending)	to dedicate	to erect	to make	to hand over	to write	
Active:
Present/future	1 Singular	-u, -w	cẽnu		inãnu	(kan-)toru; (fa-kan-)trow		
Present/future	2 Singular	-š				(fa-)troš		
Present/future	3 Singular	-t, -d			int; inãnt	(kan-)trod	(ẽn-)ud	
Present/future	1 Plural	-wñ	τẽnwñ					
Present/future	2 Plural	?						
Present/future	3 Plural	~-t	cẽnit, (ši-)τẽnit			(ta-)trot		taqtula- (= ?): taqtulãt
Preterite	1 Singular	-dñ (~-ñ, -ñ)	cẽnšidñ		inãnidñ	trodñ		ca- (to give a share): (fẽn-)cãñ; ow- (to favor): owñ
Preterite	3 Singular	-l	cẽnal	(fa-)cunil, (fa-)cñil	inl, il	(ẽn-)trol	ul, (kat-)ul	
Preterite	1 Plural	-wñ				(fiš-)trowñ		
Preterite	3 Plural	-rs, -riš		(fa-)cñiriš				še- (to release): šers
Imperative		?						
Participle		-m(i)-						kipτa- (to act as a kipτa): kipτam-
Infinitive		-l			inal		ul	
Nominal derivative	(A)	-to						karf-/korf-: karfto-s (= ?)
Nominal derivative	(B)	-λo (-lo)						karf-/korf-: šaw-korfλo-s, šaw-karblo-s (= ?)
Mediopassive:
Present/future	3 Singular	-t(a)λ, -daλ	cẽntλ					išlo- (to honor?): išlodaλ
Preterite	3 Singular	-rst						pife- (to grant): piferst

=== Particles ===
To emphasize where an important next part of a sentence begins, Lydian uses a series of enclitic particles that can be affixed to a pivotal word. Examples of such "emphatic" enclitics are -in-, -it-/-iτ-, -t-/-τ-, -at-, and -m-/-um-. When stacked and combined with other suffixes (such as pronomina, or the suffix -k = 'and') veritable clusters are formed. The word ak = 'so..., so if...' provides many examples:

akτin (= ak-τ-in) - 'so...', 'so if...', 'yea, if...'
akmsin (= ak-m-s-in) - 'so if he...' (-s- = 'he'), or (= ak-ms-in) - 'so if to them...' (-ms- = 'to them')
akmλt (= ak-m-λ-t) - 'so if to him...' (-λ- = 'to him'); etc.

== Syntax ==
The basic word order is subject-object-verb, but constituents may be extraposed to the right of the verb. Like other Anatolian languages, Lydian features clause-initial particles with enclitic pronouns attached in a chain. It also has a number of preverbs and at least one postposition. Modifiers of a noun normally precede it.

== Sample text ==
=== The Lydian bilingual ===
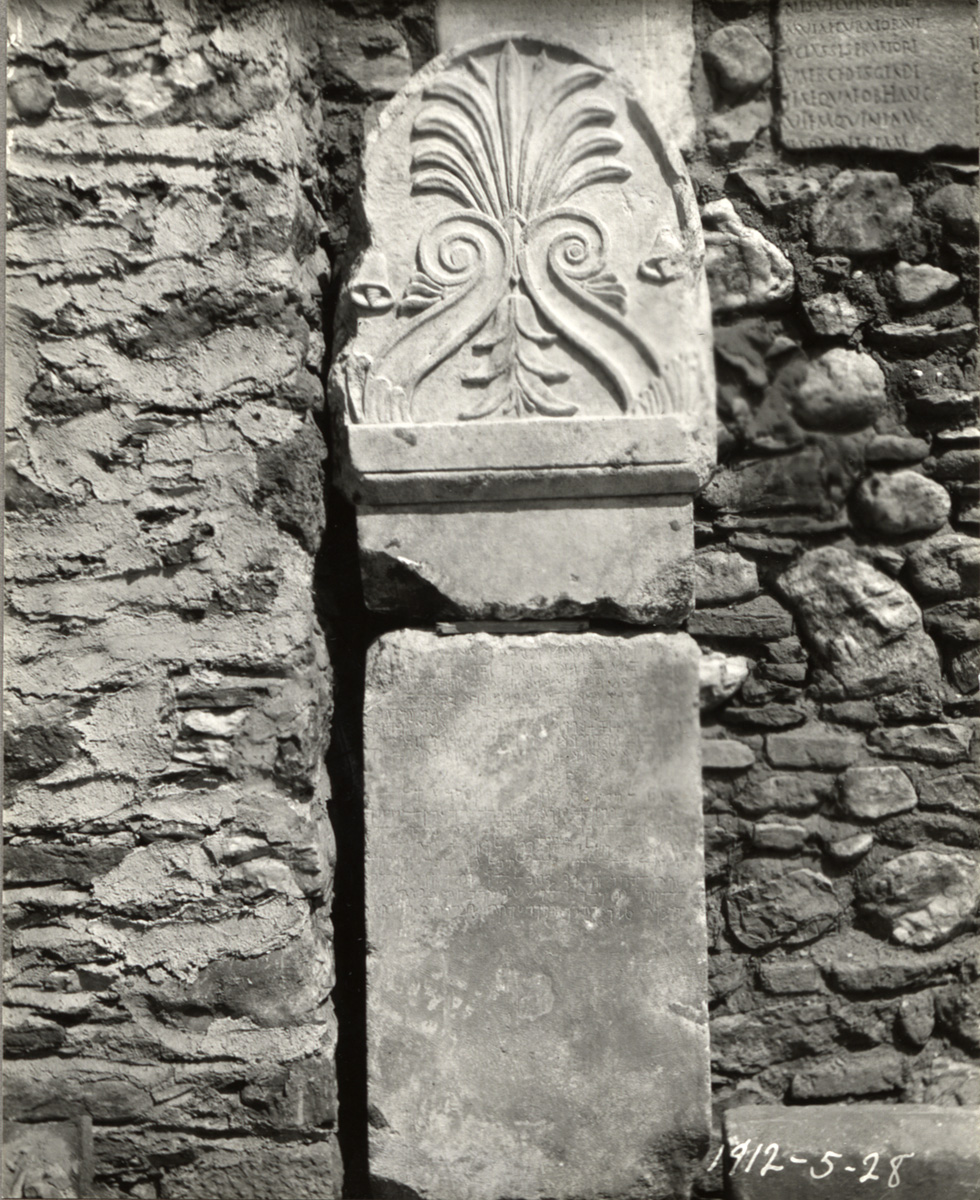
The Sardis bilingual inscription was the "Rosetta Stone" for the Lydian language.

In May 1912 American excavators at the Sardis necropolis discovered a bilingual inscription in Lydian and Aramaic. Being among the first texts found, it provided a limited equivalent of the Rosetta Stone and permitted a first understanding of the Lydian language.

The first line of the Lydian text has been destroyed, but can be reconstructed from its Aramaic counterpart.

Text	Transliteration	Reconstructed Pronunciation	Translation
...]	[...]	[...]	[In year 10 of King Artaxerxes [i.e., 395 BCE(?)] were dedicated,]
𐤬]𐤭𐤠𐤷 𐤦𐤳𐤩𐤷 𐤡𐤠𐤨𐤦𐤩𐤩𐤷 𐤤𐤳𐤯 𐤪𐤭𐤰𐤣 𐤤𐤮𐤮𐤨 [𐤥𐤠𐤫𐤠𐤮]	[o]raλ išlλ pakillλ ešt mrud ess-k [wãnas]	ɔɾaʎ iʃləʎ pakilləʎ eʃt mɾuð essək wãːnas	early in the [m]onth of Bacchus [= October–November], this stele, and this [tomb],
𐤩𐤠𐤲𐤭𐤦𐤳𐤠𐤨 𐤲𐤤𐤩𐤠𐤨 𐤨𐤰𐤣𐤨𐤦𐤯 𐤦𐤳𐤯 𐤤𐤮𐤷 𐤥𐤵𐤫[𐤠𐤷]	laqriša-k qela-k kudkit išt ešλ wãn[aλ]	lakʷɾiʃak kʷelak kuðkit iʃt eʃəʎ wãːnaʎ	and the walls/inscription, and the area opposite(?) this to[mb]
𐤡𐤷𐤯𐤠𐤭𐤥𐤬𐤣 𐤠𐤨𐤠𐤣 𐤪𐤠𐤫𐤤𐤩𐤦𐤣 𐤨𐤰𐤪𐤩𐤦𐤩𐤦𐤣 𐤳𐤦𐤩𐤰𐤨𐤠𐤩𐤦𐤣 𐤠𐤨𐤦𐤯 𐤫[𐤵𐤲𐤦𐤳]	pλtarwod ak-ad manelid kumlilid šilukalid ak-it n[ãqiš]	pʎtaɾwɔð akað manelið kumlilið ʃilukalið akit nãːkʷiʃ	belonging(?) to Manes, son of Kumlis from Silukas's clan; so if an[yone]
𐤤𐤳𐤷 𐤪𐤭𐤰𐤷 𐤡𐤰𐤨 𐤤𐤳𐤷 𐤥𐤵𐤫𐤠𐤷 𐤡𐤰𐤨 𐤤𐤳𐤸𐤠𐤸	ešλ mruλ puk ešλ wãnaλ puk ešñañ	eʃʎ mɾuʎ puk eʃʎ wãːnaʎ puk eʃɲaɲ	to this stele or this tomb or these
𐤩𐤠𐤲𐤭𐤦𐤳𐤠𐤸 𐤡𐤰𐤨𐤦𐤯 𐤨𐤰𐤣 𐤦𐤳𐤯 𐤤𐤳𐤷 𐤥𐤵𐤫𐤠𐤷 𐤡𐤷𐤯𐤠𐤭𐤥𐤬[𐤣]	laqrišañ puk-it kud išt ešλ wãnaλ pλtarwo[d]	lakʷɾiʃaɲ pukit kuð iʃt eʃʎ wãːnaʎ pʎtaɾwɔð	walls/inscription or to whatever belong[s](?) to this tomb—
𐤠𐤨𐤯𐤦𐤫 𐤫𐤵𐤲𐤦𐤳 𐤲𐤤𐤩𐤷𐤨 𐤱𐤶𐤫𐤳𐤷𐤦𐤱𐤦𐤣 𐤱𐤠𐤨𐤪𐤷 𐤠𐤭𐤯𐤦𐤪𐤰𐤮	ak-t-in nãqiš qelλ-k fẽnšλifid fak-mλ artimus	aktin nãːkʷiʃ kʷelʎək fãnʃʎifið fakməʎ aɾdimus	yea, if anyone to anything does damage, then to him Artemis
𐤦𐤡𐤮𐤦𐤪𐤳𐤦𐤳 𐤠𐤭𐤯𐤦𐤪𐤰𐤨 𐤨𐤰𐤩𐤰𐤪𐤳𐤦𐤳 𐤠𐤠𐤭𐤠𐤷 𐤡𐤦𐤭𐤠𐤷𐤨	ipsimšiš artimu-k kulumšiš aaraλ piraλ-k	ipsimʃiʃ aɾdimuk kulumʃiʃ a(ː)ɾaʎ piɾaʎk	of the Ephesians and Artemis of Coloe [will destroy] the yard and house,
𐤨𐤷𐤦𐤣𐤠𐤷 𐤨𐤬𐤱𐤰𐤷𐤨 𐤲𐤦𐤭𐤠𐤷 𐤲𐤤𐤩𐤷𐤨 𐤡𐤦𐤩𐤷 𐤥𐤹𐤡𐤠𐤲𐤶𐤫𐤯	kλidaλ kofuλ-k qiraλ qelλ-k pilλ wcpaqẽnt	kʎiðaʎ kɔfuʎk kʷiɾaʎ kʷeləʎk piləʎ w̩tspakʷãnd	land and water, property and estate that are his, She [Artemis] will destroy!

== Vocabulary ==
Examples of words in the bilingual:

𐤬𐤭𐤠 – ora – month; cf. Greek ὥρα (season, year, moment), Latin hora (hour), English hour
𐤩𐤠𐤲𐤭𐤦𐤳𐤠 – laqriša – wall, walls (traditional translation); letters, inscription (?)
𐤡𐤦𐤭𐤠 – pira – house; cf. Hitt. pēr/parn- 'house'
𐤲𐤦𐤭𐤠 – qira – field, ground, immovable property
𐤨 – -k (suffix) – and; cf. Greek τε, Latin -que = and

Other words with Indo-European roots and with modern cognates:

𐤲𐤦𐤳 – qiš – who; cf. Greek τίς, Latin quis, French qui
𐤡𐤭𐤠𐤱𐤭𐤮 – prafrs – community, brotherhood; cf. Latin frater, English brother, French frère
𐤹𐤦𐤥𐤳 – ciwš – god; cf. Greek Ζεύς, Latin deus, French dieu (god)
𐤠𐤷𐤠𐤮 – aλas – other; cf. Greek ἄλλος (other; is an element in words such as allogamy, allomorph, allopathy, allotropy), Latin alius (other), alter (another, the other one, second), French autre

Only a small fraction of the Lydian vocabulary is clearly of Indo-European stock. Gusmani provides lists of words that have been linked to Hittite, various other Indo-European languages, and Etruscan.

== Lydian poetry ==
In his seminal decipherment of Lydian texts Littmann noted that at least five of them show two poetical aspects:

- First, assonance: all lines have the same vocal (o, or a, or i) in the last syllable. One of the longest inscriptions, 19 lines, has an o in the last syllable of each line. Littmann sensationally labeled these assonances "the earliest rhyme in the history of human literature", though the word 'rhyme' is slightly misleading because the consonants in the last syllables do vary (... factot / ... tasok / ... arktoλ, etc.).
- Secondly, the poetic texts apparently show a metre: lines have twelve (sometimes eleven or ten) syllables with a caesura before the fifth or sixth syllable from the end. The twelve-syllable lines often sound like anapestic tetrameters.

Also, partly in order to achieve assonance and metre ("metri causa"), in poetic texts word order is more free than in prose.

Martin West, after comparing historical metres in various Indo-European languages, concluded that the Lydian metres seem to be compatible with reconstructed common Proto-Indo-European metres. The Lydians probably borrowed these metres from the Greeks; however, the assonance was a unique innovation of their own.

Only one text shows mixed character: a poetical middle part is sandwiched in between a prose introduction and a prose conclusion. Analogous to the bilingual text the introduction tells who built the monument (a certain Karos), and for whom (both his son and his ancestors), while the final sentence of the original inscription may be the usual curse for those who would dare to damage it. The poetic middle part seems to claim that the monument was built after consulting a divine oracle, cited between Lydian "quotation marks" ▷...▷, and continues with an appeal to pay as much respect to the builder as to the venerable forefathers.

It is remarkable that clear examples of rhyme (like the stock expression aaraλ piraλ-k, 'house and yard', cf. German 'Haus und Hof') and alliteration (kλidaλ kofuλ-k qiraλ qelλ-k, 'land and water, property and estate') are absent in the poetical texts, but do occur in the prose bilingual.

== See also ==
- Lydian script

== Sources ==
- Roberto Gusmani (1980–1986). Lydisches Wörterbuch. Mit grammatischer Skizze und Inschriftensammlung (in German). Ergänzungsband 1-3, Heidelberg.
- Gusmani, Roberto (1964). Lydisches Wörterbuch (in German). C. Winter. OCLC 582362214.
- Craig Melchert (2004). "Lydian". In Roger D. Woodard (ed.). The Cambridge Encyclopedia of the World's Ancient Languages. Cambridge University Press. pp. 601–607. ISBN 978-0-521-56256-0.
- Fortson, Benjamin W. (2004). Indo-European Language and Culture : An Introduction. Malden, Massachusetts: Blackwell Textbooks in Linguistics. ISBN 978-1-4051-0316-9.
- Gérard, Raphaël (2005). Phonétique et morphologie de la langue lydienne (in French). Louvain-la-Neuve: Peeters Publishers. ISBN 978-90-429-1574-9.
- Shevoroshkin, V. (1977). The Lydian Language. Moscow.
