= Sogdian =

Sogdian may refer to:

- anything pertaining to Sogdia / Sogdiana
- Sogdian language
- Sogdian alphabet
- Sogdian people
- Sogdian (Unicode block)

== See also ==
- Old Sogdian (Unicode block), a separate Unicode block
- Sogdian Rock, a fortress in Sogdia
