= Kokawa-dera Engi Emaki =

Japanese emakimono or emaki (painted narrative handscroll) from the 12th century

- ja: 粉河寺縁起絵巻
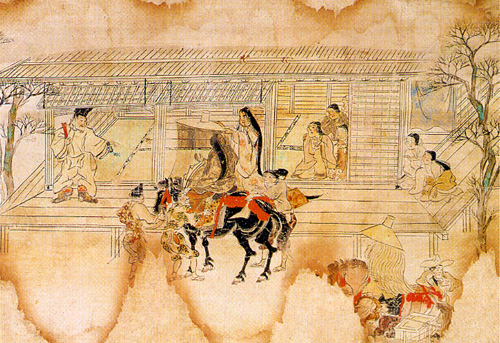
- Detail of the scroll showing a young girl on a pilgrimage riding a horse
- Artist: Unknown
- Completion date: 12th century
- Medium: Emakimono; Paint and ink on paper handscroll
- Movement: Yamato-e
- Subject: Kokawa-dera Temple
- Dimensions: 30.8 cm × 1984.2 cm (12.1 in × 781.2 in)
- Designation: National Treasure
- Location: Kyoto National Museum, Kyoto
- Owner: Kokawa-dera Temple, Kinokawa, Wakayama

The Kokawa-dera Engi Emaki (粉河寺縁起絵巻; "Illustrated handscroll of Legends of Kokawa-dera Temple"), is an emakimono or emaki (painted narrative handscroll) from the 12th century, in either the Heian or Kamakura periods of Japanese history. An illuminated manuscript composed of a single scroll of paper, it illustrates the foundation of, and the miracles associated with, the Kokawa-dera Buddhist temple in the former Kii Province (currently in Wakayama Prefecture). The long paintings in the work were executed in a simple, uncluttered, Yamato-e style typical of Japanese paintings of the time.

== Background ==
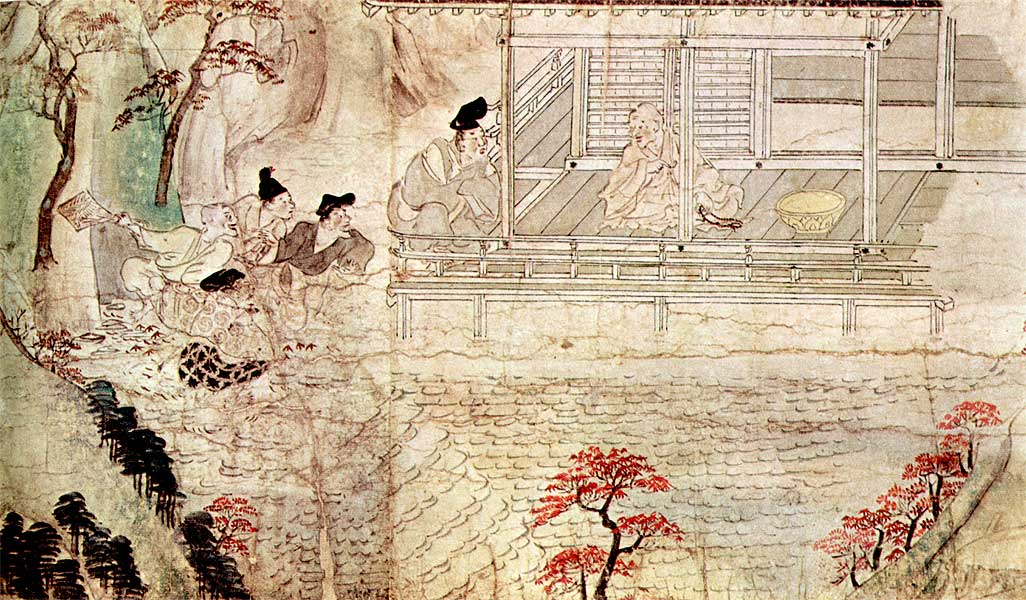
Scenes at the hunter's residence

Originating in Japan in the sixth or seventh century through trade with the Chinese Empire, emakimono art spread widely among the aristocracy in the Heian period. An emakimono consists of one or more long scrolls of paper narrating a story through Yamato-e texts and paintings. The reader discovers the story by progressively unrolling the scroll with one hand while rewinding it with the other hand, from right to left (according to the then horizontal writing direction of Japanese script), so that only a portion of text or image of about 60 cm (24 in) is visible.

The narrative assumes a series of scenes, the rhythm, composition and transitions of which are entirely determined by the artist's sensitivity and technique. The themes of the stories were very varied: illustrations of novels, historical chronicles, religious texts, biographies of famous people, humorous or fantastic anecdotes, etc. The narrative paintings, and especially the emakimono telling the story of the founding of temples or the lives of famous monks, were also fertile ground for Buddhist proselytism.

== Description ==
The Kokawa-dera Engi Emaki recounts the miraculous origins of the Kokawa-dera temple, founded in 770 according to legend, and its main figure, a statue of Kannon with a thousand arms (Senju Kannon). The origins and foundation of Buddhist temples (engi in Japanese) was a classic subject of emakimono, often with a proselytising purpose of reaching as many people as possible. The work consists of a single scroll of paper, 30.8 cm (12.1 in) high by 1,984.2 cm (781.2 in) long, organised into four short calligraphic sections and five long painting areas, but the start of the scroll (precisely the first calligraphic section and a piece of the first painting) was burned in a fire, and the remaining parts are partially damaged at the edges.

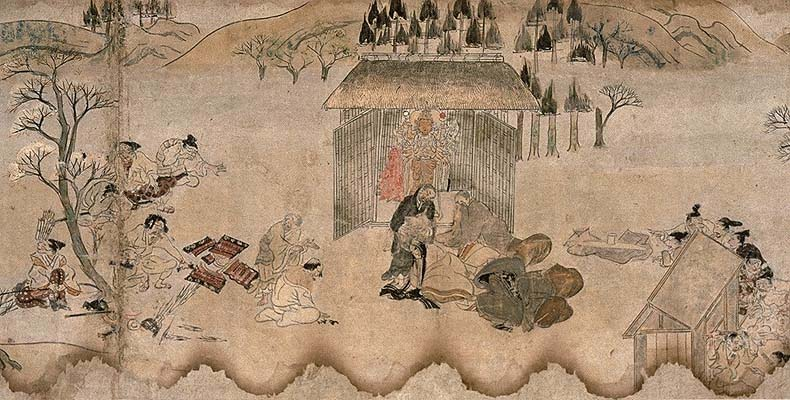
The temple and the statue of Kannon with a thousand arms

The legend related by the work is based on the two parts of the text of Kokawa-dera engi (The Legends of Kokawa-dera). The first part of the text tells the tale of a hunter named Ōtomo no Kujiko from Kii Province in the 8th century. Several nights in a row, Kannon with a thousand arms revealed himself to this hunter by a strange light, so much so that Ōtomo no Kujiko decided to build him a temple there. A young ascetic promised him to carve a statue in seven days for this sanctuary; it is the statue of Kannon from Kokawa-dera temple. The second part of the text describes a miracle associated with this statue. In legend, a young monk one day healed the sick daughter of a wealthy man with prayers. Refusing the money offered as a thank you, he only accepted a knife and a red hakama as a reward, saying he was going back to his home in Kokawa, Kii Province. The wealthy man and his family made a pilgrimage there the following year. Going up the course of the Kokawa River, they discovered the shrine and the image of Kannon with a thousand arms, adorned with the dagger and the red hakama. They then concluded the miracle by understanding that the young monk was none other than the manifestation of Kannon, and decided to devote their lives to following the path of Buddhism.

== Dating and author ==
The creation date and author of the work are unknown, but it is commonly dated to the end of the 12th century (either late in the Heian period (794–1185) or at the beginning of the Kamakura period (1185–1333)). Specialists are divided on the possible existence of an older version or a study.

== Style and composition ==
The paintings in the emakimono are in the Yamato-e style, ie in accordance with the Japanese approach to painting that developed during the Heian period by deviating from Chinese canons. The work also belongs to the otoko-e subgenre, which is characterized by dynamic paintings with light color and continuous narrative rhythm, as opposed to the paintings of the onna-e (Court-style) subgenre, which are more decorative and emotional. There are few other extant examples of otoko-e works dating from the 12th century, but they include the Shigisan Engi Emaki, the Ban Dainagon Ekotoba and the Kibi Daijin Nittō Emaki. It is highly probable that these works from the end of the 12th century are relatively contemporary in relation to each other; Glum puts forward the hypothesis, from an analysis of the styles of each scroll, that the Kokawa-dera Engi would be subsequent to the Kibi Daijin and prior to the Shigisan Engi and the Ban Dainagon.

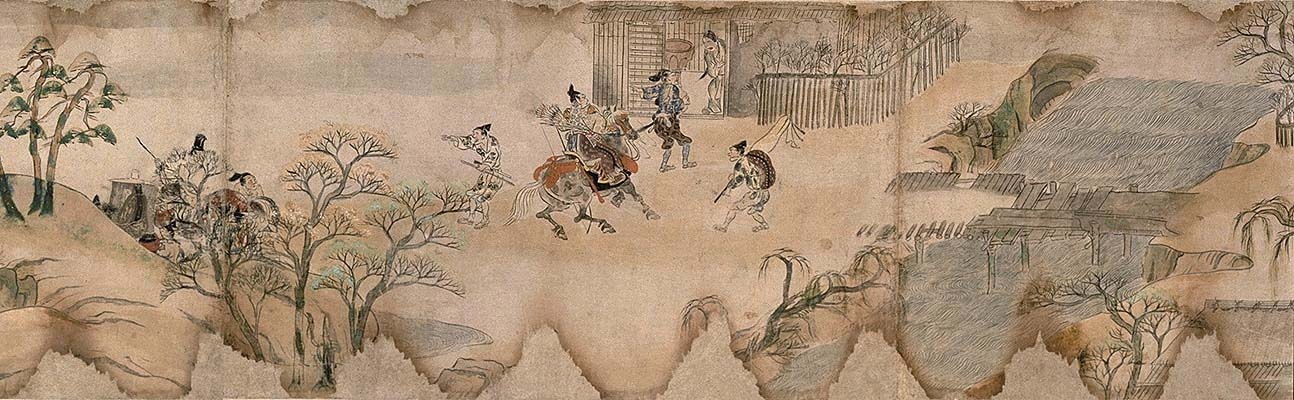
Rural and landscape scene

The paintings also observe a regular composition in three planes: a natural foreground (rocks, trees) serving to create depth in the scene; the figures and landscape elements (buildings, roads, fields, etc.) of the story occupying the entire center; and finally a distant and stylized landscape at the top of scroll. This composition is inspired by the canons of Chinese art of the Tang dynasty with typically Japanese variations. The unrealistic perspective is classically based on parallel lines and the point of view is always the same, slightly elevated at the front. On the other hand, the lines and outlines in ink are finer and less free than in the other otoko-e works. Here, the lines are characterized by their simplicity; landscape elements are stylised and used mainly to mark transitions between scenes. The narration is based on the repetition of scenes, fundamentally almost unchanged like the representation of the temple or the hunter's hut, in order to illustrate a succession of consecutive events.

The figures in the paintings present some peculiarities, as they are more realistic and neutral than the other emakimono of the time, such as the highly stylised Court paintings, or the Shigisan Engi Emaki and the Ban Dainagon Ekotoba, which are a little more expressive and caricatural.

== Historiographical value ==
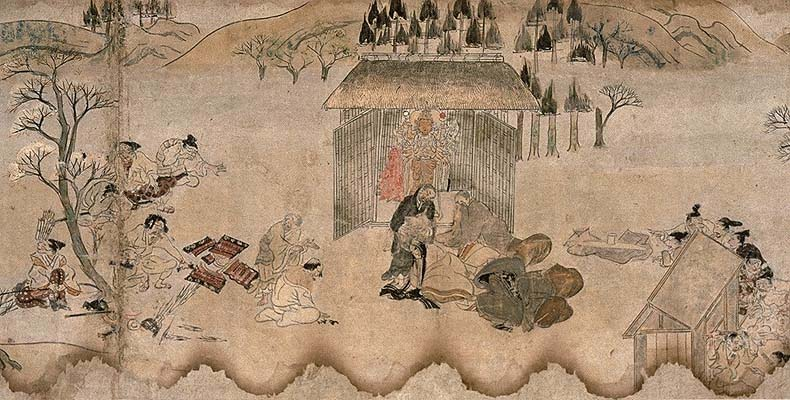
Veneration of the statue of Kannon

A mirror of society, emakimono are an important source of information on the civilisation and medieval history of Japan. This particular emakimono accurately illustrates the daily life of the Japanese at the very beginning of the Kamakura period, especially in its portrayal of ordinary people and local warriors. Like the Shigisan Engi Emaki, the Kokawa-dera Engi Emaki does not show life at Court, but life outside the Palace, another characteristic feature of works of the otoko-e genre. A study by Kanagawa University presents in detail the elements of daily life illustrated by the five paintings of the scroll, including residences, clothing, activities and works, trips, food, amenities such as bridges, and also the temple.

== Provenance ==
The emakimono has been owned for centuries, and is still owned, by the Kokawa-dera temple. Today it is listed in the Register of National Treasures of Japan, and is exhibited at the Kyoto National Museum.

== See also ==
- List of National Treasures of Japan (paintings)
- National Treasure (Japan)
