= Kibi Daijin Nittō Emaki =

- 吉備大臣入唐絵巻 (Japanese)
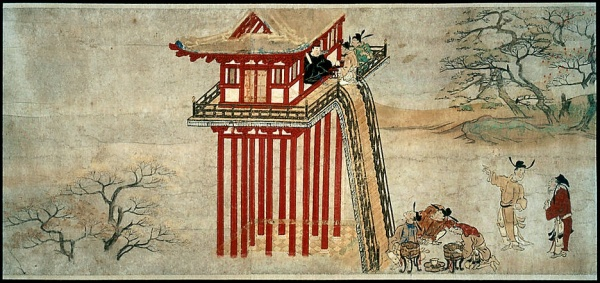
- The tower where the Japanese minister Kibi no Makibi was held in China; it is reproduced at the beginning of each section of the work
- Artist: Unknown
- Completion date: End of the 12th century
- Medium: Emakimono; Paint and ink on paper handscroll
- Movement: Yamato-e
- Subject: Kibi no Makibi
- Dimensions: 32 cm × 2440.8 cm (13 in × 960.9 in)
- Location: Museum of Fine Arts, Boston

The Kibi Daijin Nittō Emaki (吉備大臣入唐絵巻; "Scroll of Minister Kibi's Adventures in China") is an emakimono or emaki (painted narrative handscroll) from the end of the 12th century, in either the Heian or Kamakura periods of Japanese history. An illuminated manuscript, it was originally made up of a long paper scroll decorated with paint and calligraphy, and is now separated into four parts, all of which are held by the Museum of Fine Arts, Boston. It recounts the legend associated with the voyage of the Japanese Minister Kibi no Makibi to Imperial China of the Tang dynasty in the 8th century.

== Background ==
Originating in Japan in the sixth or seventh century through trade with the Chinese Empire, emakimono art spread widely among the aristocracy in the Heian period. An emakimono consists of one or more long scrolls of paper narrating a story through Yamato-e texts and paintings. The reader discovers the story by progressively unrolling the scroll with one hand while rewinding it with the other hand, from right to left (according to the then horizontal writing direction of Japanese script), so that only a portion of text or image of about 60 cm (24 in) is visible. The narrative assumes a series of scenes, the rhythm, composition and transitions of which are entirely the artist's sensitivity and technique. The themes of the stories were very varied: illustrations of novels, historical chronicles, religious texts, biographies of famous people, humorous or fantastic anecdotes, etc.

== Description ==
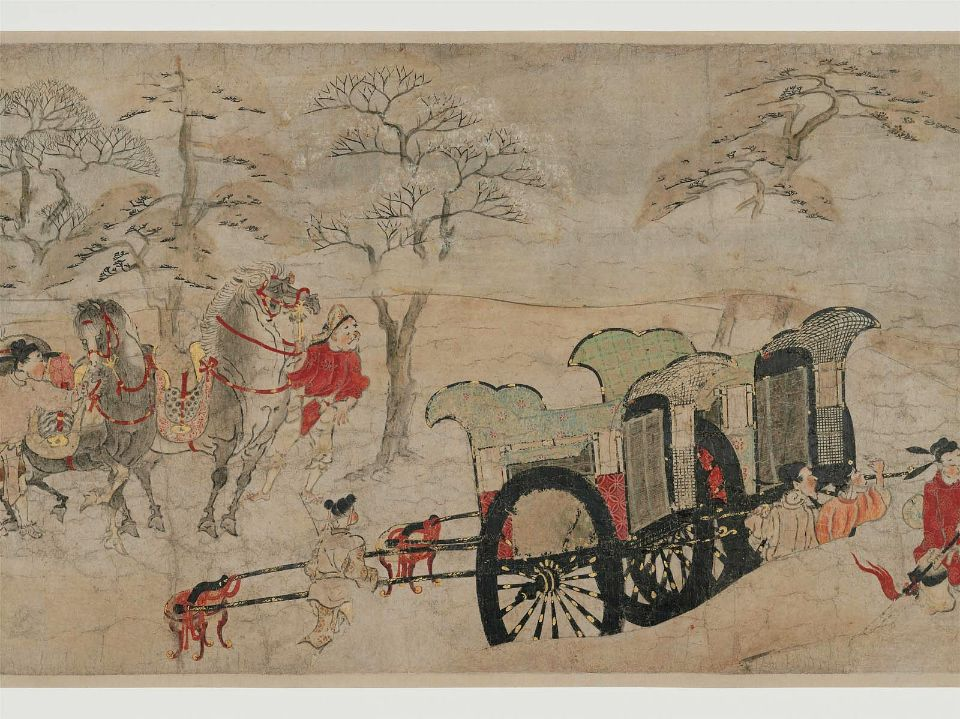
Chariots of Chinese officials leading Kibi to the Imperial Palace upon his arrival in China

The Kibi Daijin Nittō Emaki originally consisted of a single scroll 32 cm (13 in) high by 2,440.8 cm (960.9 in) long, the longest single scroll ever known, before being separated into four parts. It dates from the second half of the 12th century (end of the Heian period (794–1185) or early Kamakura period (1185–1333)), when a renewed interest in the narrative subjects and life of the people was reflected in the topics of contemporary emakimono.

The main character in the work is Japanese Minister Kibi no Makibi (693–775), whose diplomatic trips to the powerful Tang court in China have inspired legendary chronicles. The emakimono takes as its theme an episode from these legends: the adventures of Kibi while staying at the Chinese Imperial Palace, where Chinese intellectuals and nobles wanted to put his wisdom and intelligence to the test. Secluded in a tower, Kibi had to accomplish three tasks: write an exegesis of a voluminous Chinese anthology, win a game of Go, and provide a commentary on a sophisticated and tortuous poem. The Minister managed to pass all of the tests, with the help of Japanese deities.

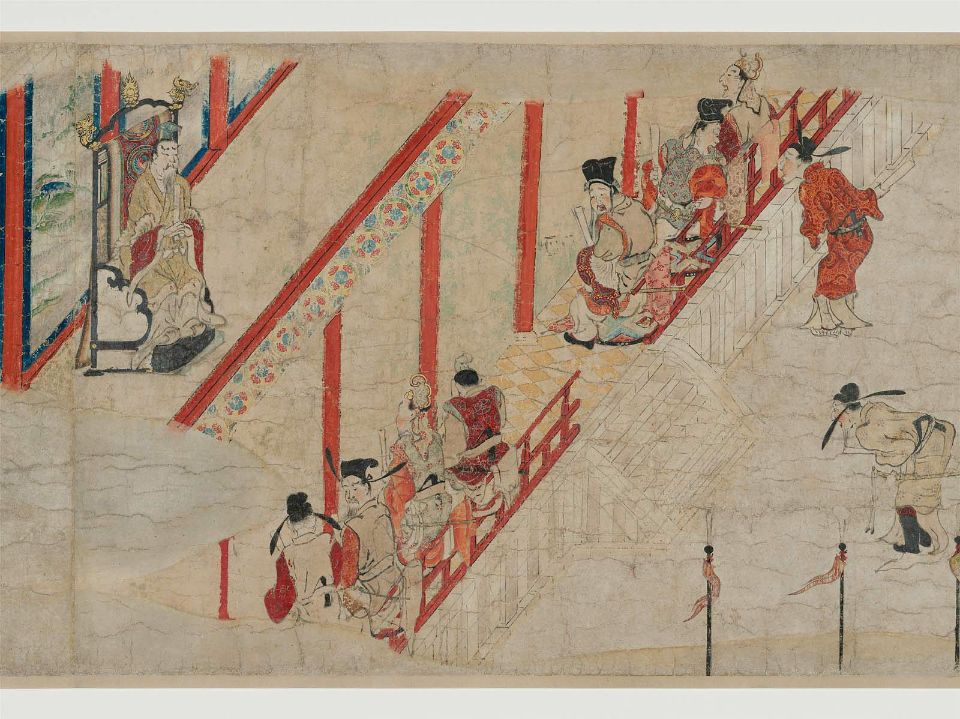
Image of the Tang dynasty Imperial Palace used to divide the work into sections

The scroll is divided into six sections, each including text and illustrations:

1. The introductory text of the work is lost, but the image shows Kibi's arrival by boat in China. There, a group of Chinese officials is waiting to take him to the palace, where he will be held in a tower.
2. A demon (oni), who is none other than the ghost (rei) of Abe no Nakamaro, manages by trickery to enter the tower to offer Kibi his help, revealing his true identity.
3. A Chinese official submits to Kibi his first test, writing the exegesis of the famous Chinese anthology of poetry and literature entitled Wen Xuan. The demon then summarises the work to Kibi and takes him to the palace to attend a conference on the text.
4. Kibi writes his exegesis on the backs of calendars. A Chinese scholar comes to test Kibi's knowledge of the text, but cannot fault it.
5. Court officials hold a meeting, at which they plan to kill Kibi if he loses in the second event: the game of Go. The demon warns the Minister of these sinister plans and teaches him the basics of the game.
6. A Go master comes to challenge Kibi who manages to win by swallowing a coin. Suspicious, the master forces Kibi to take a purgative, but the latter conceals the coin using magic.

Although the scroll ends at the conclusion of this second test, the text of Gōdanshō (1104–1108), a classic of Japanese literature, allows us to know the end of the story: after Kibi's success, thanks to the supernatural intervention of a spider, in the final test of providing a commentary on a poem, the Chinese decide to lock him up until he dies. Kibi, with the help of the demon, then makes the Chinese sun and moon disappear, forcing the terrified Imperial court to give him back his freedom. It is likely that a second scroll narrating the end of the legend originally existed, or was part of later versions.

== Style and composition ==
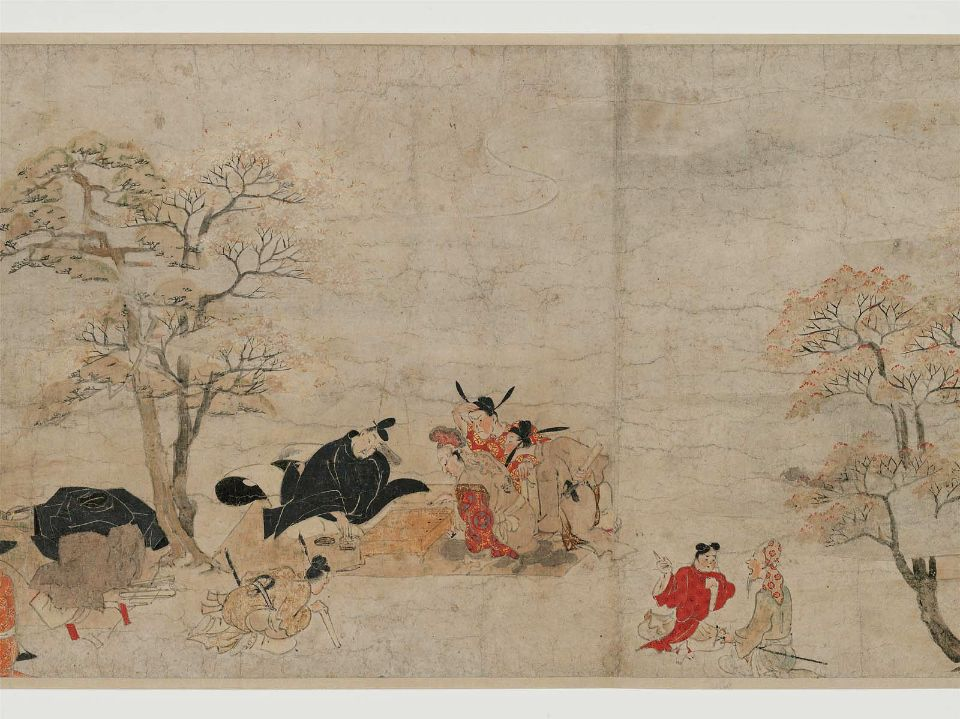
The game of Go, the second task that Kibi had to accomplish

The Kibi Daijin Nittō Emaki, like all emakimono of its time, was created in the then fashionable Yamato-e style of Japanese painting. It is similar in style to the Ban Dainagon Ekotoba, which dates from around the same time, and is attributed to Tokiwa Mitsunaga; that work has brilliant colours used for costumes and accessories, but is in a more realistic than poetic tone.

Mitsunaga was a late Heian and early Kamakura period Yamato-e master: the records, and also the similarities in pictorial style, suggest that he was also the author of the Kibi Daijin Nittō Emaki, but that hypothesis is questionable according to art historians, because of the stylistic variations and the artistic superiority of the Ban Dainagon Ekotoba. Rather, the artist was probably a painter from the capital Kyoto and contemporary of Mitsunaga.

The composition of the Kibi Daijin Nittō Emaki is based on repetition in the six scenes of the same easily identifiable decoration: the tower, the Imperial Palace and the palace gate. This is the simplest approach to suggest the temporal evolution of a story in narrative paintings, used in older works like the Kokawa-dera Engi Emaki. Perspective is rendered in a cavalier unrealistic manner, with long diagonals, while no landscape appears, except trees that decrease in size as they approach the horizon.

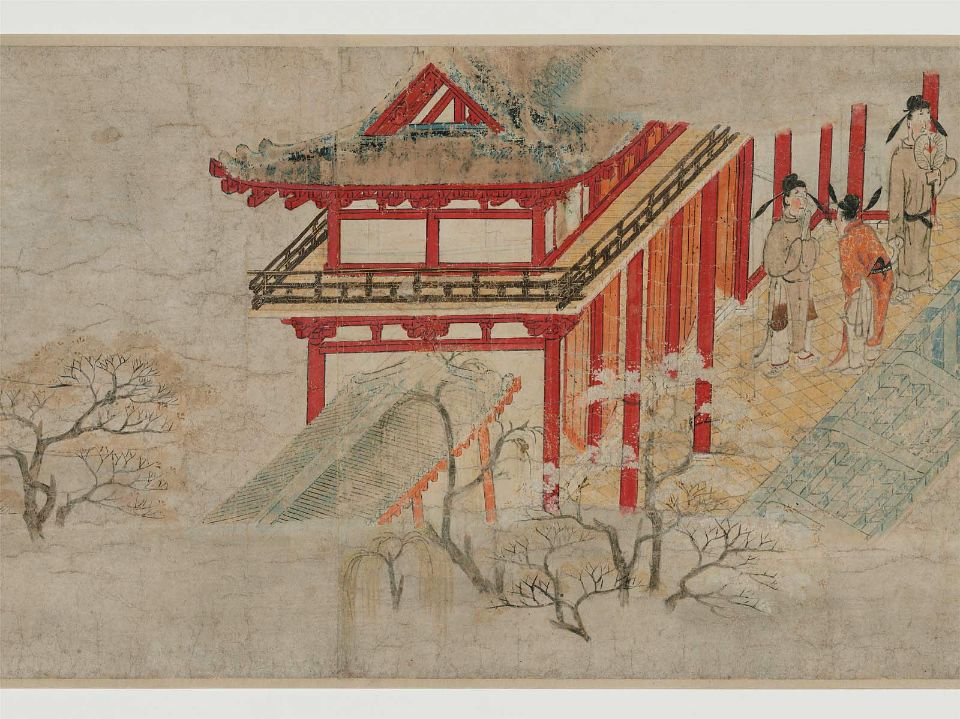
Great gate of the Imperial Palace

The very colourful, predominantly red paintings were realised using the tsukuri-e technique: first, a sketch of the outlines was done, then the opaque colour was added en aplat, and finally the outlines and small details were redrawn in ink over the paint.

The artist seems to have had limited knowledge of the ancient Tang dynasty China, where the story takes place: rather the work is inspired by Japanese Buddhist paintings of the 11th and 12th centuries, usually based on Chinese models.

The faces of the Chinese people in the work are very expressive, almost caricatural, but not very individualised. Kibi, for his part, is painted in a manner close to hikime kagibana: a white and expressionless face with a few features for the eyes, nose and mouth, a refined method in vogue in the works of the aristocrats of the Imperial Court such as the Genji Monogatari Emaki, here modified in relation to some details such as the moustache and the eyelids.

== Historiographical value ==
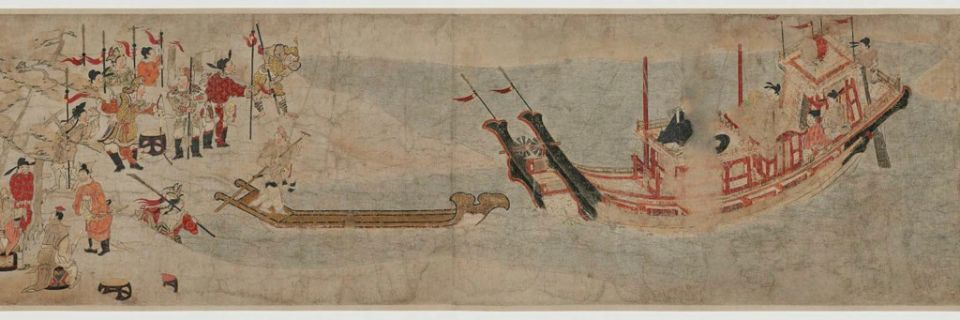
Kibi's arrival by boat in China, bringing valuable gifts from Japan

The people of Japan are always represented in emakimono, which therefore constitute valuable historical documents on the daily life, landscapes and culture of the Japanese archipelago. In the Kibi Daijin Nittō Emaki, Tang dynasty China, where the story takes place, is not painted with great precision, but several Japanese elements, in particular the boat used by Kibi and the dishes he brought from Japan as a diplomatic gift, are much more detailed. The paintings in the work also depict the game of Go, which has existed for millennia in Asia, as it was practised at the time of the work's creation, and that has actually changed very little since then. The introduction of Go to Japan is also sometimes attributed to Kibi.

Historically, the two oldest surviving texts on Kibi's legendary chronicles are the Gōdanshō and the calligraphies of the Kibi Daijin Nittō Emaki.

== Provenance ==
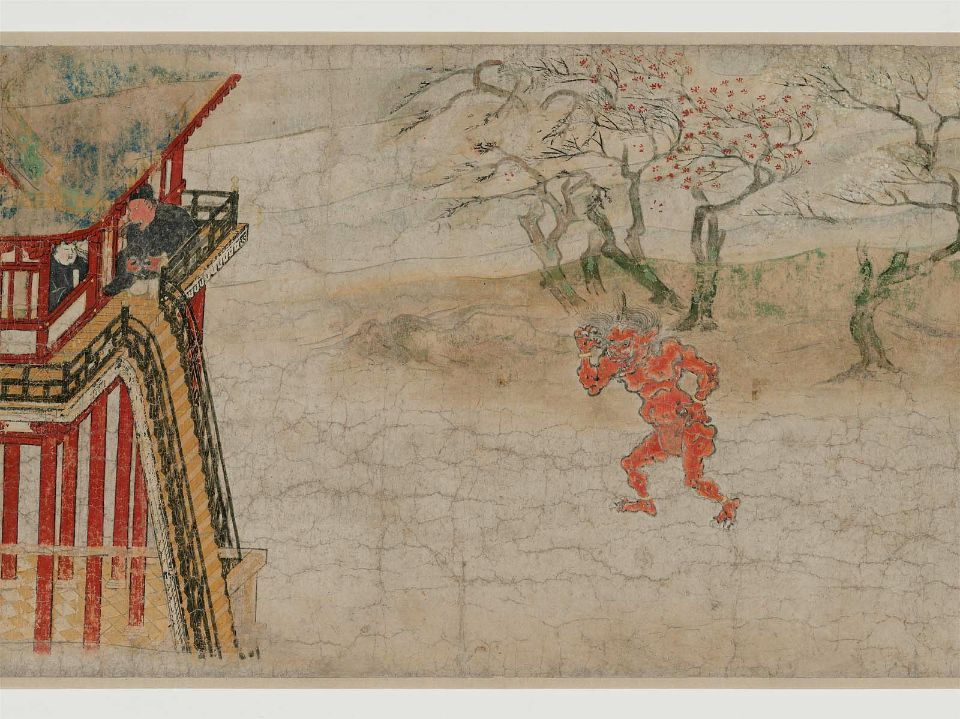
Ghost of Abe no Nakamaro in the form of a demon going to meet Kibi, detained in his tower, to help him pass the trials of the Chinese

For a long time, the Kibi Daijin Nittō Emaki, together with, notably, the Ban Dainagon Ekotoba, belonged to a Shinto shrine dedicated to Hachiman (Hachiman-gū) in the former province of Wakasa, before being acquired by the Sakai clan. In 1923, Sakai Tadatae sold the work to Toda Yashichi II, who in turn sold it in 1932 to the Museum of Fine Arts, Boston, through an expert from the museum, Kōjirō Tomita. This overseas sale provoked outrage in Japan, prompting the government to amend legislation to limit or ban the export of important artistic objects from the country.

Today, very few original works from the primitive and classical Yamato-e period remain. However, the Tokyo National Museum has a copy of the Kibi Daijin Nittō Emaki made by Yamana Tsurayoshi (1836–1902).

== See also ==
- List of National Treasures of Japan (paintings)
- National Treasure (Japan)
