= Sogdian alphabet =

Alphabet for use with the Sogdian language of central Asia

Sogdian *s{əγ}ʷδī́k ᵊzβā́k, *s{əγ}ʷδyā́u̯, 𐼑𐼇𐼄𐼌𐼊𐼋 [*𐼀𐼈𐼂𐼀𐼋] swγδyk [*ʾzβʾk] 𐼼𐼴𐼶𐼹𐼷𐼸 (𐼰𐼵𐼱𐼰𐼸) swγδyk (ʾzβʾk) 𐼼𐼲𐼴𐼹𐼷𐼰𐼴 sγwδyʾw 𐫘𐫇𐫄𐫔𐫏𐫀𐫇 swγδyʾw
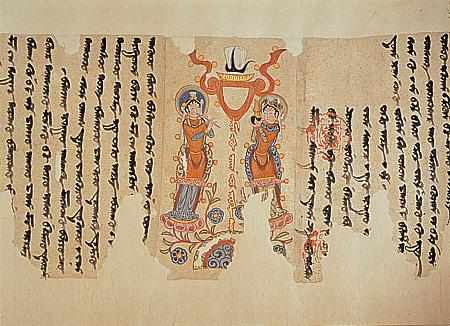
- Manichaean letter in the Sogdian language and alphabet
- Script type: Abjad
- Period: 2nd–12th centuries
- Direction: Horizontal and vertical writing in East Asian scripts, vertical writing Vertical (left-to-right); Horizontal (right-to-left)
- Languages: Sogdian

Related scripts
- Parent systems: Egyptian hieroglyphs: Proto-Sinaitic; Phoenician; Aramaic; Syriac; Sogdian
- Child systems: Old Turkic; Old Hungarian; Old Uyghur; Mongolian

ISO 15924
- ISO 15924: Sogd (141), Sogdian (Sogdian); Sogo (142) (Old Sogdian)

Unicode
- Unicode alias: Sogdian
- Unicode range: U+10F00–U+10F2F Old Sogdian; U+10F30–U+10F6F Sogdian

The Sogdian alphabet was the script originally used for the Sogdian language, a language in the Iranian family used by the people of Sogdia. The Sogdian alphabet is one of three scripts used to write the Sogdian language, the others being the Manichaean alphabet and the Syriac alphabet. It was used throughout Central Asia, from the edge of Iran in the west, to China in the east, from c. 100 to c. 1200 AD.

== Structure ==
Like the writing systems from which it is descended, the Sogdian writing system can be described as an abjad, but it also displays tendencies towards an alphabet. The script consists of 17 consonants, many of which have alternative forms for initial, middle, and final position. As in the Aramaic alphabet, long vowels were commonly written with matres lectionis, the consonants aleph, yodh and waw. However, unlike Aramaic and most abjads, these consonant signs would also sometimes serve to express the short vowels (which could also sometimes be left unexpressed as in the parent systems). To disambiguate long vowels from short ones, an additional aleph could be written before the sign denoting the long vowel. The alphabet also includes several diacritics, which were used inconsistently. It is written from right to left, but by the time it had evolved into its child system, the Old Uyghur alphabet, it had been rotated 90 degrees, written vertically in columns from left to right. Voiced and voiceless fricatives are consistently not distinguished in the script.

Aramaic logograms also appear in the script, remnants of adapting the Aramaic alphabet to the Sogdian language. These logograms are used mainly for functional words such as pronouns, articles, prepositions, and conjunctions.

== Letters ==
Early letters			Later letters	Phoneme	IPA	Corresponding letter in		
Early letters			Later letters	Phoneme	IPA	Phoenician	Aramaic	Syriac
𐼀		𐼁 (final)	𐼰	ʾ	[a], [aː], [ə], [ɛ], [ɨ]	𐤀	𐡀	ܐ
𐼂		𐼃 (final)	𐼱	β	[β], [f], [v]	𐤁	𐡁	ܒ
𐼄			𐼲	γ	[ɣ], [x], [q]	𐤂	𐡂	ܓ
𐼅		𐼆 (final)	𐼳	h	final [a], [aː], or ∅	𐤄	𐡄	ܗ
𐼇			𐼴	w	[o], [oː], [u], [uː], [w]	𐤅	𐡅	ܘ
𐼈			𐼵	z	[z], [ʒ]	𐤆	𐡆	ܙ
𐼉			𐼶	x	[x]	𐤇	𐡇	ܚ
𐼊			𐼷	y	[e], [eː], [i] , [iː], [j]	𐤉	𐡉	ܝ
𐼋			𐼸	k	[g], [k]	𐤊	𐡊	ܟ
𐼌			𐼹	δ	[ð], [θ]	𐤋	𐡋	ܠ
𐼍			𐼺	m	[m]	𐤌	𐡌	ܡ
𐼎	𐼏 (final)	𐼐 (final with vertical tail)	𐼻	n	[n]	𐤍	𐡍	ܢ
𐼑			𐼼	s	[s]	𐤎	𐡎	ܣ
𐼒		𐼓	𐼽	ʿ	[ʕ]	𐤏	𐡏	ܥ
𐼔			𐼾	p	[b], [p]	𐤐	𐡐	ܦ
𐼕	𐼖 (final)	𐼗 (final with vertical tail)	𐼿	c	[t͡ʃ], [d͡ʒ], [t͡s]	𐤑	𐡑	ܨ
𐼘			𐽀	r	[r]	𐤓	𐡓	ܪ
𐼙			𐽁	š	[ʃ]	𐤔	𐡔	ܫ
𐼚	𐼛 (final)	𐼜 (final with vertical tail)	𐽂	t	[t], [d]	𐤕	𐡕	ܬ
			𐽃	f(?)	[f](?)			ܭ
			𐽄	l	[l]			
			𐽅	š	[ʃ]			ܫ

== Varieties ==
Three main varieties of the Sogdian alphabet developed over time: Early Sogdian, a Hindu-Buddhist archaic non-cursive type; the sutra script, a calligraphic script used in Sogdian Buddhist scriptures; and the so-called "Uyghur" cursive script (not to be confused with the Old Uyghur alphabet). Early Sogdian dates to the early fourth century C.E., and is characterized by distinct, separated graphemes. The sutra script appears around 500 C.E., while the cursive script develops approximately a century later. The cursive script is thus named because its letters are connected with a base line. Since many letters in the cursive script are extremely similar in form, to the point of being indistinguishable, it is the most difficult to read of the three varieties. As the Sogdian alphabet became more cursive and more stylized, some letters became more difficult to distinguish, or were distinguished only in final position, e.g. n and z.

== Source materials ==
The Sogdian script is known from religious texts of Buddhism, Manichaeism, and Christianity, as well as from secular sources such as letters, coins, and legal documents. The oldest known Sogdian documents are 5 letters known as the Ancient Letters, found in 1907 by Sir Aurel Stein in a watchtower near Dunhuang, China. These letters date to approximately 312–313 C.E. and are written in Early Sogdian.

The Sogdian Buddhist texts, written in the sutra script, are younger, dating to approximately the sixth to eighth or ninth century. They were found during the first two decades of the twentieth century in one of the caves of the Thousand Buddhas in the Chinese province of Gansu. The bulk of these manuscripts reside in the British Library, the Bibliothèque nationale de France, and the Russian Academy of Sciences.

Another important discovery was of the Mug Documents in 1933 by Soviet scholars. These documents were found in the remains of a fortress on Mount Mug in northern Tajikistan. The documents, numbering over 76, were written on many different types of materials, such as paper, silk, wood, and skin. According to the dates on the documents, they date to the eighth century C.E. The majority of them were written using the Sogdian cursive script.

== Child writing systems ==
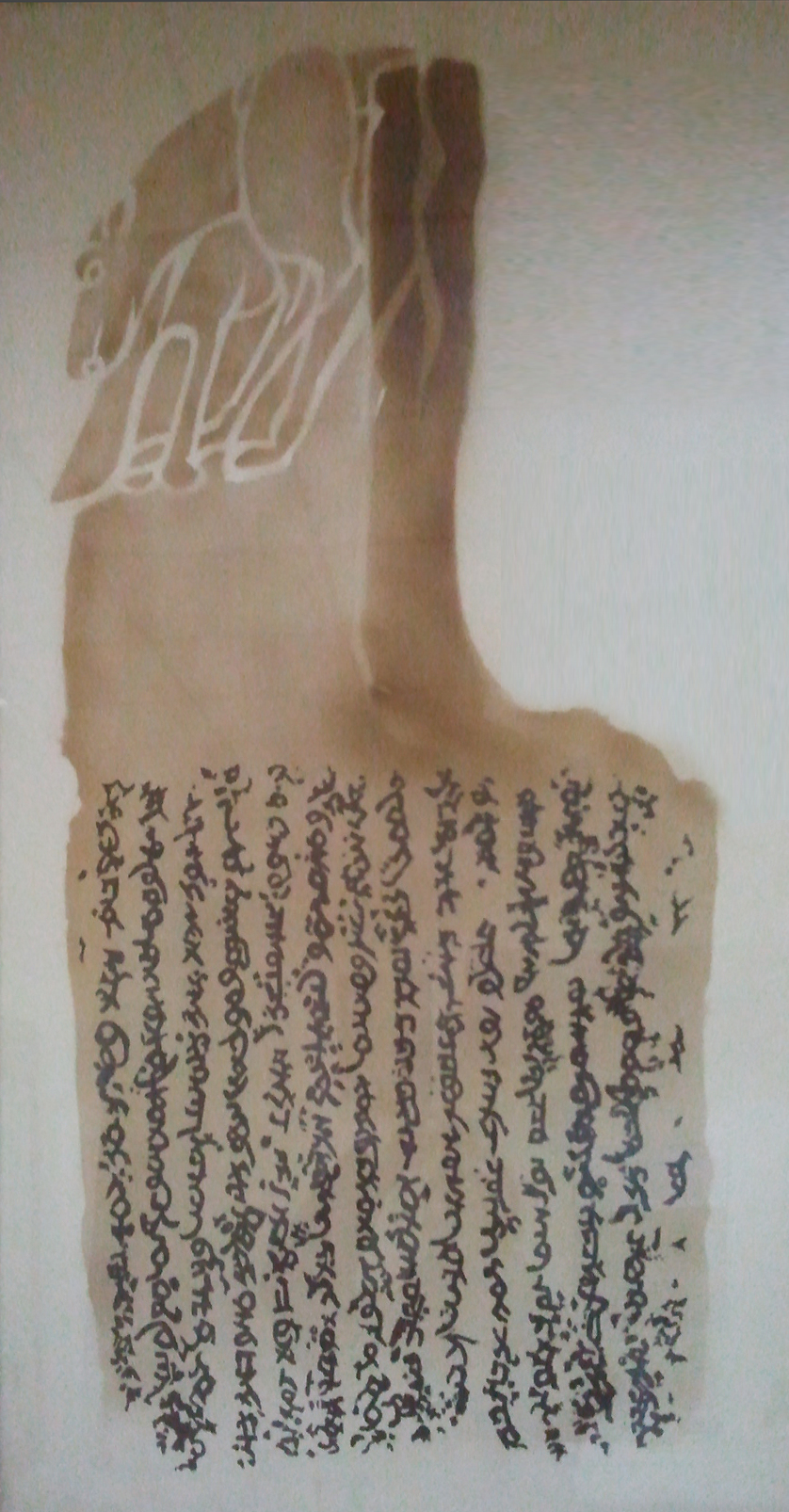
Sogdian script on the Bugut Inscription (585), central Mongolia. Sogdian is the distant ancestor of the Mongolian script.

The "Uyghur" cursive script eventually developed into the Old Uyghur alphabet, which was used to write the Old Uyghur language. This child script was, however, rotated 90 degrees anticlockwise, written in a vertical direction from top to bottom, but with the first vertical line starting from the left side, not from the right as in Chinese, most probably because the right-to-left direction was used in horizontal writing. The Traditional Mongolian alphabet, being an adaptation of the Old Uyghur alphabet, still uses this kind of vertical writing, as does its more remote descendant Manchu.

== Encoding ==
There are fonts encoding Sogdian alphabets in Unicode – Noto Sans Old Sogdian and Noto Sans Sogdian.

In Syriac script, three additional characters were used to represent sounds of Sogdian that were not present in the Syriac language. These were included in Unicode in 2002.

- 074D ݍ Syriac Letter Sogdian Zhain (compare 0719 ܙ Syriac Letter Zain)
- 074E ݎ Syriac Letter Sogdian Khaph (versus 071F ܟ Syriac Letter Kaph) – compare initial forms ݎ‍ and ܟ‍
- 074F ݏ Syriac Letter Sogdian Fe (compare 0726 ܦ Syriac Letter Pe)

Old Sogdian and Sogdian were added to the Unicode Standard in June, 2018 with the release of version 11.0.

=== Blocks ===
The Unicode block for Old Sogdian is U+10F00–U+10F2F and contains 40 characters:

Old Sogdian^{[1]}^{[2]} Official Unicode Consortium code chart (PDF)
	0	1	2	3	4	5	6	7	8	9	A	B	C	D	E	F
U+10F0x	𐼀	𐼁	𐼂	𐼃	𐼄	𐼅	𐼆	𐼇	𐼈	𐼉	𐼊	𐼋	𐼌	𐼍	𐼎	𐼏
U+10F1x	𐼐	𐼑	𐼒	𐼓	𐼔	𐼕	𐼖	𐼗	𐼘	𐼙	𐼚	𐼛	𐼜	𐼝	𐼞	𐼟
U+10F2x	𐼠	𐼡	𐼢	𐼣	𐼤	𐼥	𐼦	𐼧								
Notes 1.As of Unicode version 17.0 2.Grey areas indicate non-assigned code points

The Unicode block for Sogdian is U+10F30–U+10F6F and contains 42 characters:

Sogdian^{[1]}^{[2]} Official Unicode Consortium code chart (PDF)
	0	1	2	3	4	5	6	7	8	9	A	B	C	D	E	F
U+10F3x	𐼰	𐼱	𐼲	𐼳	𐼴	𐼵	𐼶	𐼷	𐼸	𐼹	𐼺	𐼻	𐼼	𐼽	𐼾	𐼿
U+10F4x	𐽀	𐽁	𐽂	𐽃	𐽄	𐽅	𐽆	𐽇	𐽈	𐽉	𐽊	𐽋	𐽌	𐽍	𐽎	𐽏
U+10F5x	𐽐	𐽑	𐽒	𐽓	𐽔	𐽕	𐽖	𐽗	𐽘	𐽙						
U+10F6x																
Notes 1.As of Unicode version 17.0 2.Grey areas indicate non-assigned code points

== See also ==
- Sogdian language
- Manichaean alphabet
- Syriac alphabet
