= Old Sogdian (Unicode block) =

- Range: U+10F00..U+10F2F (48 code points)
- Plane: SMP
- Scripts: Old Sogdian
- Assigned: 40 code points
- Unused: 8 reserved code points

Unicode version history
- 11.0 (2018): 40 (+40)

Unicode documentation
- Code chart ∣ Web page

Old Sogdian is a Unicode block containing characters for a group of related, non-cursive Sogdian writing systems used to write historic Sogdian in the 3rd to 5th centuries CE.

== Block ==
Old Sogdian^{[1]}^{[2]} Official Unicode Consortium code chart (PDF)
	0	1	2	3	4	5	6	7	8	9	A	B	C	D	E	F
U+10F0x	𐼀	𐼁	𐼂	𐼃	𐼄	𐼅	𐼆	𐼇	𐼈	𐼉	𐼊	𐼋	𐼌	𐼍	𐼎	𐼏
U+10F1x	𐼐	𐼑	𐼒	𐼓	𐼔	𐼕	𐼖	𐼗	𐼘	𐼙	𐼚	𐼛	𐼜	𐼝	𐼞	𐼟
U+10F2x	𐼠	𐼡	𐼢	𐼣	𐼤	𐼥	𐼦	𐼧								
Notes: 1. As of Unicode version 16.0; 2. Grey areas indicate non-assigned code points

== History ==
The following Unicode-related documents record the purpose and process of defining specific characters in the Old Sogdian block:

Version	Final code points (Note: Proposed code points and characters names may differ from final code points and names)	Count	L2 ID	WG2 ID	Document
11.0	U+10F00..10F27	40	L2/00-128		Bunz, Carl-Martin (2000-03-01), Scripts from the Past in Future Versions of Unicode
11.0	U+10F00..10F27	40	L2/01-007		Bunz, Carl-Martin (2000-12-21), "Inscriptional Alphabets (Middle Persian, Parthian) and Sogdian vs. Aramaic", Iranianist Meeting Report: Symposium on Encoding Iranian Scripts in Unicode
11.0	U+10F00..10F27	40	L2/02-009		Bunz, Carl-Martin (2001-11-23), "Sogdian script", 2nd Iranian Meeting Report
11.0	U+10F00..10F27	40	L2/15-149		Anderson, Deborah; Whistler, Ken; McGowan, Rick; Pournader, Roozbeh; Pandey, Anshuman; Glass, Andrew (2015-05-03), "8. Old Sogdian", Recommendations to UTC #143 May 2015 on Script Proposals
11.0	U+10F00..10F27	40	L2/15-089R		Pandey, Anshuman (2015-11-03), Preliminary Proposal to Encode the Old Sogdian Script
11.0	U+10F00..10F27	40	L2/16-037		Anderson, Deborah; Whistler, Ken; McGowan, Rick; Pournader, Roozbeh; Glass, Andrew; Iancu, Laurențiu (2016-01-22), "10. Old Sogdian", Recommendations to UTC #146 January 2016 on Script Proposals
11.0	U+10F00..10F27	40	L2/16-312R	N4814	Pandey, Anshuman (2016-12-01), Proposal to encode the Old Sogdian script
11.0	U+10F00..10F27	40	L2/17-037		Anderson, Deborah; Whistler, Ken; Pournader, Roozbeh; Glass, Andrew; Iancu, Laurențiu; Moore, Lisa; Liang, Hai; Ishida, Richard; Misra, Karan; McGowan, Rick (2017-01-21), "13. Old Sogdian", Recommendations to UTC #150 January 2017 on Script Proposals
11.0	U+10F00..10F27	40	L2/17-016		Moore, Lisa (2017-02-08), "D.11", UTC #150 Minutes
11.0	U+10F00..10F27	40	L2/17-362		Moore, Lisa (2018-02-02), "Consensus 153-C41", UTC #153 Minutes

== Font ==
There is a Unicode font encoding Old Sogdian - Noto Sans Old Sogdian.
