= Sogdian (Unicode block) =

- Range: U+10F30..U+10F6F (64 code points)
- Plane: SMP
- Scripts: Sogdian
- Assigned: 42 code points
- Unused: 22 reserved code points

Unicode version history
- 11.0 (2018): 42 (+42)

Unicode documentation
- Code chart ∣ Web page

Sogdian is a Unicode block containing characters used to write the Sogdian language from the 7th to 14th centuries CE.

== Block ==
Sogdian^{[1]}^{[2]} Official Unicode Consortium code chart (PDF)
	0	1	2	3	4	5	6	7	8	9	A	B	C	D	E	F
U+10F3x	𐼰	𐼱	𐼲	𐼳	𐼴	𐼵	𐼶	𐼷	𐼸	𐼹	𐼺	𐼻	𐼼	𐼽	𐼾	𐼿
U+10F4x	𐽀	𐽁	𐽂	𐽃	𐽄	𐽅	𐽆	𐽇	𐽈	𐽉	𐽊	𐽋	𐽌	𐽍	𐽎	𐽏
U+10F5x	𐽐	𐽑	𐽒	𐽓	𐽔	𐽕	𐽖	𐽗	𐽘	𐽙						
U+10F6x																
Notes: 1. As of Unicode version 16.0; 2. Grey areas indicate non-assigned code points

== History ==
The following Unicode-related documents record the purpose and process of defining specific characters in the Sogdian block:

Version	Final code points (Note: Proposed code points and characters names may differ from final code points and names)	Count	L2 ID	WG2 ID	Document
11.0	U+10F30..10F59	42	L2/00-128		Bunz, Carl-Martin (2000-03-01), Scripts from the Past in Future Versions of Unicode
11.0	U+10F30..10F59	42	L2/01-007		Bunz, Carl-Martin (2000-12-21), "Inscriptional Alphabets (Middle Persian, Parthian) and Sogdian vs. Aramaic", Iranianist Meeting Report: Symposium on Encoding Iranian Scripts in Unicode
11.0	U+10F30..10F59	42	L2/02-009		Bunz, Carl-Martin (2001-11-23), "Sogdian script", 2nd Iranian Meeting Report
11.0	U+10F30..10F59	42	L2/16-158		Pandey, Anshuman (2016-05-09), Preliminary proposal to encode Sogdian in Unicode
11.0	U+10F30..10F59	42	L2/16-216		Anderson, Deborah; Whistler, Ken; McGowan, Rick; Pournader, Roozbeh; Glass, Andrew; Iancu, Laurențiu; Moore, Lisa (2016-07-30), "7. Sogdian", Recommendations to UTC #148 August 2016 on Script Proposals
11.0	U+10F30..10F59	42	L2/17-037		Anderson, Deborah; Whistler, Ken; Pournader, Roozbeh; Glass, Andrew; Iancu, Laurențiu; Moore, Lisa; Liang, Hai; Ishida, Richard; Misra, Karan; McGowan, Rick (2017-01-21), "14. Sogdian", Recommendations to UTC #150 January 2017 on Script Proposals
11.0	U+10F30..10F59	42	L2/17-016		Moore, Lisa (2017-02-08), "D.12", UTC #150 Minutes
11.0	U+10F30..10F59	42	L2/16-371R2	N4815	Pandey, Anshuman (2017-01-25), Revised proposal to encode the Sogdian script
11.0	U+10F30..10F59	42	L2/18-115		Moore, Lisa (2018-05-09), "B.11.12", UTC #155 Minutes
11.0	U+10F30..10F59	42		N5020 (pdf, doc)	Umamaheswaran, V. S. (2019-01-11), "6.2.2 and 6.2.3", Unconfirmed minutes of WG 2 meeting 67

== Font ==
There is a Unicode font encoding Sogdian - Noto Sans Sogdian.
