= Horizontal and vertical writing in East Asian scripts =

Writing conventions of eastern Asian countries

Horizontal writing

Chinese name
- Traditional Chinese: 橫排
- Simplified Chinese: 横排
Transcriptions
Standard Mandarin
- Hanyu Pinyin: héngpái
- Wade–Giles: hêng2 pʻai2
Hakka
- Pha̍k-fa-sṳ: vàng-phài
Yue: Cantonese
- Jyutping: waang4 paai4
Southern Min
- Hokkien POJ: hêng-pâi

Vietnamese name
- Vietnamese alphabet: viết ngang
- Hán-Nôm: 曰昂

Korean name
- Hangul: 횡서, 가로쓰기
- Hanja: 橫書
Transcriptions
- Revised Romanization: hoengseo, garosseugi

Mongolian name
- Mongolian Cyrillic: босоо бичиг
- Mongolian script: ᠪᠣᠰᠤᠭ᠎ᠠ ᠪᠢᠴᠢᠭ
Transcriptions
- SASM/GNC: bosug-a bicig

Japanese name
- Kanji: 横書き; 横組み
- Hiragana: よこがき; よこぐみ
Transcriptions
- Romanization: yokogaki; yokogumi

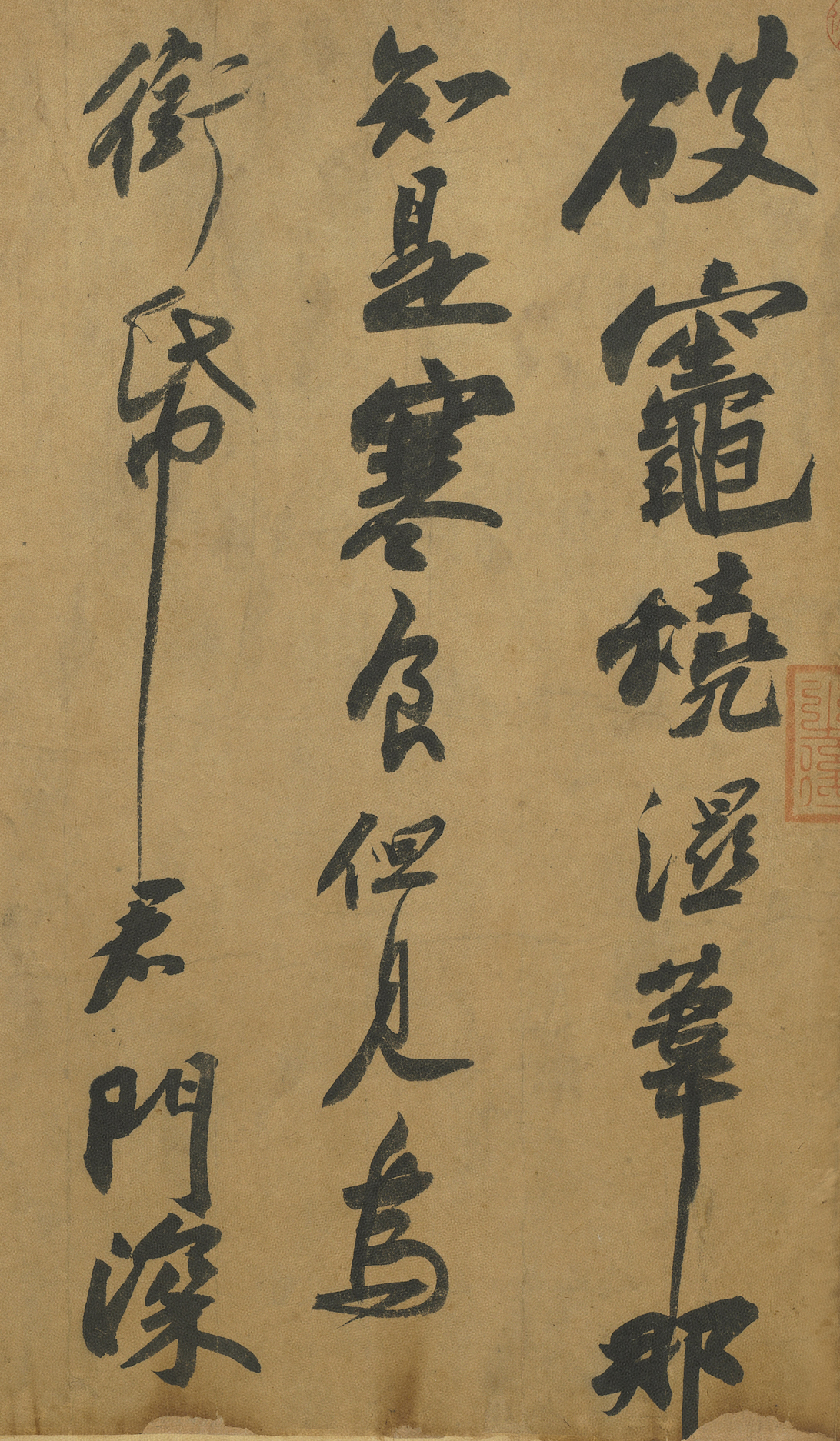
An excerpt from The Cold Food Observance (寒食帖) by Song dynasty scholar Su Shi (1037–1101). The calligraphy is read in columns from top to bottom, from right to left.

Vertical writing

Chinese name
- Traditional Chinese: 縱排
- Simplified Chinese: 纵排
Transcriptions
Standard Mandarin
- Hanyu Pinyin: zòngpái
- Wade–Giles: tsung4 pʻai2
Hakka
- Pha̍k-fa-sṳ: chiûng-phài; chiúng-phài
Yue: Cantonese
- Jyutping: zung1 paai4
Southern Min
- Hokkien POJ: chhiòng-pâi

Vietnamese name
- Vietnamese alphabet: viết dọc
- Hán-Nôm: 曰𫆡

Korean name
- Hangul: 종서; 세로쓰기
- Hanja: 縱書
Transcriptions
- Revised Romanization: serosseugi; serossŭki

Japanese name
- Hiragana: たてがき; たてぐみ
- Kyūjitai: 縱書き; 縱組み
- Shinjitai: 縦書き; 縦組み
Transcriptions
- Revised Hepburn: tategaki; tategumi

Many East Asian scripts can be written horizontally or vertically. Chinese characters, Korean hangul, and Japanese kana may be oriented along either axis, as they consist mainly of disconnected logographic or syllabic units, each occupying a square block of space, thus allowing for flexibility for which direction texts can be written, be it horizontally from left to right, horizontally from right to left, vertically from top to bottom, or even vertically from bottom to top.

Traditionally, written Chinese, Vietnamese, Korean, and Japanese are written vertically in columns going from top to bottom and ordered from right to left, with each new column starting to the left of the preceding one. The stroke order and stroke direction of Chinese characters, Vietnamese chữ Nôm, Korean hangul, and kana all facilitate writing in this manner. In addition, writing in vertical columns from right to left facilitated writing with a brush in the right hand while continually unrolling the sheet of paper or scroll with the left. Since the nineteenth century, it has become increasingly common for these languages to be written horizontally, from left to right, with successive rows going from top to bottom, under the influence of European languages such as English, although vertical writing is still frequently used in Hong Kong, Japan, Macau, and Taiwan.

== Differences between horizontal and vertical writing ==
Chinese characters, Japanese kana, Vietnamese chữ Nôm and Korean hangul can be written horizontally or vertically. There are some small differences in orthography. In horizontal writing it is more common to use Arabic numerals, whereas Chinese numerals are more common in vertical text.

In these scripts, the positions of punctuation marks, for example the relative position of commas and full stops (periods), differ between horizontal and vertical writing. Punctuation such as the parentheses, quotation marks, book title marks (Chinese), ellipsis mark, dash, wavy dash (Japanese), proper noun mark (Chinese), wavy book title mark (Chinese), emphasis mark, and chōon mark (Japanese) are all rotated 90 degrees when switching between horizontal and vertical text.

Where a text is written in horizontal format, pages are read in the same order as English books, with the binding at the left and pages progressing to the right. Vertical books are printed the other way round, with the binding at the right, and pages progressing to the left.

Ruby characters like furigana in Japanese which provides a phonetic guide for unusual or difficult-to-read characters, follow the direction of the main text. Example in Japanese, with furigana in green:

漢 / か ん; 字 / じ	or	かん / じ; 漢 / 字

Bopomofo in Taiwan is usually written vertically regardless of the direction of the main text. Text in the Latin alphabet is usually written horizontally when it appears in vertical text, or else it is turned sideways with the base of the characters on the left.

=== Right-to-left horizontal writing ===
Historically, vertical writing was the standard system, and horizontal writing was only used where a sign had to fit in a constrained space, such as over the gate of a temple or the signboard of a shop. Before the end of World War II in Japan, those signs were read right to left.

Today, the left-to-right direction is dominant in all three languages for horizontal writing: this is due partly to the influence of English and other Western languages to make it easier to read when the two languages are found together—for example, on airport signs at a train station—and partly to the increased use of computerized typesetting and word processing software, most of which does not directly support right-to-left layout of East Asian languages. However, right-to-left horizontal writing is still seen in these scripts, in such places as signs, on the right-hand side of vehicles, and on the right-hand side of stands selling food at festivals. It is also used to simulate archaic writing, for example in reconstructions of old Japan for tourists, and it is still found in the captions and titles of some newspapers.

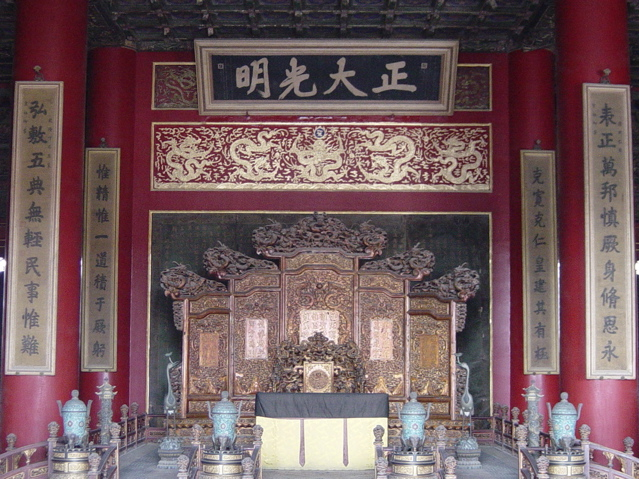
Imperial throne inside the Forbidden City in Beijing. The plaque at the top 正大光明 is written from right to left, while the plaques on the sides use vertical writing.

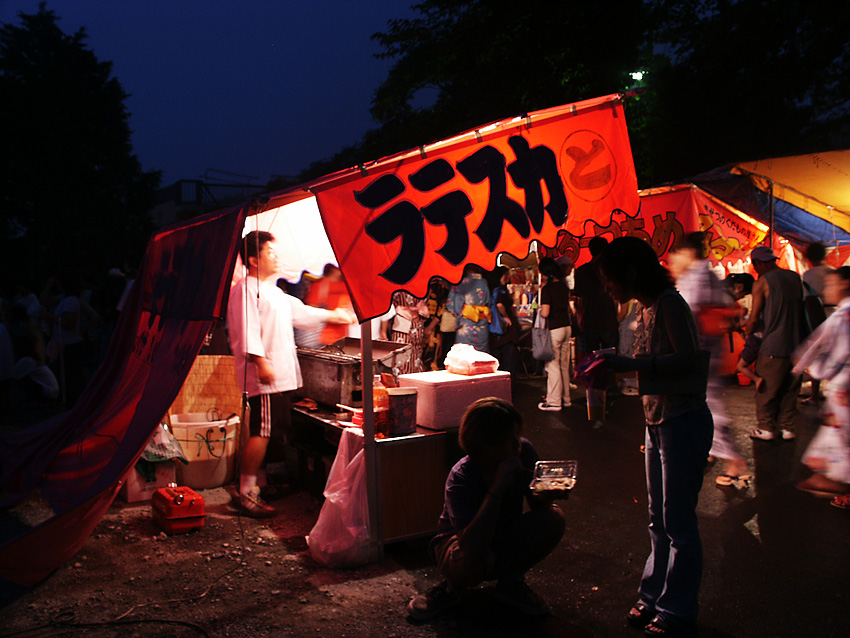
The word kasutera (カステラ) written from right to left on the right-hand side of a festival stall in Hakone, Japan.

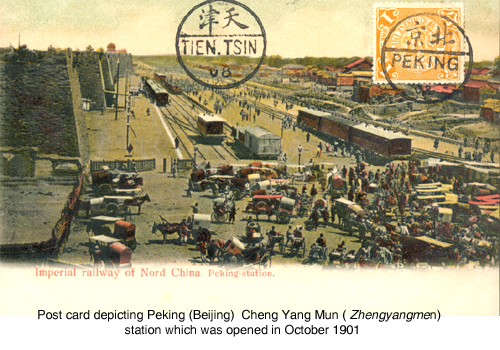
Two examples of right-to-left characters on a Chinese postcard from 1901, 津天 and 京北

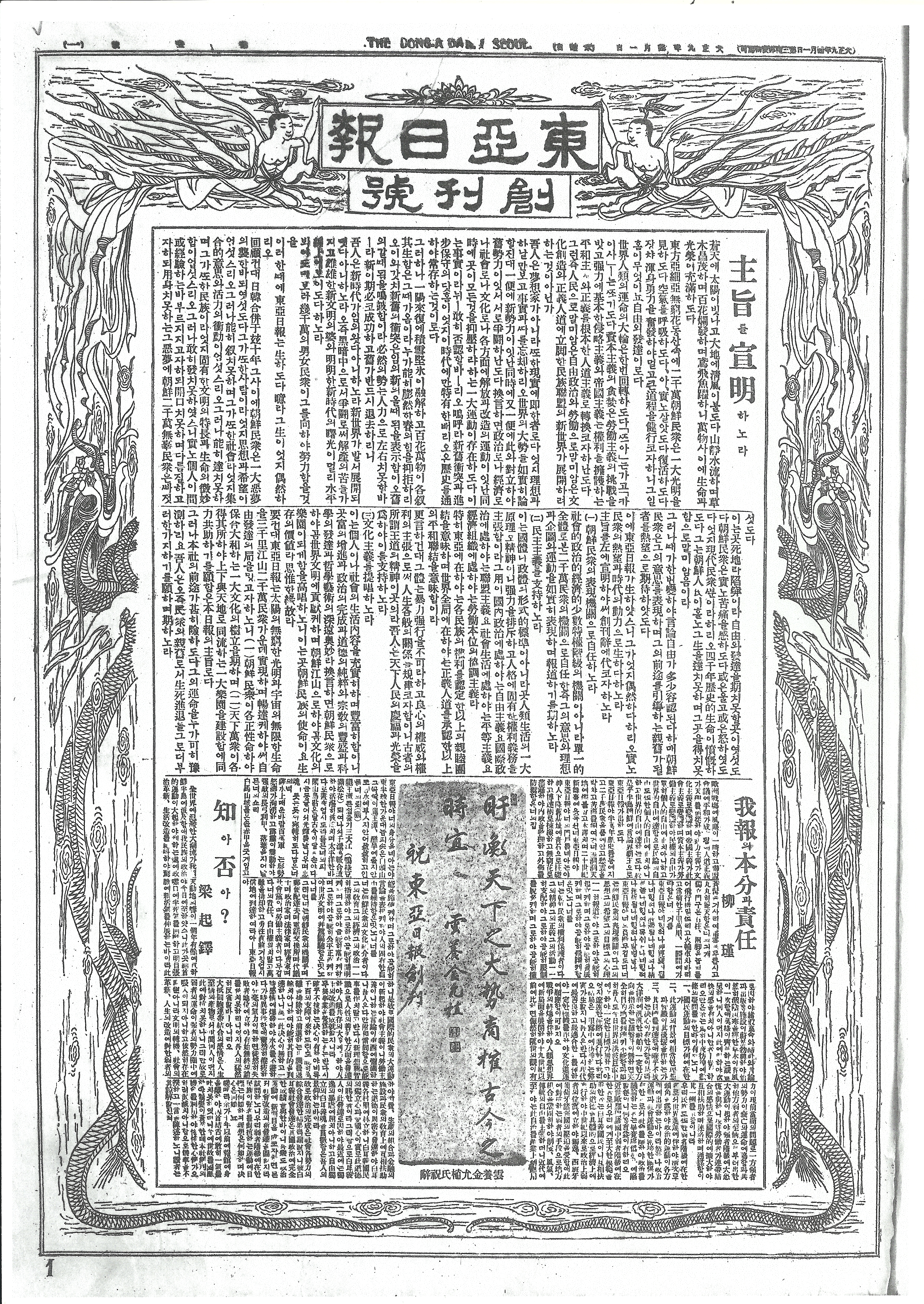
First issue of The Dong-a Ilbo on 1 April 1920. The title 報日亞東 and 號刊創 were written from right to left.

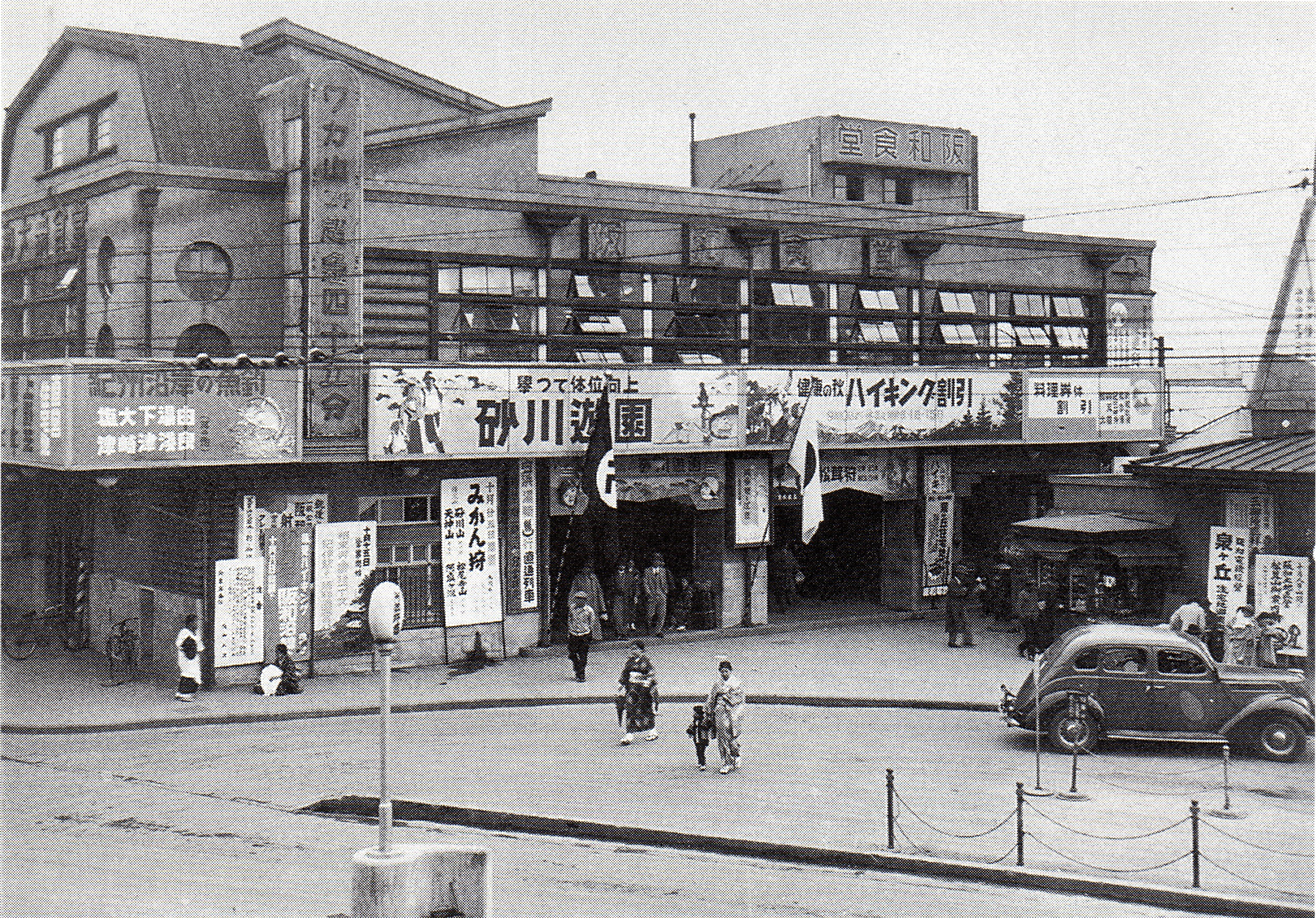
Tennōji Station in 1938. Horizontal writing from left to right is becoming popular. Signs for “砂川遊園” and “ハイキング割引” are written horizontally from left to right. However, the sign for “阪和食堂” is written horizontally in the traditional right-to-left style. Other vertically written signs also stand out.

=== Left-to-right vertical writing ===
There are only two types of vertical scripts known to have been written from left to right: the Old Uyghur script and its descendants — Traditional Mongolian, Oirat Clear, Manchu, and Buryat — and the 'Phags-pa script. The former developed because the Uyghurs rotated their Sogdian-derived script, originally written right to left, 90 degrees counter-clockwise to emulate Chinese writing, but without changing the relative orientation of the letters. 'Phags-pa in turn was an adaptation of Tibetan script written vertically on the model of Mongolian to supplant those writing systems current in the Mongol Empire. Of these, only traditional Mongolian still remains in use today in Inner Mongolia.

== History ==
=== Chinese ===
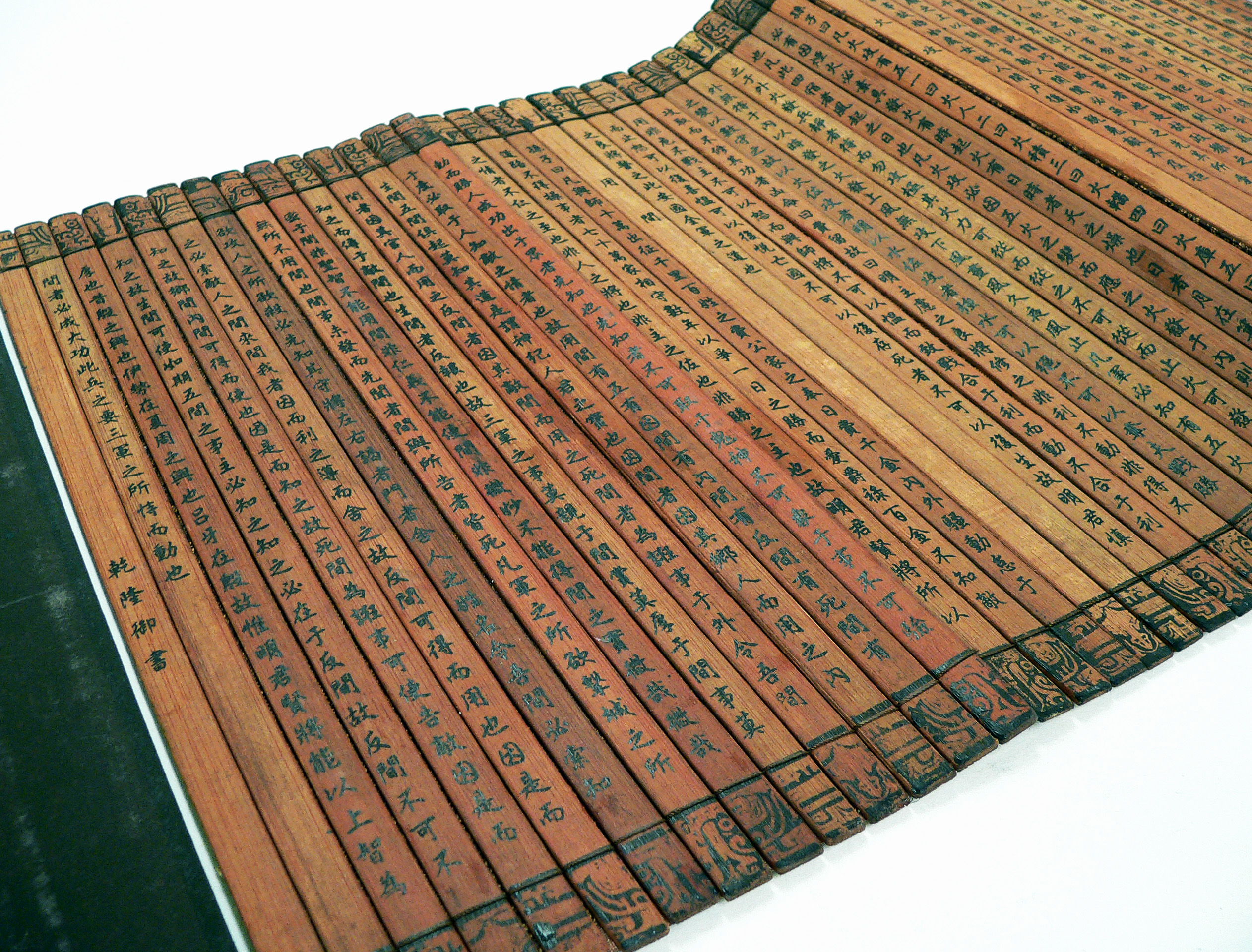
An unfolded bamboo book featuring Chinese text written vertically along the strips of bamboo.

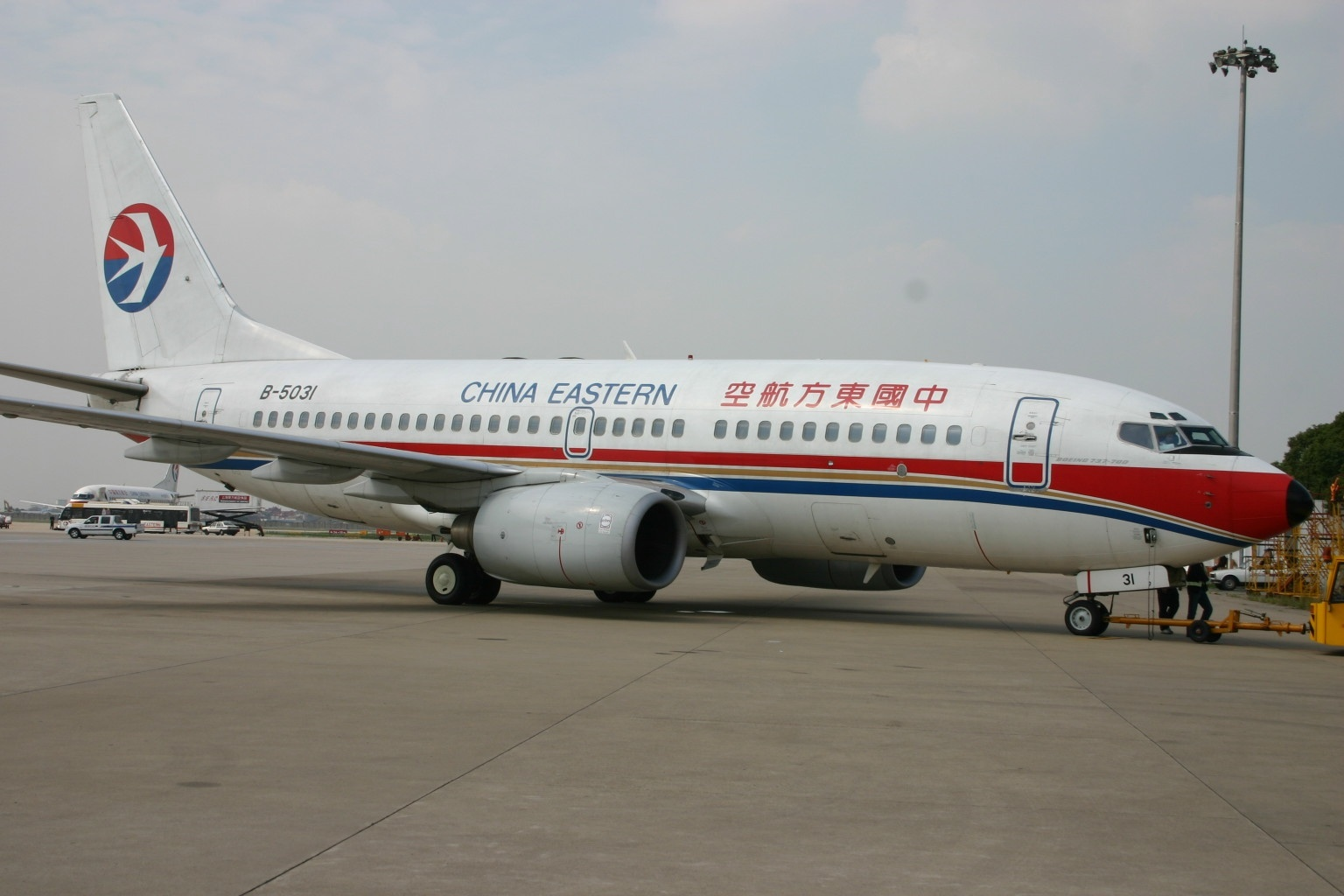
Text on the sides of vehicles runs from the front of the vehicle to the rear, i.e. from left to right on the vehicle's left side, and from right to left on its right side.

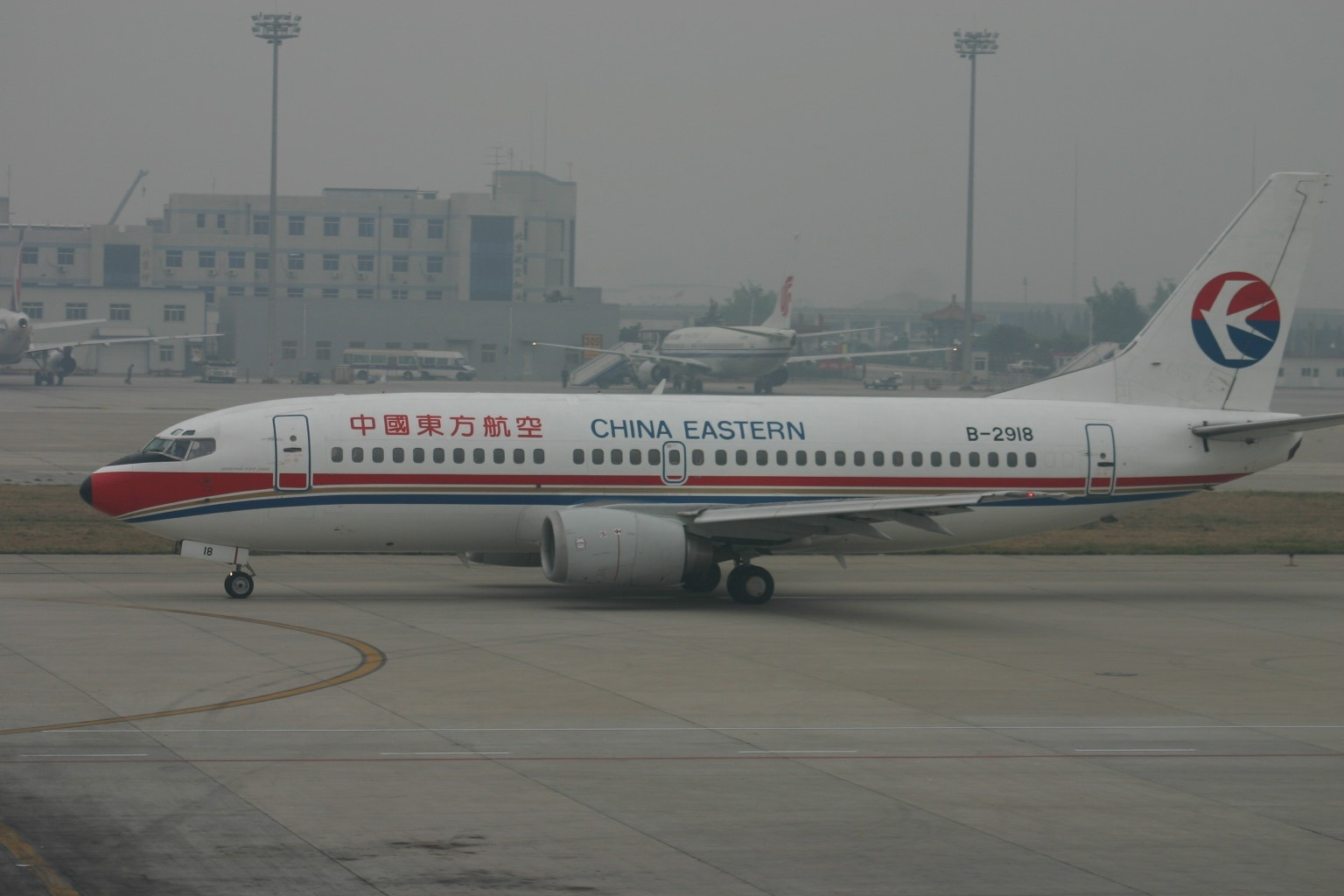
Notice the writing on the portside being from left-to-right

An early printed Chinese text in horizontal alignment was Robert Morrison's A Dictionary of the Chinese Language, published in 1815–1823 in Macau.

The earliest widely known Chinese publication using horizontal alignment was the magazine Science (科學). Its first issue in January 1915 explained the (then) unusual format:

本雜誌印法，旁行上左，並用西文句讀點之，以便插寫算術及物理化學諸程式，非故好新奇，讀者諒之。
This magazine is printed sideways from the top left, and marked with Western punctuation. This is to make more convenient the insertion of mathematical, physical and chemical formulae, and not for novelty's sake. We ask for our readers' understanding.

In the subsequent decades, the occurrence of words in a Western script became more frequent, and readers began to appreciate the unwieldiness of rotating the paper at each occurrence for vertically set texts. This accelerated acceptance of horizontal writing.

With the proliferation of horizontal text, both horizontal and vertical came to be used concurrently. Proponents of horizontal text argued that vertical text in right-to-left columns was smudged easily when written, and moreover demanded greater movement from the eyes when read. Vertical text proponents considered horizontal text to be a break from established tradition.

After their victory in the Chinese Civil War, the People's Republic of China decided to use horizontal writing. All newspapers in China changed from vertical to horizontal alignment on 1 January 1956. In publications, text is run horizontally although book titles on spines and some newspaper headlines remain vertical for convenience. Inscriptions of signs on most state organs are still vertical.

In Singapore, vertical writing has also become rare. In Taiwan, Hong Kong, Macau, and among older overseas Chinese communities, horizontal writing has been gradually adopted since the 1990s. By the early 2000s, most newspapers in these areas had switched to left-to-right horizontal writing, either entirely or in a combination of vertical text with horizontal left-to-right headings.

=== Japanese ===
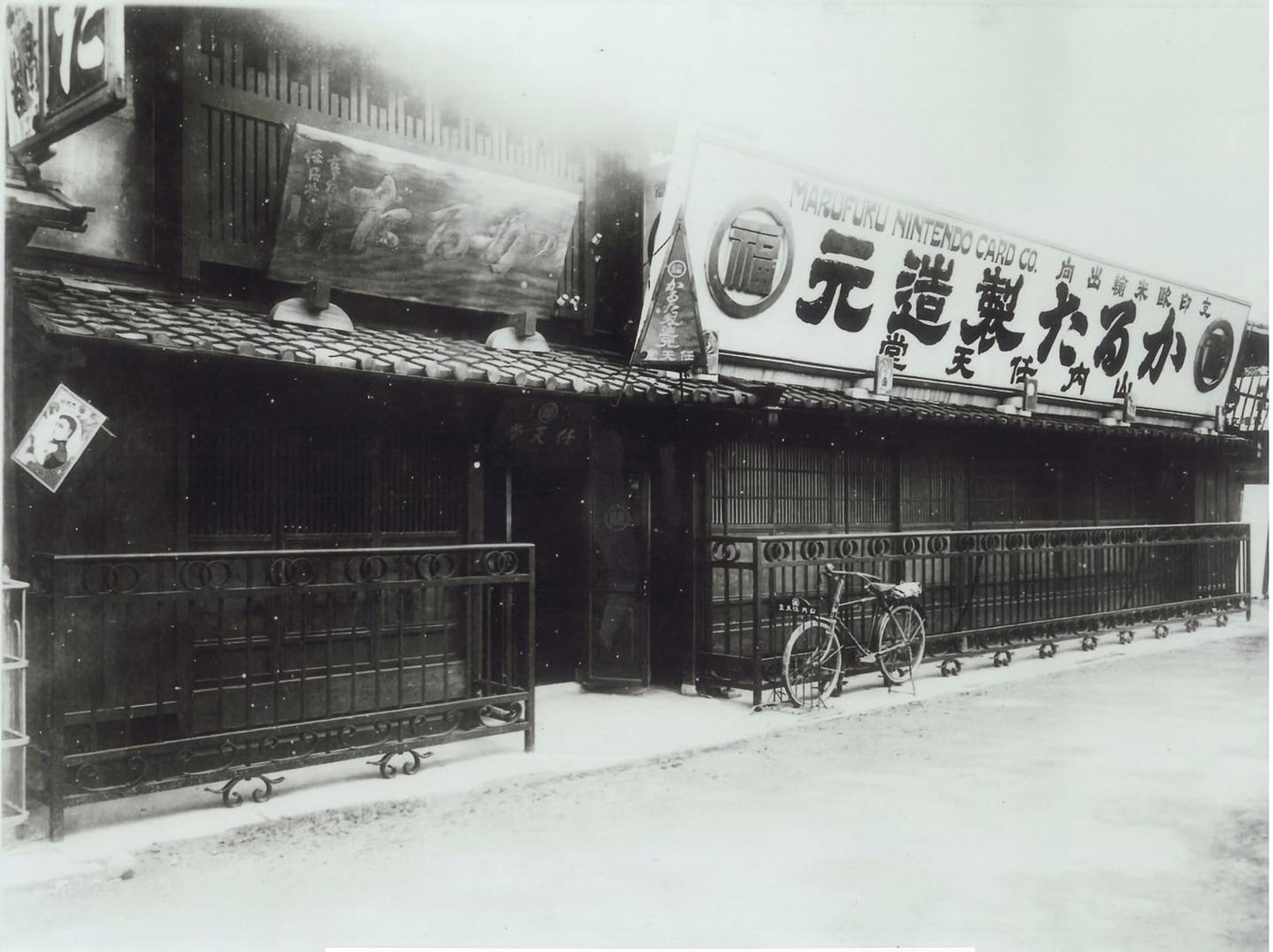
Meiji-era playing card manufactury of Nintendo, with its sign written right-to-left

Horizontal text came into Japanese in the Meiji era, when the Japanese began to print Western language dictionaries. Initially they printed the dictionaries in a mixture of horizontal Western and vertical Japanese text, which meant readers had to rotate the book ninety degrees to read the Western text. Because this was unwieldy, the idea of yokogaki came to be accepted. One of the first publications to partially use yokogaki was a German to Japanese dictionary (袖珍挿図独和辞書 Shūchinsōzu Dokuwa Jisho 'pocket illustrated German to Japanese dictionary') published in 1885 (Meiji 18).

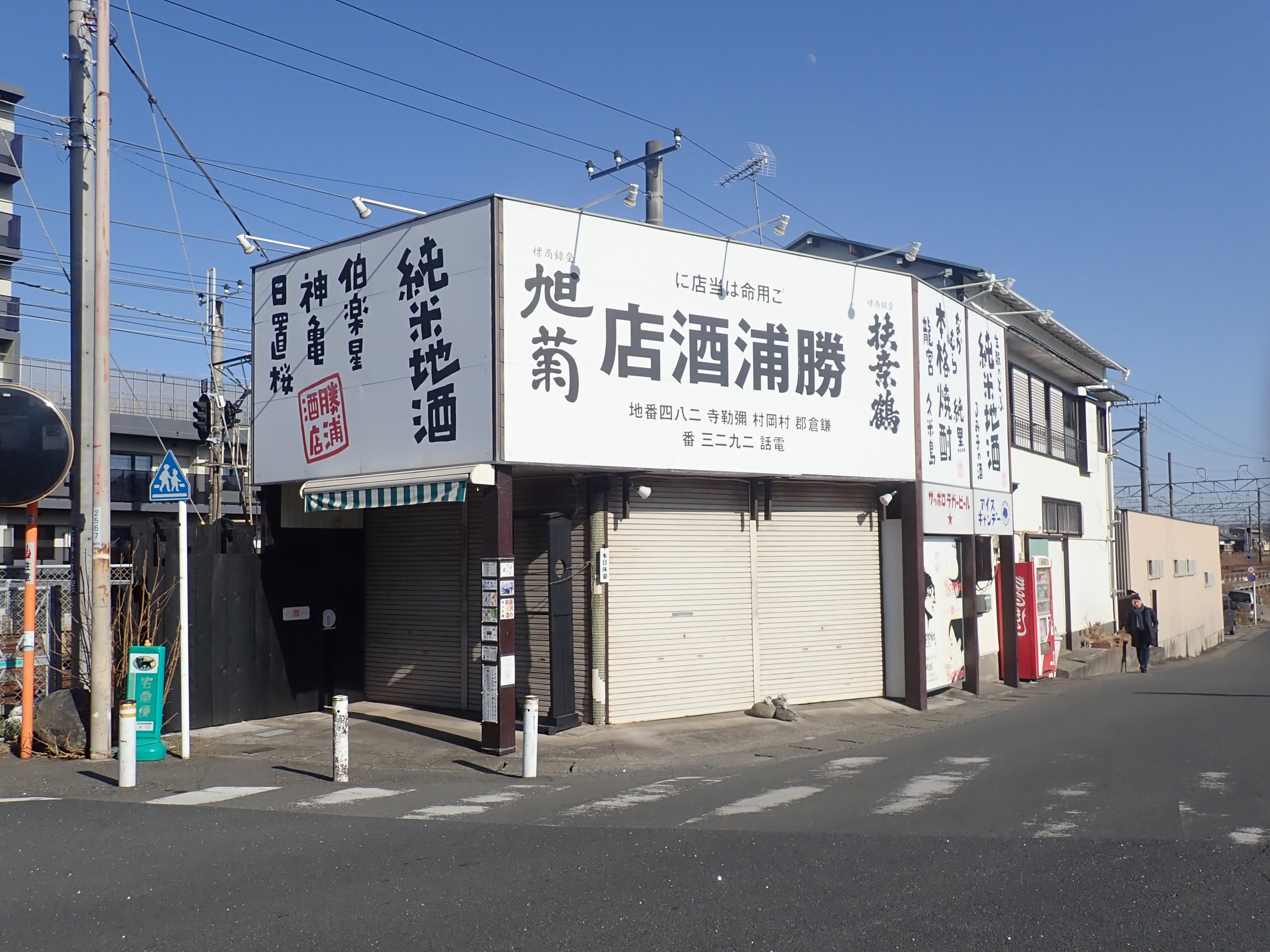
Right-to-left on Katsuura Saketen (勝浦酒店, a liquor store), in Fujisawa, photographed in 2026 (Note: This is not the result of unbroken tradition. A undated but obviously older photograph of an earlier building of Katsuura's shows it with a signboard written left to right. "Junmai sutairu" 純米スタイル [Junmai style].)

At the beginning of the change to horizontal alignment in Meiji era Japan, there was a short-lived form called migi yokogaki (右横書き, literally "right horizontal writing"), in contrast to hidari yokogaki, (左横書き 'left horizontal writing'), the current standard. This resembled the right-to-left horizontal writing style of languages such as Arabic with line breaks on the left. It was probably based on the traditional single-row right-to-left writing. This form was widely used for pre-WWII advertisements and official documents (like banknotes of the Japanese yen), but has not survived outside of old-fashioned signboards.

Vertical writing (tategaki 縦書き) is still commonly used in Japan in novels, newspapers and magazines, including most Japanese comics and graphic novels (also known as manga), while horizontal writing is used more often in other media, especially those containing English language references. In general, dialogue in manga is written vertically. However, in scenes where a character speaks a foreign language, the dialogue may be written horizontally. In this case, there is a mixture of vertical and horizontal writing on a single page.

=== Korean ===
Hunmin Jeongeum Eonhae uses right-to-left vertical writing. It uses hanja and small hangul for ruby lettering placed to the bottom-right.

Traditionally, Korean writing has been vertical, with columns running right to left.

In 1988, The Hankyoreh became the first Korean newspaper to use horizontal writing. The Chosun Ilbo was the last major newspaper to publish in vertical right-to-left writing; it published its last issue in vertical right-to-left writing on 1 March 1999, four days before its 79th anniversary. Other major newspapers had already switched to horizontal writing by 1 January 1998; Dong-A Ilbo published its last vertical issue on 31 December 1997, Kyunghyang Shinmun on 6 April 1997 (the day before its 50th anniversary), and Maeil Kyungje on 14 September 1996. Announcements about the impending change in these newspapers in the days preceding often shared a common theme of "appealing to younger audiences". Today, major Korean newspapers hardly ever run text vertically.

=== Vietnamese ===
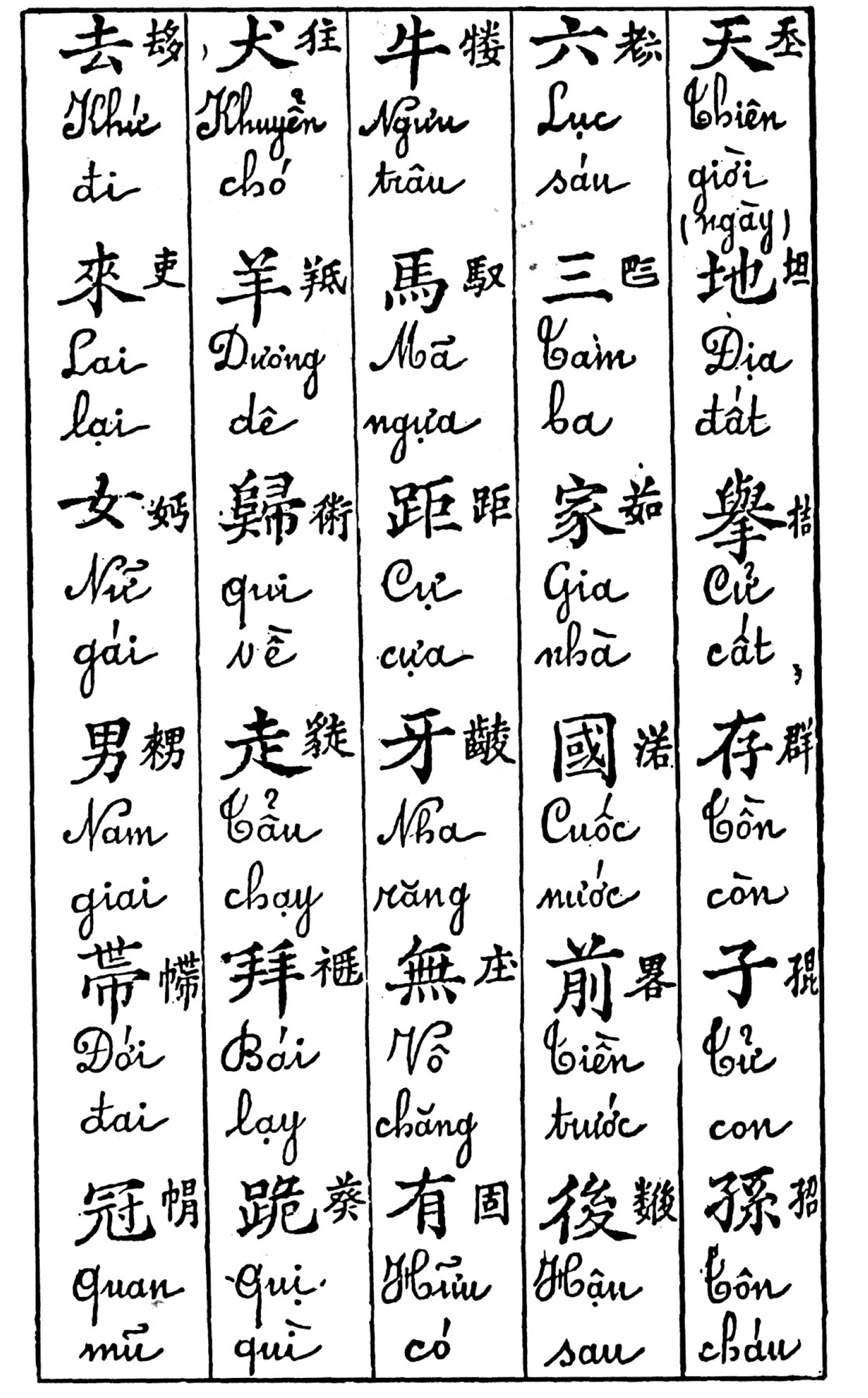
Vietnamese is shown here written right to left, top to bottom. Characters shown in Tam thiên tự are Chinese characters glossed with their equivalent chữ Nôm characters alongside the Vietnamese alphabet.

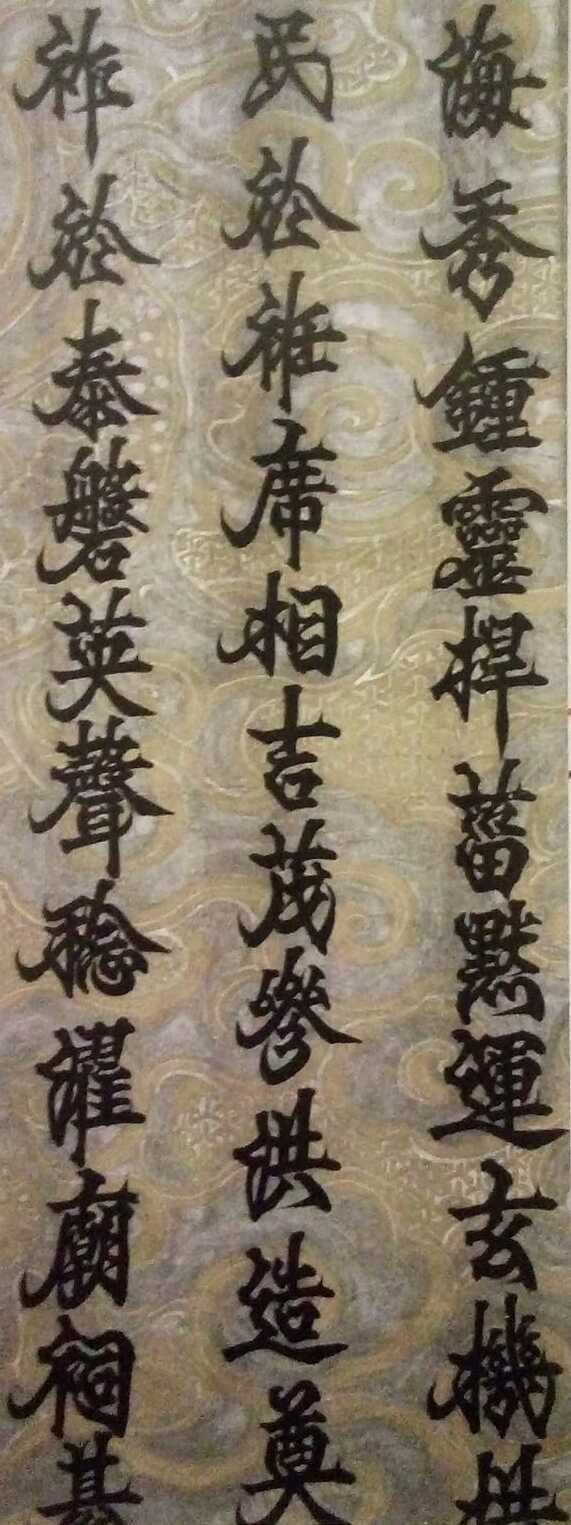
Characters on a Vietnamese edict written vertically.

Traditionally, Vietnamese writing was vertical, with columns running right to left as the language used a mixture of Chinese characters and independently developed characters derived from Chinese ones to write the native language in a script called chữ Nôm.

After the 1920s, when the Vietnamese alphabet, influenced by the Portuguese alphabet, started to be used nationwide to replace chữ Nôm, vertical writing style fell into disuse.

== In art ==
=== Calligraphy ===
In East Asian calligraphy, vertical writing remains the dominant direction.

=== Graphic novels and comics ===
Japanese manga tend to use vertical direction for text. Manga frames tend to flow in right-to-left horizontal direction. Frames in yonkoma manga tend to flow in a vertical direction. Page ordering is the same as books that use vertical direction: from right to left. Frames that are chronologically before or after each other use less spacing in between as a visual cue.

Most text in manga is written vertically, which dictates the vertical shapes of the speech bubbles. Some, however, such as Levius, are aimed at the international market and strive to optimize for translation and localization, therefore make use of horizontal text and speech bubbles.

In some cases, horizontal writing in text bubbles may be used to indicate that a translation convention is in use – for example, Kenshi Hirokane uses Japanese text arranged horizontally to imply that a character is actually speaking in a foreign language, like English.

Some publishers that translate manga into European languages may choose to keep the original page order (a notable example is Shonen Jump magazine), while other publishers may reverse the page flow with use of mirrored pages. When manga was first released in Anglophone countries, it was usually in the reversed format (also known as "flipped" or "flopped"), but the non-reversed format eventually came to predominate.

== Modern usage ==
=== Japanese and Traditional Chinese ===
Both horizontal and vertical writing are used in Japan, Hong Kong, Macau and Taiwan. Traditional characters are also used in mainland China in a few limited contexts, such as some books on ancient literature, or as an aesthetic choice for some signs on shops, temples, etc. In those contexts, both horizontal and vertical writing are used as well.

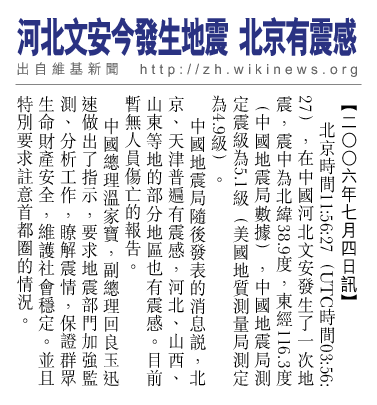
Example of a newspaper article written vertically in Traditional Chinese with a horizontal headline from left to right. The Latin letters and Arabic numerals are rotated when written with the vertical text.

Vertical writing is commonly used for novels, newspapers, manga, and many other forms of writing. Because it goes downward, vertical writing is invariably used on the spines of books. Some newspapers combine the two forms, using the vertical format for most articles but including some written horizontally, especially for headlines. Musical notation for some Japanese instruments such as the shakuhachi is written vertically.

Horizontal writing is easier for some purposes; academic texts are sometimes written this way since they often include words and phrases in other languages, which are more easily incorporated horizontally. Scientific and mathematical texts are nearly always written horizontally, since in vertical writing equations must be turned sideways, making them more difficult to read.

Similarly, English language textbooks, which contain many English words, are usually printed in horizontal writing. This is not a fixed rule, however, and it is also common to see English words printed sideways in vertical writing texts.

Japanese business cards (meishi) are often printed vertically in Japanese on one side, and horizontally in English on the other. Postcards and handwritten letters may be arranged horizontally or vertically, but the more formal the letter the more likely it is to be written vertically. Envelope addresses are usually vertical, with the recipient's address on the right and the recipient's name in the exact centre of the envelope. See also Japanese etiquette.

=== Simplified Chinese ===
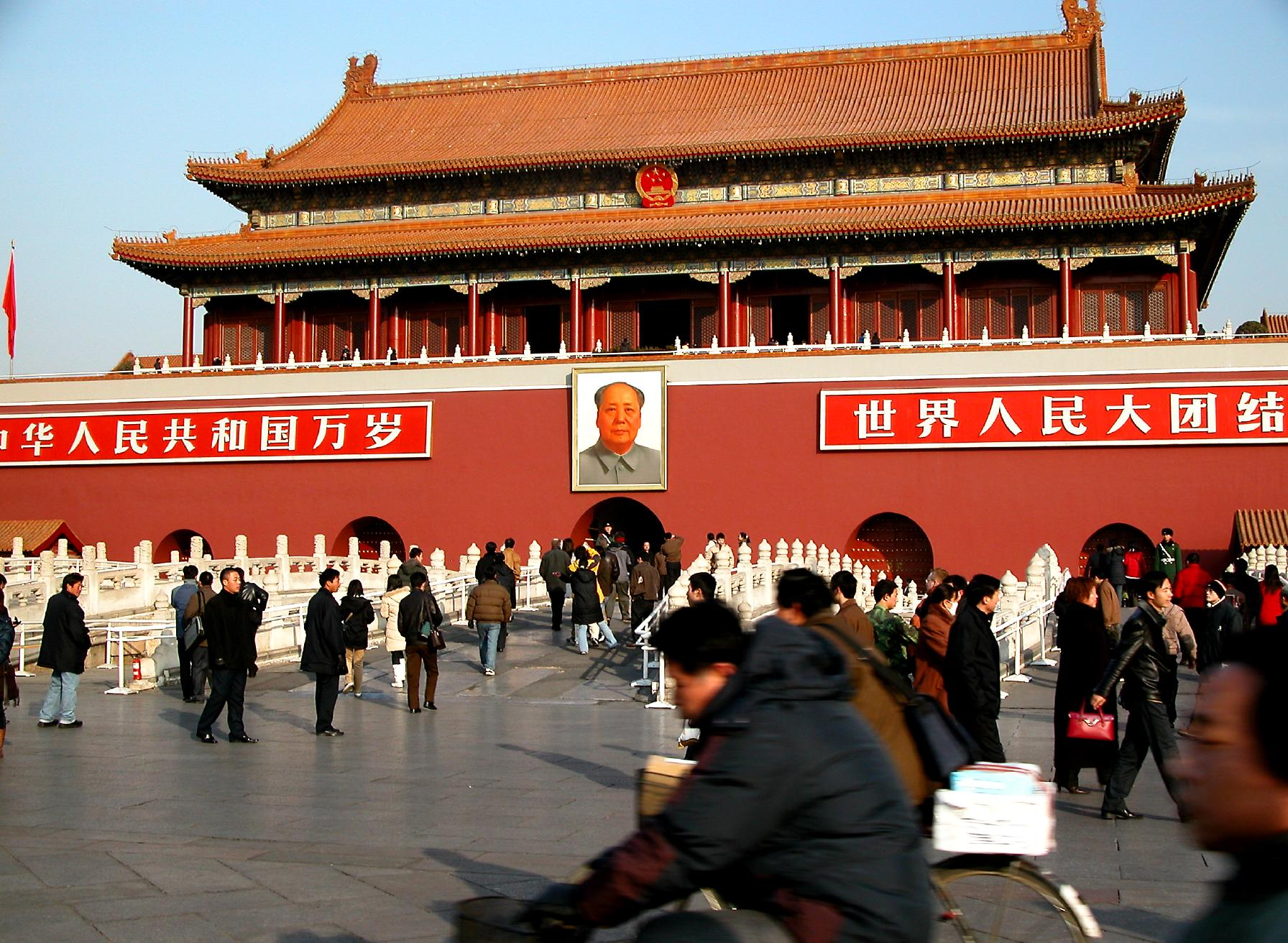
The slogans on Tiananmen ("Long live the People's Republic of China" and "Long live the unity of the people of the world") are written in simplified characters from left to right.

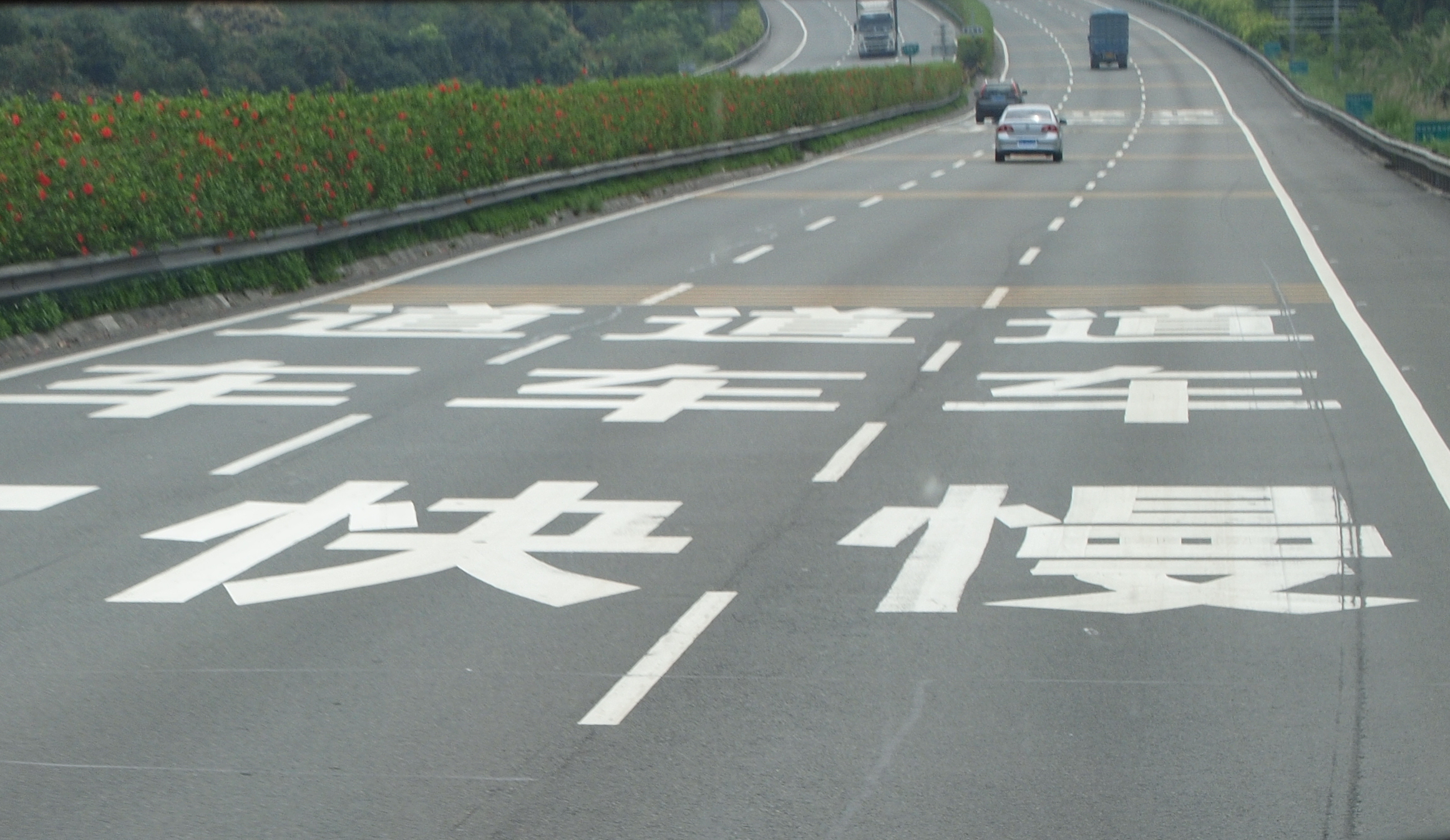
Highway markings are read from bottom to top. The right lane reads 慢车道 'slow lane' while the middle lane reads 快车道 'fast lane'

In mainland China, vertical writing using simplified characters is now comparatively rare, more so in print than in writing and signage. Most publications are now printed in horizontal alignment, like English. Horizontal writing is written left to right in the vast majority of cases, with a few exceptions such as bilingual dictionaries of Chinese and right-to-left scripts like Arabic, in which case Chinese may follow the right-to-left alignment. Right-to-left writing direction can also often be seen on the right side of tourist buses, as it is customary to have the text run (on both sides of the vehicle) from the front of the bus to its rear.

Vertical alignment is generally used for artistic or aesthetic purposes like in logos and on book covers, in scholarly works on Literary Chinese works, or when space constraints demand it, like on the spines of books and when labelling diagrams. Naturally, vertical text is also used on signs that are longer than they are wide; such signs are the norm at the entrances of schools, government offices and police stations. Calligraphy – in simplified or traditional characters – is invariably written vertically. Additionally, vertical text may still be encountered on some business cards and personal letters in China.

Since 2012, street markings are written vertically, but unusually from bottom to top. This is so that the characters are read from nearest to furthest from the drivers' perspective.

=== Korean ===
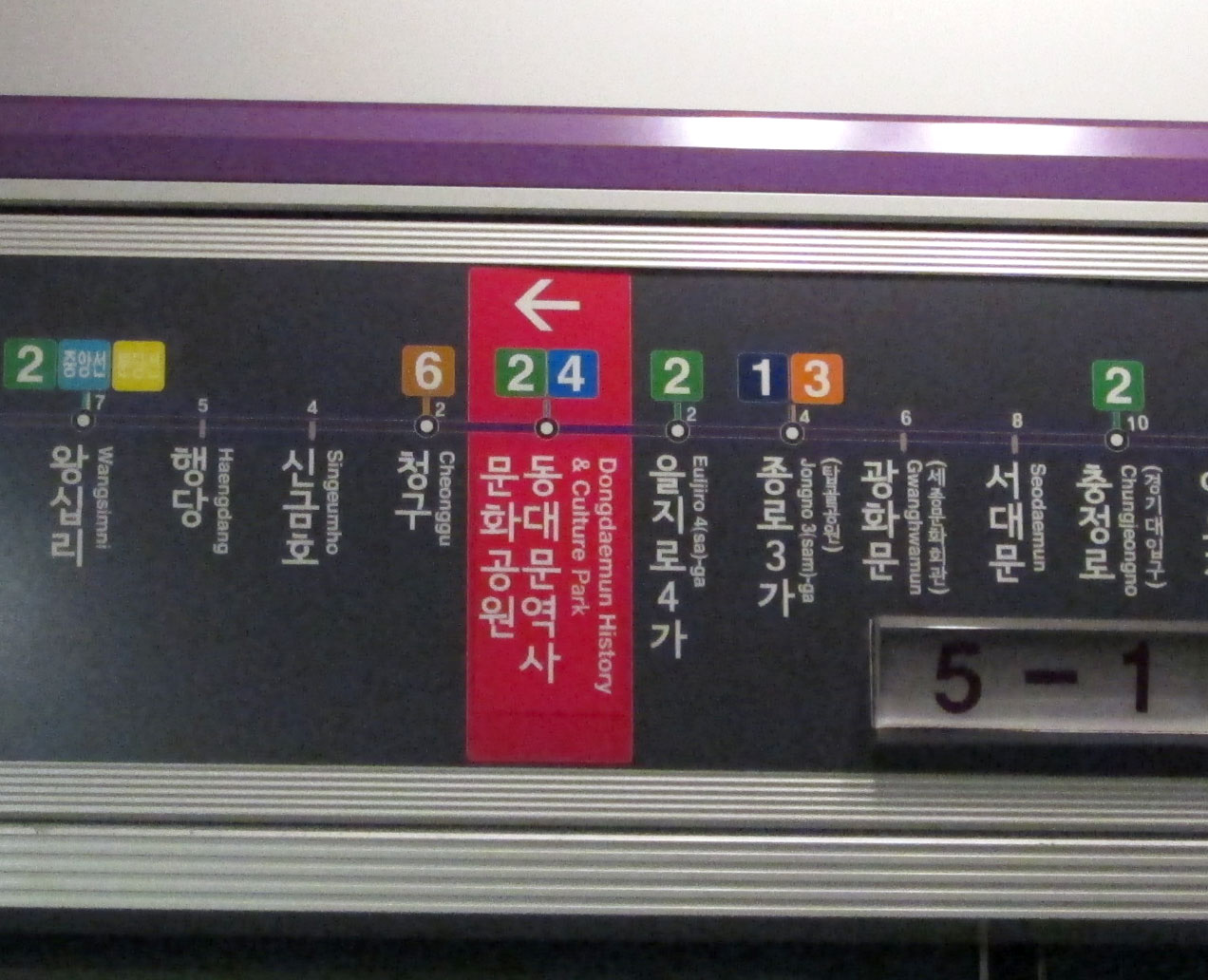
Signage in the Dongdaemun History and Culture Park SMRT station in Seoul. The Korean texts were written vertically. The sign 동대문역사문화공원 requires two columns which run from right to left.

In modern Korea, vertical writing is uncommon. Modern Korean is usually written horizontally from left to right. Vertical writing is used when the writing space is long vertically and narrow horizontally. For example, titles on the spines of books are usually written vertically. When a foreign language film is subtitled into Korean, the subtitles are sometimes written vertically at the right side of the screen.

In the standard language (표준어; 標準語) of South Korea, punctuation marks are used differently in horizontal and vertical writing. Western punctuation marks are used in horizontal writing and the Japanese punctuation marks are used in vertical writing. However, vertical writing using Western punctuation marks is sometimes found.

== In computing ==
Early computer installations were designed only to support left-to-right horizontal writing based on the Latin alphabet. Today, most computer programs do not fully support the vertical writing system; however, most advanced word processing and publication software that target the East Asian region support the vertical writing system either fully or to a limited extent.

Even though vertical text display is generally not well supported, composing vertical text for print has been made possible. For example, in Asian editions of Windows, Asian fonts are also available in a vertical version, with font names prefixed by "@". Users can compose and edit the document as normal horizontal text. When complete, changing the text font to a vertical font converts the document to vertical orientation for printing purposes. Additionally, OpenType also has valt, vert, vhal, vkna, vkrn, vpal, vrt2, vrtr "feature tags" to define glyphs that can be transformed or adjusted within vertical text; they can be enabled or disabled in CSS3 using font-feature-settings property.

=== Internet ===
Since the late 1990s, W3C (World Wide Web Consortium) has been drafting Cascading Style Sheets properties to enable display on the Web of the various languages of the world according to their heritage text directions. Their latest efforts in 2011 show some revisions to the previous format for the Writing Mode property which provides for vertical layout and text display. The format "writing-mode:tb-rl" has been revised as "writing-mode: vertical-rl" in CSS, but the former syntax was preserved as a part of SVG 1.1 specification.

Among Web browsers, Internet Explorer was the first one that had been supporting vertical text and layout coded in HTML. Starting with IE 5.5 in 2000, Microsoft has enabled the writing mode property as a "Microsoft extension to Cascading Style Sheets (CSS)". Google Chrome (since 8.0), Safari (since 5.1), Opera (since 15.0) has supported the -webkit-writing-mode property. Mozilla Firefox got support for unprefixed writing-mode property in version 38.0, later enabled by default in version 41.0. Starting with Google Chrome version 48 in 2016, the unprefixed writing-mode property is now also supported by Chromium browsers, with the exception of the sideways-lr and sideways-rl values.

== See also ==
- Bi-directional text – Text that contains both LTR and RTL text
- East Asian typography – Typesetting of Chinese characters (used in Chinese, Japanese, and (traditionally) Korean and Vietnamese)
- Genkō yōshi – Japanese manuscript paper
- Stroke order – Order of writing Chinese characters
- Writing system – Convention of symbols representing language
