= Ktsord =

Ktsord or Ktsourd (Armenian: Կցորդ; attachment) is the most ancient type of Armenian religious song.

It received its name from being "attached" to biblical psalms and blessings. They have been sung since 4th-5th centuries, and until the invention of the Armenian alphabet it was communicated orally. The first ktsords were generally short songs composed of three verses.
