= Armeno-Greek papyrus =

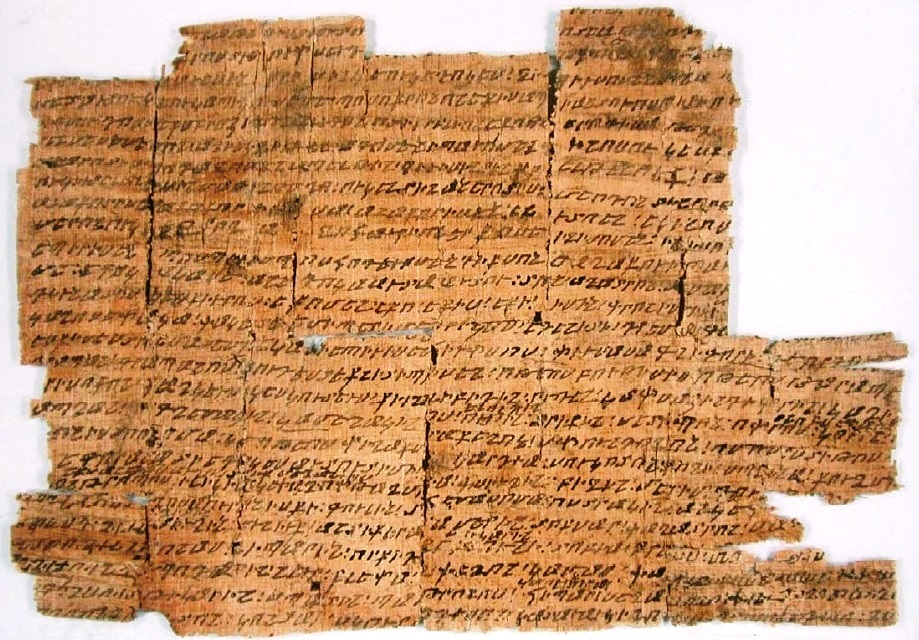
The Armeno-Greek papyrus, Bibliothèque nationale de France, ms. arm. 332

The Armeno-Greek papyrus is a manuscript from Egypt which bears Greek writing in Armenian letters. Its date is uncertain; it may be dated to the late sixth or early seventh century on historical grounds or the sixth or even late fifth century on paleographic grounds.

== Description ==
It is recognized as one of the most ancient, if not the most ancient, surviving examples of Armenian manuscript writing, predating the earliest dated Armenian books from the ninth century. The document is significant for the study of the early development of Armenian script styles.

Scholars agree that the author was an Armenian. H. Dashian suggested that the author was an Armenian merchant, while Maurice Leroy thought it was written by an Armenian soldier in the Byzantine army in Egypt practicing his Greek. The papyrus has about thirty lines of text on each side. The contents of the text can be divided into five groups: short conversational phrases; verb conjugations; word lists grouped by subject; very brief stories (chreiae) about the philosopher Diogenes; and maxims. According to James Clackson, the document belongs to the tradition of Greek educational texts written on papyri in Egypt.

The papyrus was acquired from an Arab dealer by Auguste Carrière, the chair of Armenian at the Institut national des langues et civilisations orientales in Paris, in or shortly before 1892. It was first studied in detail by H. Dashian in 1898. It was considered lost by 1937–1938, although study of the text continued on the basis of a photograph included in Dashian's study. It was rediscovered by historian Dickran Kouymjian in 1993 among uncatalogued Armenian manuscripts recently acquired by the Bibliothèque nationale de France. The first full edition of the text was published with commentary by James Clackson in 2000.

== Gallery ==
Black-and-white photos of fragments of the papyrus

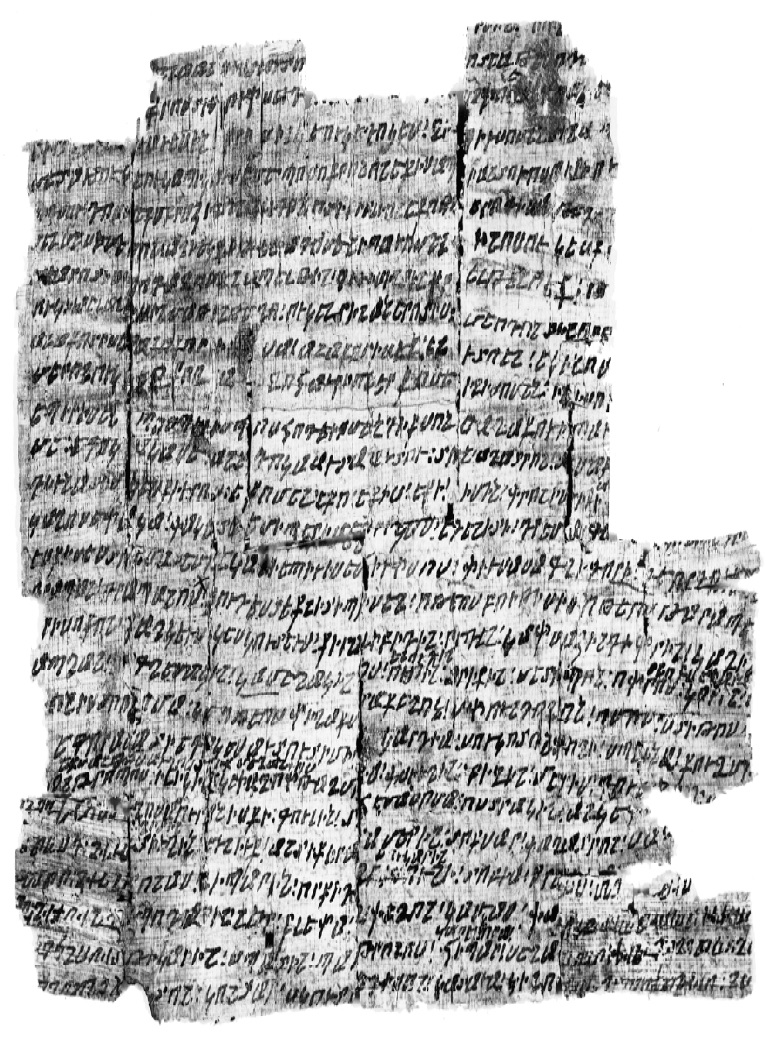

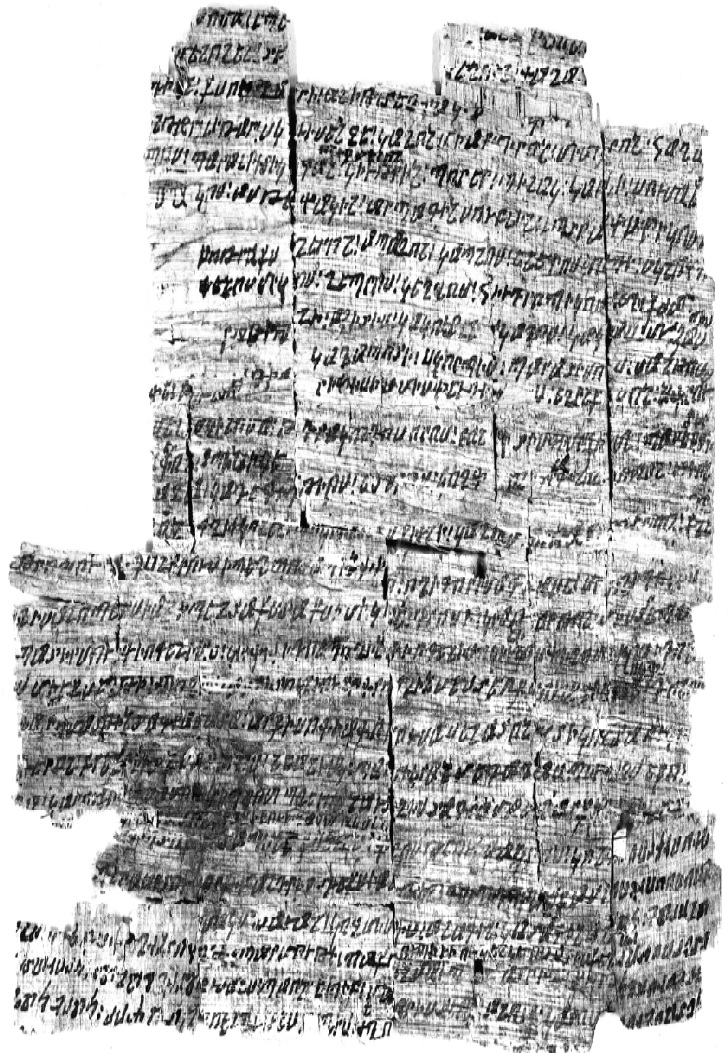

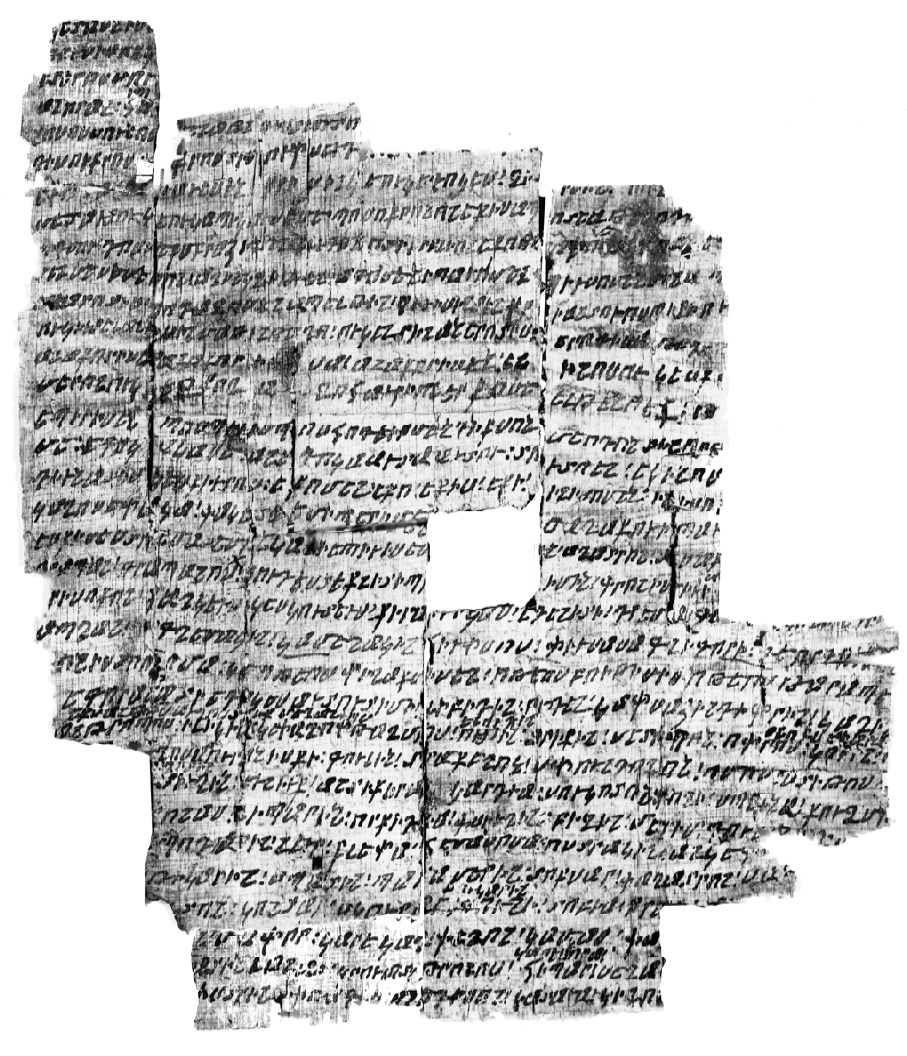

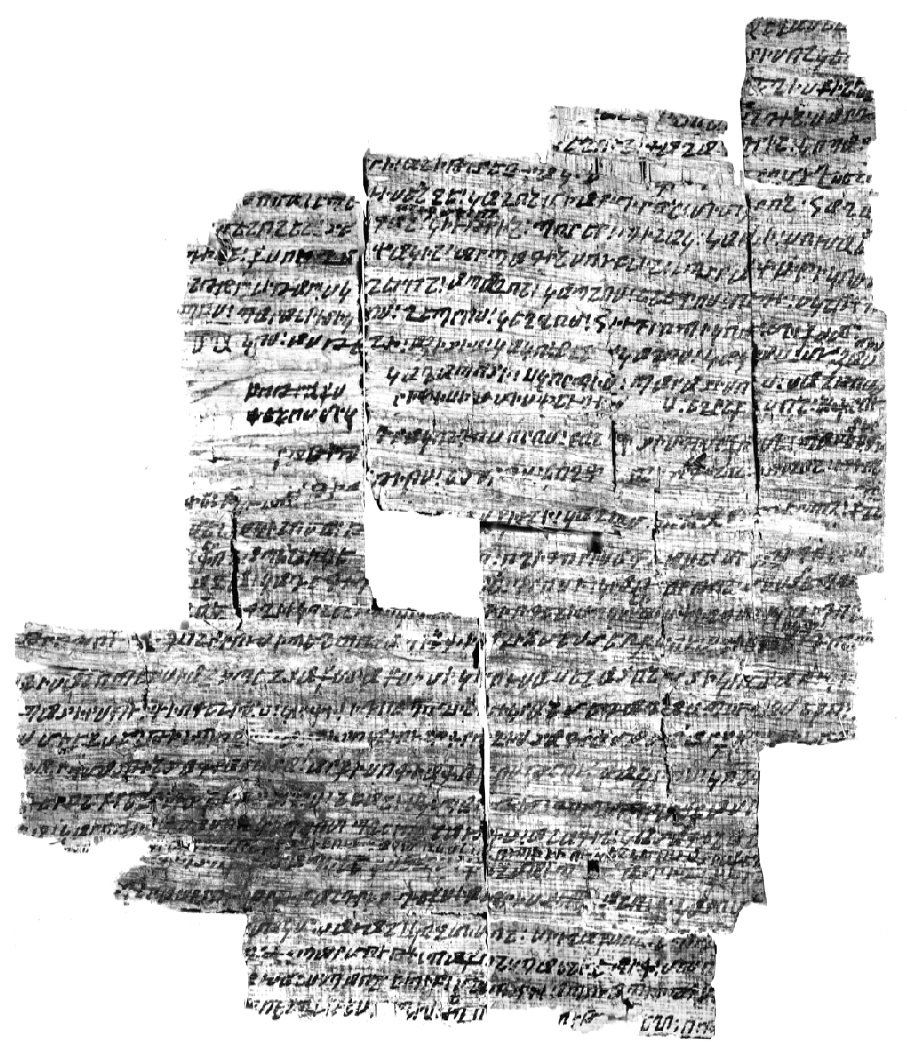
