= Ra (Armenian) =

Letter in the Armenian alphabet

- Ռ ռ

Usage
- Writing system: Armenian script
- Type: Alphabetic
- Language of origin: Armenian language
- Sound values: r, ɾ
- In Unicode: U+054C, U+057C
- Alphabetical position: 28

History
- Development: 𓁶: 𐤓; Ρ ρ; Ռ ռ
- Time period: 405 to present

Other
- Associated numbers: 1000
- Writing direction: Left-to-Right

Ra (majuscule: Ռ; minuscule: ռ; Armenian: ռա) is the twenty-eighth letter of the Armenian alphabet. It represents the voiced alveolar trill (/r/) in Eastern Armenian and the voiced alveolar tap (/ɾ/) in Western Armenian. Created by Mesrop Mashtots in the 5th century, it has a numerical value of 1000. Its shape is visually similar to the minuscule Latin letter N (n). Its shape in lowercase form is also similar to the majuscule form of the Greek letter Omega (Ω).

== Gallery ==
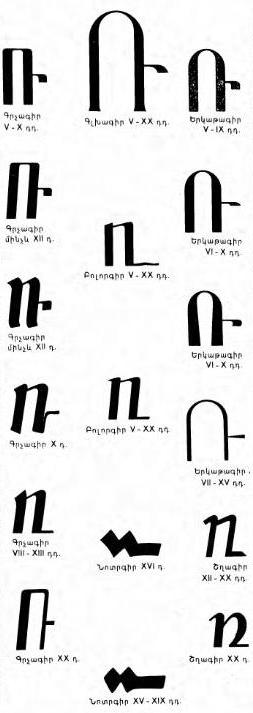
Various historic fonts

Rounded Erkat'agir

Angular Erkat'agir

Bolorgir

Notrgir

Shghagir

Typographic form

Handwritten form

== Computing codes ==
Character information
Preview	Ռ		ռ	
Unicode name	ARMENIAN CAPITAL LETTER RA		ARMENIAN SMALL LETTER RA	
Encodings	decimal	hex	dec	hex
Unicode	1356	U+054C	1404	U+057C
UTF-8	213 140	D5 8C	213 188	D5 BC
Numeric character reference	&#1356;	&#x54C;	&#1404;	&#x57C;

== See also ==
- Armenian alphabet
- Mesrop Mashtots
- R (Latin)
- Ω (Greek)
