= O (Armenian) =

Letter in the Armenian alphabet

- Օ օ

Usage
- Writing system: Armenian script
- Type: Alphabetic
- Language of origin: Armenian language
- Sound values: [o]
- In Unicode: U+0555, U+0585
- Alphabetical position: 37 (Classical); 38 (Reformed)

History
Development
D4
      - Ο ο
        - Օ օ

O or Oh (majuscule: Օ, minuscule: օ, Armenian: օ) is the 38th letter of the reformed Armenian alphabet and the 37th letter of the classical Armenian alphabet. This letter was first noticed in a text from the year 1046 at the word փափագանօք (p'ap'aganok', longing).

Unlike many Armenian letters, O has no numeric value. It represents the open-mid back rounded vowel /ɔ/ in both Eastern and Western Armenian.

== Computing codes ==
Character information
Preview	Օ		օ	
Unicode name	ARMENIAN CAPITAL LETTER OH		ARMENIAN SMALL LETTER OH	
Encodings	decimal	hex	dec	hex
Unicode	1365	U+0555	1413	U+0585
UTF-8	213 149	D5 95	214 133	D6 85
Numeric character reference	&#1365;	&#x555;	&#1413;	&#x585;

== Related characters and other similar characters ==
- O o : Latin letter O
- Ο ο : Greek letter Omicron
- О о : Cyrillic letter О
