= Men (letter) =

- Մ մ

Usage
- Writing system: Armenian script
- Type: Alphabetic
- Language of origin: Armenian language
- Sound values: m
- In Unicode: U+0544, U+0574
- Alphabetical position: 20

History
- Time period: 405 to present

Other
- Associated numbers: 200
- Writing direction: Left-to-Right

Men (majuscule: Մ; minuscule: մ; Armenian: մեն) is the twentieth letter of the Armenian alphabet, representing the bilabial nasal (/m/) in both Eastern and Western Armenian. It is typically romanized with the letter M. It was part of the alphabet created by Mesrop Mashtots in the 5th century CE. In the Armenian numeral system, it has a value of 200.

== Gallery ==
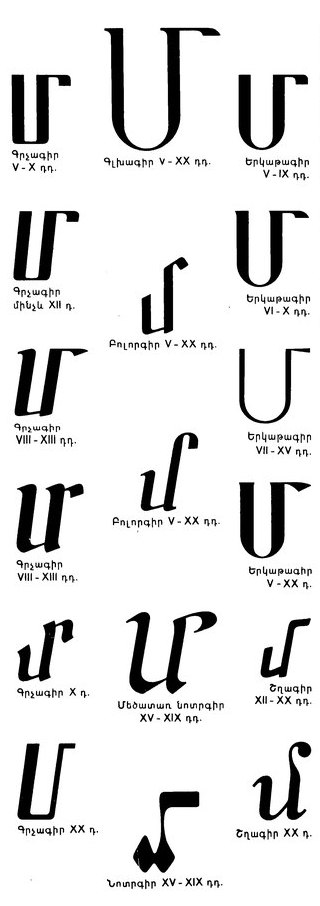
Various historic fonts

Rounded Erkat'agir

Angular Erkat'agir

Bolorgir

Notrgir

Shghagir

Typographic form

Handwritten form

== Character codes ==
Character information
Preview	Մ		մ	
Unicode name	ARMENIAN CAPITAL LETTER MEN		ARMENIAN SMALL LETTER MEN	
Encodings	decimal	hex	dec	hex
Unicode	1348	U+0544	1396	U+0574
UTF-8	213 132	D5 84	213 180	D5 B4
Numeric character reference	&#1348;	&#x544;	&#1396;	&#x574;

== See also ==
- Che, the letter preceding Men in the Armenian alphabet
- Armenian alphabet
