= K'e =

Letter in the Armenian alphabet

Ke
- Ք ք

Usage
- Writing system: Armenian script
- Type: Alphabetic
- Language of origin: Armenian language
- Sound values: kʰ
- In Unicode: U+0554, U+0584
- Alphabetical position: 36

History
- Development: Χ χ: Ⴕ ⴕ; Ք ք
- Time period: 405 to present

Other
- Associated numbers: 9000

Keh, or Kʼe (majuscule: Ք; minuscule: ք; Reformed orthography: քե; Classical orthography: քէ) is the thirty-sixth letter of the Armenian alphabet. It represents the voiceless aspirated velar plosive (/kʰ/) in both Eastern and Western varieties of Armenian. Created by Mesrop Mashtots in the 5th century, it has a numerical value of 9000. Its shape in lowercase form resembles to the Latin letter P (p), but stroked, and in cursive, the lowercase form resembles the letter ɬ (the voiceless alveolar lateral fricative).

== Gallery ==
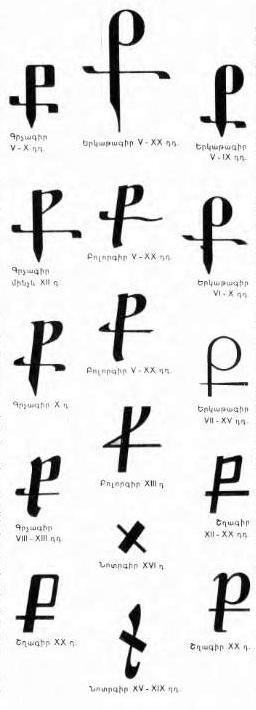
Various historic fonts

Rounded Erkat'agir

Angular Erkat'agir

Bolorgir

Notrgir

Shghagir

Typographic form

Handwritten form

== Computing codes ==
Character information
Preview	Ք		ք	
Unicode name	ARMENIAN CAPITAL LETTER KEH		ARMENIAN SMALL LETTER KEH	
Encodings	decimal	hex	dec	hex
Unicode	1364	U+0554	1412	U+0584
UTF-8	213 148	D5 94	214 132	D6 84
Numeric character reference	&#1364;	&#x554;	&#1412;	&#x584;

== See also ==
- K (Latin)
- P (Latin)
