= Armenian alphabet =

Alphabet used to write the Armenian language

Armenian
- Script type: Alphabet
- Creator: Mesrop Mashtots
- Period: AD 405 to present
- Direction: Left-to-right
- Official script: Armenia
- Languages: Armenian, Zok, Armeno-Tat, Kurmanji (Partial use) and Lomavren

Related scripts
- Parent systems: Egyptian hieroglyphs: Proto-Sinaitic script; Phoenician alphabet; Greek alphabet; Armenian
- Child systems: Armeno-Turkish; Caucasian Albanian
- Sister systems: Latin; Coptic; Cyrillic

ISO 15924
- ISO 15924: Armn (230), Armenian

Unicode
- Unicode alias: Armenian
- Unicode range: U+0530–U+058F Armenian; U+FB00–U+FB17 Alphabetic Pres. Forms

Armenian letter art and its cultural expressions
- UNESCO Intangible Cultural Heritage
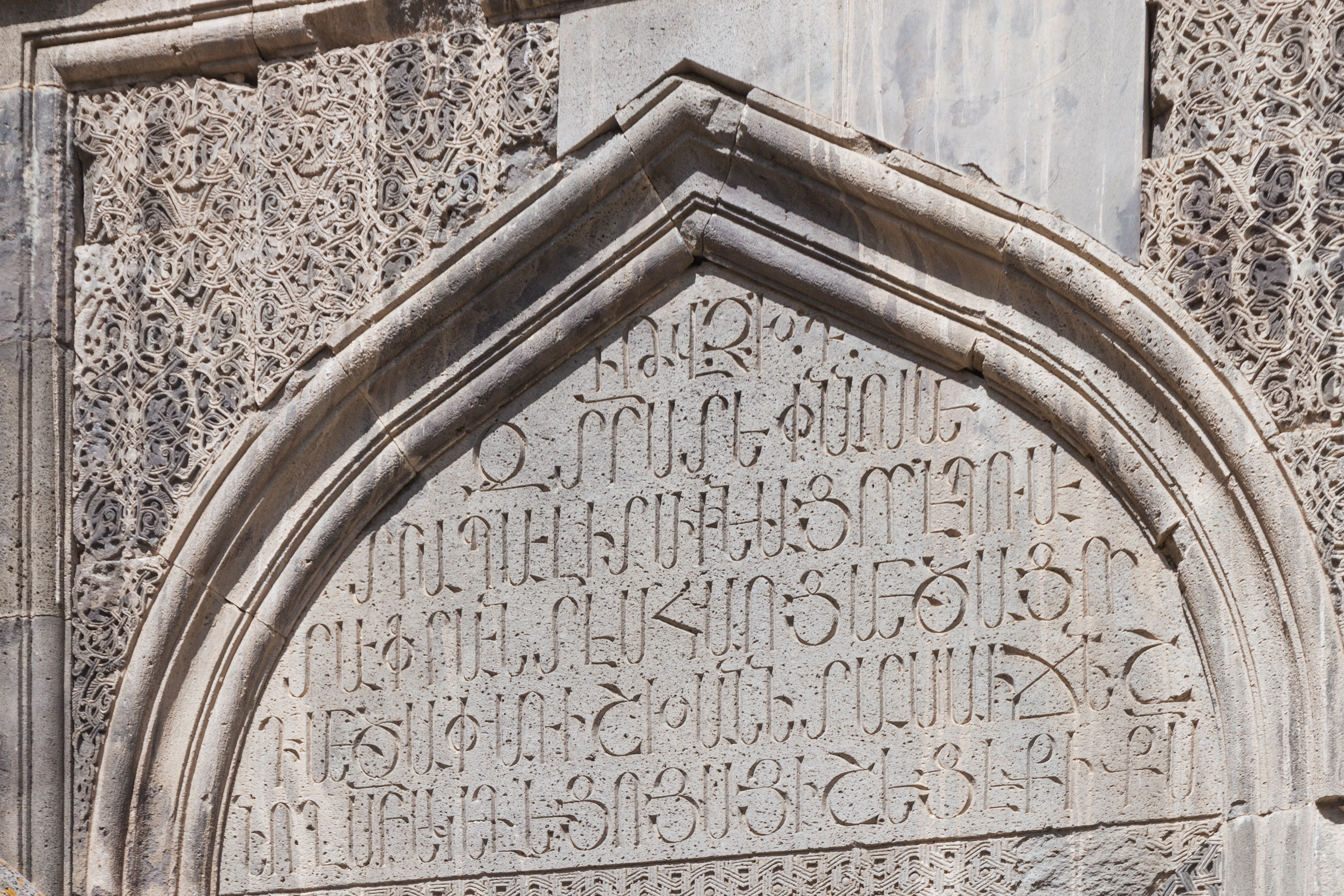
- Tatev Monastery, 8th century
- Country: Armenia
- Reference: 01513
- Region: Europe and North America

Inscription history
- Inscription: 2019 (14 session)
- List: Representative

The Armenian alphabet (Armenian: Հայոց գրեր, romanized: Hayocʼ grer or Հայոց այբուբեն, Hayocʼ aybuben) or, more broadly, the Armenian script, is an alphabetic writing system developed for Armenian and occasionally used to write other languages. It was developed around 405 AD by Mesrop Mashtots, an Armenian linguist and ecclesiastical leader. The script originally had 36 letters. Eventually, two more were adopted in the 13th century. In the reformed Armenian orthography (1920s), the ligature և, ev, is also treated as a letter, bringing the total number of letters to 39.

The Armenian word for 'alphabet' is այբուբեն, aybuben, named after the first two letters of the Armenian alphabet: ⟨Ա⟩ այբ, ayb, and ⟨Բ⟩ բեն, ben. Armenian is written horizontally, from left to right.

Eastern Armenian alphabet
Listen to the Eastern Armenian alphabet

Western Armenian alphabet
Listen to the Western Armenian alphabet

== History and development ==
=== Possible antecedents ===
One account of the existence of an Armenian alphabet before Mesrop Mashtots comes from the third century Roman theologian, Hippolytus of Rome (170–235), in his Chronicle, while writing about his contemporary, Emperor Severus Alexander (r. 222–235), mentions that the Armenians are amongst those nations who have their own distinct alphabet.

Philostratus the Athenian, a sophist of the second and third centuries, wrote:

And they say that a leopardess was once caught in Pamphylia which was wearing a chain round its neck, and the chain was of gold, and on it was inscribed in Armenian lettering: "The king Arsaces to the Nysian god".

According to the fifth-century Armenian historian Movses Khorenatsi, Bardesanes of Edessa (AD 154–222), who founded the Gnostic current of the Bardaisanites, went to the Armenian castle of Ani and there read the work of a pre-Christian Armenian priest named Voghyump, written in the Mithraic (Note: Alternatively, Mehean or Mihrean.) script of the Armenian temples, named after Mihr, the Armenian national god of light, truth, and the sun. In Voghyump's work, amongst other histories, an episode was noted of the Armenian King Tigranes VII (who reigned from 144 to 161, and again from AD 164–186) erecting a monument on the tomb of his brother, the Mithraic High Priest of the Kingdom of Greater Armenia, Mazhan. Movses of Khoren notes that Bardesanes translated this Armenian book into Syriac (Aramaic), and later also into Greek. Another important evidence for the existence of a pre-Mashtotsian alphabet is the fact that the pantheon of the ancient Armenians included Tir, who was the patron god of writing and science.

A 13th-century Armenian historian, Vardan Areveltsi, in his History, notes "that an Armenian script existed of old is attested" during the reign of King Leo the Magnificent (r. 1187–1219), after coins naming idolatrous kings were found stamped with the script.

The evidence that the Armenian scholars of the Middle Ages knew about the existence of a pre-Mashtotsian alphabet can also be found in other medieval works, including the first book composed in the Mashtotsian alphabet by the pupil of Mashtots, Koriwn, in the first half of the fifth century. Koriwn notes that Mashtots was told of the existence of ancient Armenian letters which he was initially trying to integrate into his own alphabet.

=== Creation by Mashtots ===
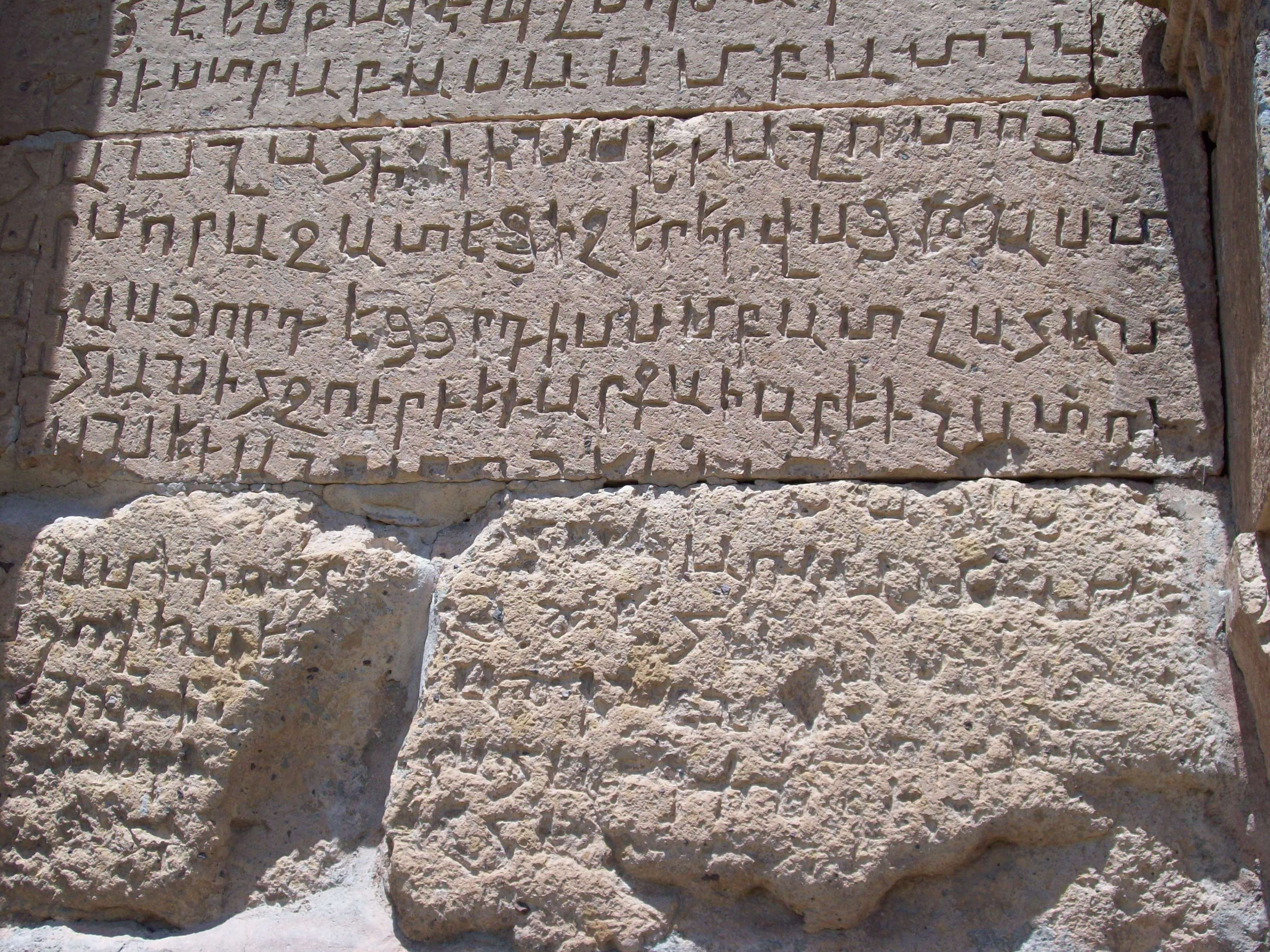
Armenian inscription from Yererouk Basilica, 5th century

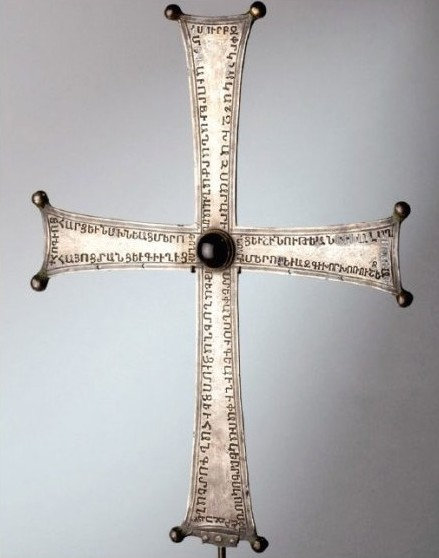
Armenian cross from Jerusalem, 5–6th centuries

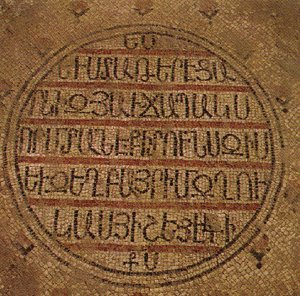
Armenian script-puzzle in Jerusalem. It is dated to the second half of the VII century

The Armenian alphabet was introduced by Mesrop Mashtots and Isaac of Armenia (Sahak Partev) in CE 405. Medieval Armenian sources also claim that Mashtots invented the Georgian and Caucasian Albanian alphabets around the same time. However, most scholars link the creation of the Georgian script to the process of Christianization of Iberia, a core Georgian kingdom of Kartli. The alphabet was therefore most probably created between the conversion of Iberia under Mirian III (326 or 337) and the Bir el Qutt inscriptions of 430, contemporaneously with the Armenian alphabet. Traditionally, the following phrase translated from Solomon's Book of Proverbs is said to be the first sentence to be written down in Armenian by Mashtots:

Ճանաչել զիմաստութիւն եւ զխրատ, իմանալ զբանս հանճարոյ:
Čanačʿel zimastutʿiun yev zxrat, imanal zbans hančaroy.
To know wisdom and instruction; to perceive the words of understanding.

— Book of Proverbs, 1:2.

Various scripts have been credited with being the prototype for the Armenian alphabet. Pahlavi was the priestly script in Armenia before the introduction of Christianity, and Syriac, along with Greek, was one of the alphabets of Christian scripture. Armenian shows some similarities to both. However, the general consensus is that Armenian is modeled after the Greek alphabet, supplemented with letters from a different source or sources for Armenian sounds not found in Greek. This is suggested by the Greek order of the Armenian alphabet; the ow ligature for the vowel /u/, as in Greek; the similarity of the letter ի /i/ in shape and sound value to Cyrillic Ии and (Modern) Greek Ηη; and the shapes of letters which "seem derived from a variety of cursive Greek", including Greek/Armenian pairs Θ/թ, Φ/փ, and Β/բ. It has been speculated by some scholars in African studies, following Dimitri Olderogge, that the Ge'ez script had an influence on certain letter shapes, but this has not been supported by any experts in Armenian studies.

The earliest known example of the script's usage was a dedicatory inscription over the west door of the church of Saint Sarkis in Tekor. Based on the known individuals mentioned in the inscription, it has been dated to the 480s. The earliest known surviving example of usage outside of Armenia is a mid-6th century mosaic inscription in the chapel of St Polyeuctos in Jerusalem. A papyrus discovered in 1892 at Fayyum and containing Greek words written in Armenian script has been dated on historical grounds to after the creation of the script, i.e. after 400, and on paleographic grounds between the 5th and 7th centuries. It is now in the Bibliotheque Nationale de France. The earliest surviving manuscripts written in Armenian using Armenian script date from the 9th–10th century.

=== Hands ===
There are four principal calligraphic hands of the script. Erkatagir, or 'ironclad letters', seen as Mesrop's original, was used in manuscripts from the 5th to 13th century and is still preferred for epigraphic inscriptions. Bolorgir, or 'cursive', was invented in the 10th century and became popular in the 13th. It has been the standard printed form since the 16th century. Notrgir, or 'minuscule', invented initially for speed, was extensively used in the Armenian diaspora in the 16th to 18th centuries, and later became popular in printing. Sheghagir, or 'slanted writing', is now the most common form.

=== Later development ===
Certain shifts in the language were at first not reflected in the orthography. The digraph աւ (au) followed by a consonant used to be pronounced [au] (as in luau) in Classical Armenian, but due to a sound shift it came to be pronounced [o], and has since the 13th century been written օ (ō). For example, classical աւր (awr, [auɹ], 'day') became pronounced [oɹ], and is now written օր (ōr). (One word has kept aw, now pronounced /av/: աղաւնի (ałavni) 'pigeon', and there are a few proper names still having aw before a consonant: Տաւրոս Tauros, Փաւստոս Faustos, etc.) For this reason, today there are native Armenian words beginning with the letter օ (ō) although this letter was taken from the Greek alphabet to write foreign words beginning with o [o].

The number and order of the letters have changed over time. In the Middle Ages, two new letters (օ [o], ֆ [f]) were introduced in order to better represent foreign sounds; this increased the number of letters from 36 to 38. From 1922 to 1924, Soviet Armenia adopted a reformed spelling of the Armenian language. The reform changed the digraph ու and the ligature և into two new letters, but it generally did not change the pronunciation of individual letters (see the footnotes of the chart). Those outside of the (former) Soviet sphere, including all Western Armenians as well as Eastern Armenians in Iran, have rejected the reformed spellings and continue to use the traditional Armenian orthography. They criticize some aspects of the reforms and allege political motives behind them.

== Alphabet ==
Forms	Name					Letter					Numerical value
Forms	Classical	Reformed	Pronunciation			Pronunciation			Transliteration		Numerical value
Forms	Classical	Reformed	Classical	Eastern	Western	Classical	Eastern	Western	Classical	ISO 9985	Numerical value
Ա • ա	այբ ayb		/ɑjb/		/ɑjpʰ/	/ɑ/			a		1
Բ • բ	բեն ben		/bɛn/		/pʰɛn/	/b/		/pʰ/	b		2
Գ • գ	գիմ gim		/ɡim/		/kʰim/	/ɡ/		/kʰ/	g		3
Դ • դ	դա da		/dɑ/		/tʰɑ/	/d/		/tʰ/	d		4
Ե • ե	եչ yečʼ		/ɛtʃʰ/	/jɛtʃʰ/		/ɛ/	/ɛ/, word-initially /jɛ/^{6}		e		5
Զ • զ	զա za		/zɑ/			/z/			z		6
Է • է	է ē^{1}		/e/	/ɛ/		/e/	/ɛ/		ê	ē	7
Ը • ը^{7}	ըթ ëtʼ		/ətʰ/			/ə/			ə	ë	8
Թ • թ	թո tʼo		/tʰɔ/			/tʰ/			t̔, tʿ	ṫ	9
Ժ • ժ	ժէ žē	ժե že	/ʒe/	/ʒɛ/		/ʒ/			ž		10
Ի • ի	ինի ini		/ini/			/i/			i		20
Լ • լ	լիւն liwn	լյուն lyun	/liwn/	/ljun/	/lʏn/	/l/			l		30
Խ • խ	խէ xē	խե xe	/χe/	/χɛ/		/χ/			x		40
Ծ • ծ	ծա ca		/tsɑ/		/dzɑ/	/ts/		/dz/	c	ç	50
Կ • կ	կեն ken		/kɛn/		/ɡɛn/	/k/		/ɡ/	k		60
Հ • հ	հո ho		/ho/			/h/			h		70
Ձ • ձ	ձա ja		/dzɑ/		/tsʰɑ/	/dz/		/tsʰ/	j		80
Ղ • ղ	ղատ ġat		/ɫɑt/	/ʁɑt/	/ʁɑd/	/ɫ/	/ʁ/		ł	ġ	90
Ճ • ճ	ճէ čē	ճե če	/tʃe/	/tʃɛ/	/dʒɛ/	/tʃ/		/dʒ/	č		100
Մ • մ	մեն men		/mɛn/			/m/			m		200
Յ • յ	յի yi	հի hi	/ji/	/hi/		/j/	/h/^{1}, /j/		y		300
Ն • ն	նու nu		/nu/			/n/, /ŋ/			n		400
Շ • շ	շա ša		/ʃɑ/			/ʃ/			š		500
Ո • ո	ո o	ո vo	/ɔ/	/ʋɔ/		/ɔ/	/ɔ/, word-initially /ʋɔ/^{2}		o		600
Չ • չ	չա čʼa		/tʃʰɑ/			/tʃʰ/			č̔, čʿ	ċ	700
Պ • պ	պէ pē	պե pe	/pe/	/pɛ/	/bɛ/	/p/		/b/	p		800
Ջ • ջ	ջէ ǰē	ջե ǰe	/dʒe/	/dʒɛ/	/tʃʰɛ/	/dʒ/		/tʃʰ/	ǰ		900
Ռ • ռ	ռա ṙa		/rɑ/		/ɾɑ/	/r/		/ɾ/	ṙ		1000
Ս • ս	սէ sē	սե se	/se/	/sɛ/		/s/			s		2000
Վ • վ	վեւ vew	վեվ vev	/wɛw/	/vɛv/		/w/	/v/		v		3000
Տ • տ	տիւն tiwn	տյուն tyun	/tiwn/	/tjun/	/dʏn/	/t/		/d/	t		4000
Ր • ր	րէ rē	րե re	/ɹe/	/ɾɛ/^{3}		/ɹ/	/ɾ/^{3}		r		5000
Ց • ց	ցո cʼo		/tsʰɔ/			/tsʰ/			c̔, cʿ	ć	6000
Ւ • ւ	հիւն hiwn	հյուն hyun, վյուն vyun^{5}	/hiwn/	/hjun/, /vjun/	/hʏn/	/w/	—	/v/^{5}	w		7000
Ու • ու	—	ու^{4} u	—	/u/	—	—	/u/	—	u	ow	-^{9}
Փ • փ	փիւր pʼiwr	փյուր p'yur	/pʰiwɹ/	/pʰjuɹ/	/pʰʏɾ/	/pʰ/			p̔, pʿ	ṕ	8000
Ք • ք	քէ kʼē	քե kʼe	/kʰe/	/kʰɛ/		/kʰ/			k̔, kʿ	ḱ	9000
Օ • օ	օ ò^{1}		—	/o/		—	/o/		ô	ò	-^{9}
Ֆ • ֆ	ֆէ fē	ֆե fe	—	/fɛ/		—	/f/		f		-^{9}
և	—	և^{4}^{,}^{8} yew	—	/jɛv/		—	/ɛv/, word-initially /jɛv/		ew		-^{9}

- Listen to the pronunciation of the letters in Eastern Armenian or in Western Armenian.

Notes:

1. Primarily used in classical orthography; after the reform used word-initially and in some compound words.
2. Except in ով /ɔv/ 'who' and ովքեր /ɔvkʰer/ 'those (people)' in Eastern Armenian.
3. Iranian Armenians (who speak a subbranch of Eastern Armenian) pronounce the sound represented by this letter with a retracted tongue body [ɹ̠]: post-alveolar rather than alveolar.
4. In classical orthography, ու and և are considered a digraph (ո + ւ) and a ligature (ե + ւ), respectively. In reformed orthography, they are separate letters of the alphabet: և is the 37th letter of the alphabet, and ու is the 34th letter, taking the place of ւ.
5. In reformed orthography, the letter ւ appears only as a component of ու. In classical orthography, the letter usually represents /v/, except in the digraph իւ /ju/. The spelling reform in Soviet Armenia replaced իւ with the trigraph յու.
6. Except in the present tense of 'to be': եմ /ɛm/ 'I am', ես /ɛs/ 'you are (sing.)', ենք /ɛnkʰ/ 'we are', եք /ɛkʰ/ 'you are (pl.)', են /ɛn/ 'they are'.
7. The letter ը is generally used only at the start or end of a word, and so the sound /ə/ is typically unwritten between consonants. One exception is մըն /mən/ (Western Armenian indefinite article, when followed by a word beginning with a vowel), e.g., մէյ մըն ալ /mɛj mən ɑl/ 'one more time'.
8. The ligature և has no majuscule form; when capitalized it is written as two letters Եւ (classical) or Եվ (reformed).
9. By the time this lowercase was included (Armenian alphabet reform of 1922–24 in the Soviet Union) in the alphabet, counting was conducted with Arabic numbers. Numbers over 9999 were achieved by putting a line over smaller letters-numerals

=== Handwritten forms ===
In handwriting, the upper- and lower-case letters look more similar than they do in print, and the stroke order is more apparent.

ա

բ

գ

դ

ե

զ

է

ը

թ

ժ

ի

լ

խ

ծ

կ

հ

ձ

ղ

ճ

մ

յ

ն

շ

ո

չ

պ

ջ

ռ

ս

վ

տ

ր

ց

ու

փ

ք

օ

ֆ

և

=== Ligatures ===
Ancient Armenian manuscripts used many ligatures. a commonly used ligature is և (composed of ե and ւ). Armenian print typefaces also include many ligatures. In the new orthography, the character և is no longer a typographical ligature, but a distinct letter, placed in the new alphabetic sequence, before "o".

== Punctuation ==
The word Աստուած Astuac 'God' abbreviated. Only the first and last letters, and the abbreviation mark ⟨՟⟩, are written.

=== Armenian punctuation marks outside a word ===
- « » – The čakertner are used as ordinary quotation marks. They are placed like French guillemets, just above the baseline (preferably vertically centered in the middle of the x-height of Armenian lowercase letters). They can be angled or rounded. The computer-induced use of English-style single or double quotes (vertical, diagonal or curly forms, placed above the baseline near the M-height of uppercase or tall lowercase letters and at the same level as accents) is strongly discouraged in Armenian as they look too much like other – unrelated – Armenian punctuation marks.
- , – The storaket is used as a comma, and placed as in English.
- ՝ – The but' (which looks like a comma-shaped reversed apostrophe) is used as a short stop, and placed in the same manner as the semicolon to indicate a pause that is longer than that of a comma, but shorter than that of a colon; in many texts it is replaced by the single opening single quote (a 6-shaped, or mirrored 9-shaped, or descending-wedge-shaped elevated comma), or by a spacing grave accent.
- ․ – The mijaket (whose single dot on the baseline looks like a Latin full stop) is used like an ordinary colon, mainly to separate two closely related (but still independent) clauses, or when a long list of items follows.
- ։ – The verjaket (whose vertically stacked two dots look like a Latin colon) is used as the ordinary full stop, and placed at the end of the sentence (many texts in Armenian replace the verjaket by the Latin colon as the difference is almost invisible at low resolution for normal texts, but the difference may be visible in headings and titles as the dots are often thicker to match the same optical weight as vertical strokes of letters, the dots filling the common x-height of Armenian letters).

The following Armenian punctuation marks are placed above and slightly to the right of the vowel whose tone is modified in order to reflect intonation:

- ՜ – The batsaganchakan nshan (which looks like a diagonally rising tilde) is used as an exclamation mark.
- ՛ – The shesht (which looks like a non-spacing acute accent) is used as an emphasis mark.
- ՞ – The hartsakan nshan is used as a question mark.

For an example of these, see the following sentence, with the shesht making emphasis in the vocative in the last word and the hartsakan nshan in the first, with the verjaket as a full stop at the end:

Ի՞նչ եք անում, տիկի՛ն:
I?nčʻ ekʻ anum, tikín:
What are you doing, ma'am?

=== Armenian punctuation marks used inside a word ===
- ֊ – The yent'amna is used as the ordinary Armenian hyphen.
- ՟ – The pativ used to be used as an Armenian abbreviation mark, and was placed on top of an abbreviated word to indicate that it was abbreviated. It is now obsolete.
- ՚ – The apat'arts is used as a spacing apostrophe (which looks either like a vertical stick or wedge pointing down, or like an elevated 9-shaped comma, or like a small, superscript left-to-right closing parenthesis or half ring) in Western Armenian only, to indicate elision of a vowel, usually /ə/.

== Transliteration ==
ISO 9985 (1996) transliterates the Armenian alphabet for modern Armenian as follows:

ա	բ	գ	դ	ե	զ	է	ը	թ	ժ	ի	լ	խ	ծ	կ	հ	ձ	ղ	ճ	մ
a	b	g	d	e	z	ē	ë	ṫ	ž	i	l	x	ç	k	h	j	ġ	č	m
յ	ն	շ	ո	չ	պ	ջ	ռ	ս	վ	տ	ր	ց	ւ	փ	ք	օ	ֆ	ու	և
y	n	š	o	ċ	p	ǰ	ṙ	s	v	t	r	ć	w	ṕ	ḱ	ò	f	ow	ew

In the linguistic literature on Classical Armenian, slightly different systems are in use.

ա	բ	գ	դ	ե	զ	է	ը	թ	ժ	ի	լ	խ	ծ	կ	հ	ձ	ղ	ճ	մ
a	b	g	d	e	z	ê	ə	tʽ	ž	i	l	x	c	k	h	j	ł	č	m
յ	ն	շ	ո	չ	պ	ջ	ռ	ս	վ	տ	ր	ց	ւ	փ	ք	օ	եւ	ու	ֆ
y	n	š	o	čʽ	p	ǰ	ṙ	s	v	t	r	cʽ	w	pʽ	kʽ	ô	ew	u	f

== Use for other languages ==
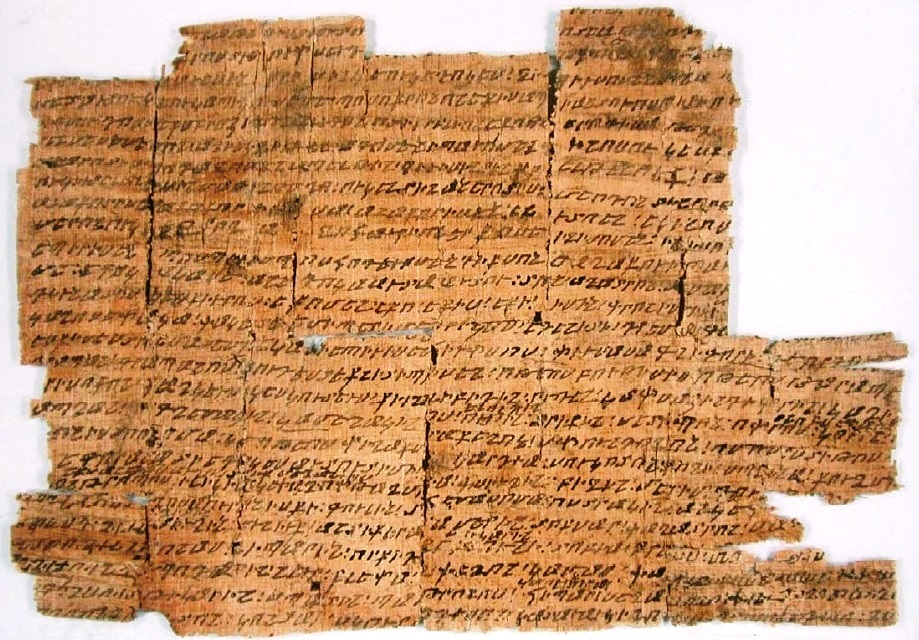
Armeno-Greek papyrus, 5-6th century

For about 250 years, from the early 18th century until around 1950, more than 2,000 books in the Turkish language were printed using the Armenian alphabet. Not only did Armenians read this Turkish in Armenian script, so did the non-Armenian (including the Ottoman Turkish) elite. An American correspondent in Marash in 1864 calls the alphabet "Armeno-Turkish", describing it as consisting of 31 Armenian letters and "infinitely superior" to the Arabic or Greek alphabets for rendering Turkish. This Armenian script was used alongside the Arabic script on official documents of the Ottoman Empire written in Ottoman Turkish. For instance, the first novel to be written in Turkish in the Ottoman Empire was Hovsep Vartanian's 1851 Akabi Hikayesi (Akabi's Story), written in the Armenian script. When the Armenian Duzian family managed the Ottoman mint during the reign of Abdülmecid I, they kept records in Armenian script but in the Turkish language. From the middle of the 19th century, the Armenian alphabet was also used for books written in the Kurdish language in the Ottoman Empire.

The Armenian script was also used by Turkish-speaking assimilated Armenians between the 1840s and 1890s. Constantinople was the main center of Armenian-scripted Turkish press. This portion of the Armenian press declined in the early twentieth century but continued until the Armenian genocide of 1915.

In areas inhabited by both Armenians and Assyrians, Syriac texts were occasionally written in the Armenian script, although the opposite phenomenon, Armenian texts written in Serto, the Western Syriac script, is more common.

The Kipchak-speaking Armenian Christians of Podolia and Galicia used an Armenian alphabet to produce an extensive amount of literature between 1524 and 1669.

The Armenian script, along with the Georgian, was used by the poet Sayat-Nova in his Armenian poems.

An Armenian alphabet was an official script for the Kurdish language in 1921–1928 in Soviet Armenia.

The Armeno-Tats, who have historically spoken Tat, wrote their language in the Armenian alphabet.

== Character encodings ==
The Armenian alphabet was added to the Unicode Standard in version 1.0, in October 1991. It is assigned the range U+0530–058F. Five Armenian ligatures are encoded in the "Alphabetic presentation forms" block (code point range U+FB13–FB17).

On 15 June 2011, the Unicode Technical Committee (UTC) accepted the Armenian dram sign for inclusion in the future versions of the Unicode Standard and assigned a code for the sign – U+058F (֏). In 2012 the sign was finally adopted in the Armenian block of ISO and Unicode international standards.

The Armenian eternity sign, since 2013, is assigned Unicode U+058D (֍ – RIGHT-FACING ARMENIAN ETERNITY SIGN) and, for its left-facing variant. u+058E (֎ – LEFT-FACING ARMENIAN ETERNITY SIGN).

Armenian^{[1]}^{[2]} Official Unicode Consortium code chart (PDF)
	0	1	2	3	4	5	6	7	8	9	A	B	C	D	E	F
U+053x		Ա	Բ	Գ	Դ	Ե	Զ	Է	Ը	Թ	Ժ	Ի	Լ	Խ	Ծ	Կ
U+054x	Հ	Ձ	Ղ	Ճ	Մ	Յ	Ն	Շ	Ո	Չ	Պ	Ջ	Ռ	Ս	Վ	Տ
U+055x	Ր	Ց	Ւ	Փ	Ք	Օ	Ֆ		՘	ՙ	՚	՛	՜	՝	՞	՟
U+056x	ՠ	ա	բ	գ	դ	ե	զ	է	ը	թ	ժ	ի	լ	խ	ծ	կ
U+057x	հ	ձ	ղ	ճ	մ	յ	ն	շ	ո	չ	պ	ջ	ռ	ս	վ	տ
U+058x	ր	ց	ւ	փ	ք	օ	ֆ	և	ֈ	։	֊	֋	֌	֍	֎	֏
Notes 1.As of Unicode version 18.0 2.Grey areas indicate non-assigned code points

Armenian subset of Alphabetic Presentation Forms^{[1]} Official Unicode Consortium code chart (PDF)
	0	1	2	3	4	5	6	7	8	9	A	B	C	D	E	F
U+FB1x				ﬓ	ﬔ	ﬕ	ﬖ	ﬗ	(U+FB00–FB12, U+FB18–FB4F omitted)							
Notes 1.As of Unicode version 18.0

== Keyboard layouts ==
The phonetic keyboard layout is the most common Armenian keyboard layout, enjoying broad support across modern operating systems. Because there are more characters in the Armenian alphabet (39) than in Latin (26), some Armenian characters appear on non-alphabetic keys on a conventional QWERTY keyboard (for example, շ maps to ,).

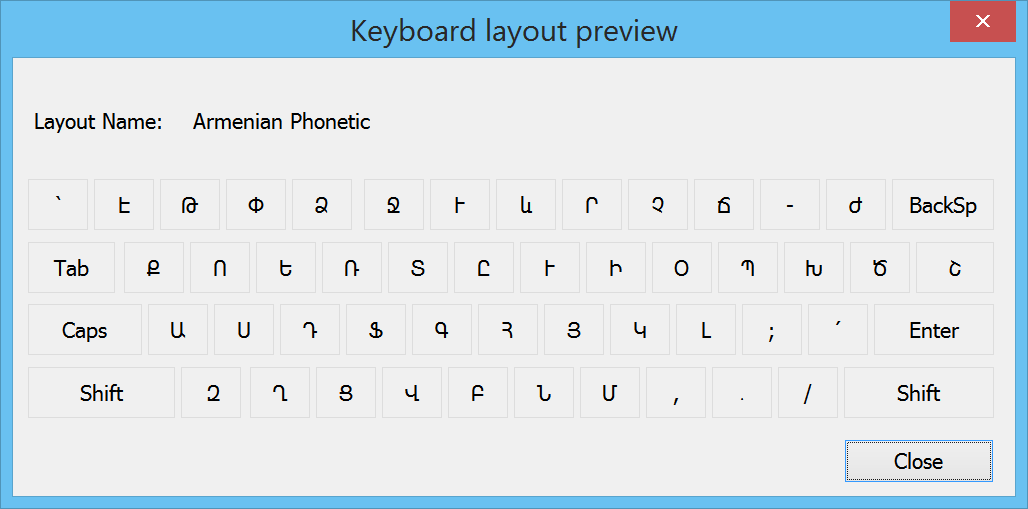
Armenian phonetic keyboard layout.

The phonetic layout is not very performant, due to the letter frequency difference between the Armenian and English languages, although it is easier to learn and use.

== Gallery ==
=== Armenian scripts in various churches ===
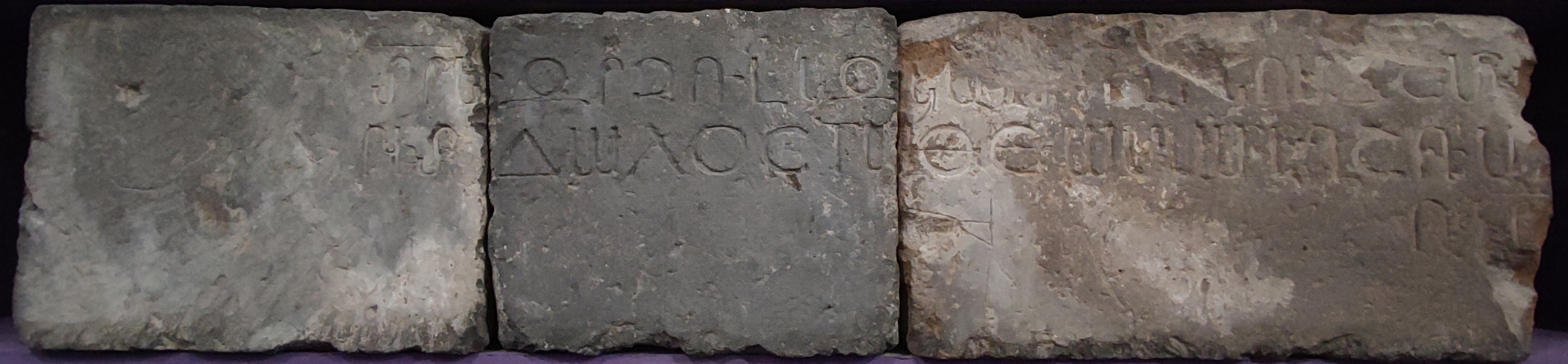
Bilingual Armenian-Greek inscription now kept at the History Museum of Armenia, 6th century

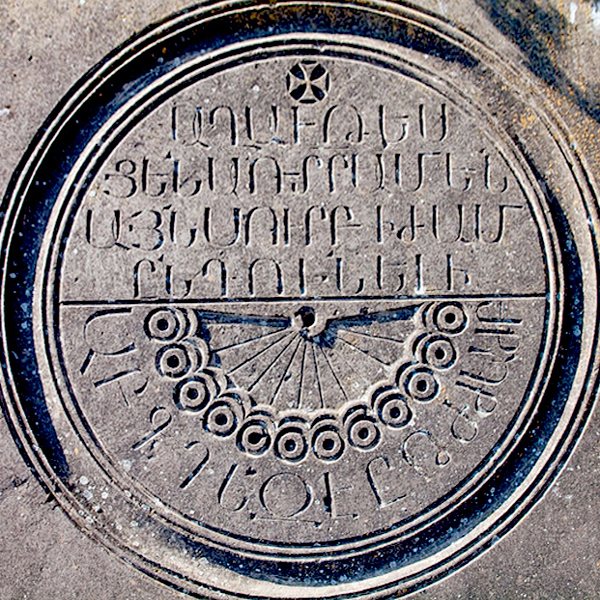
Sundial in Zvartnots, 7th century

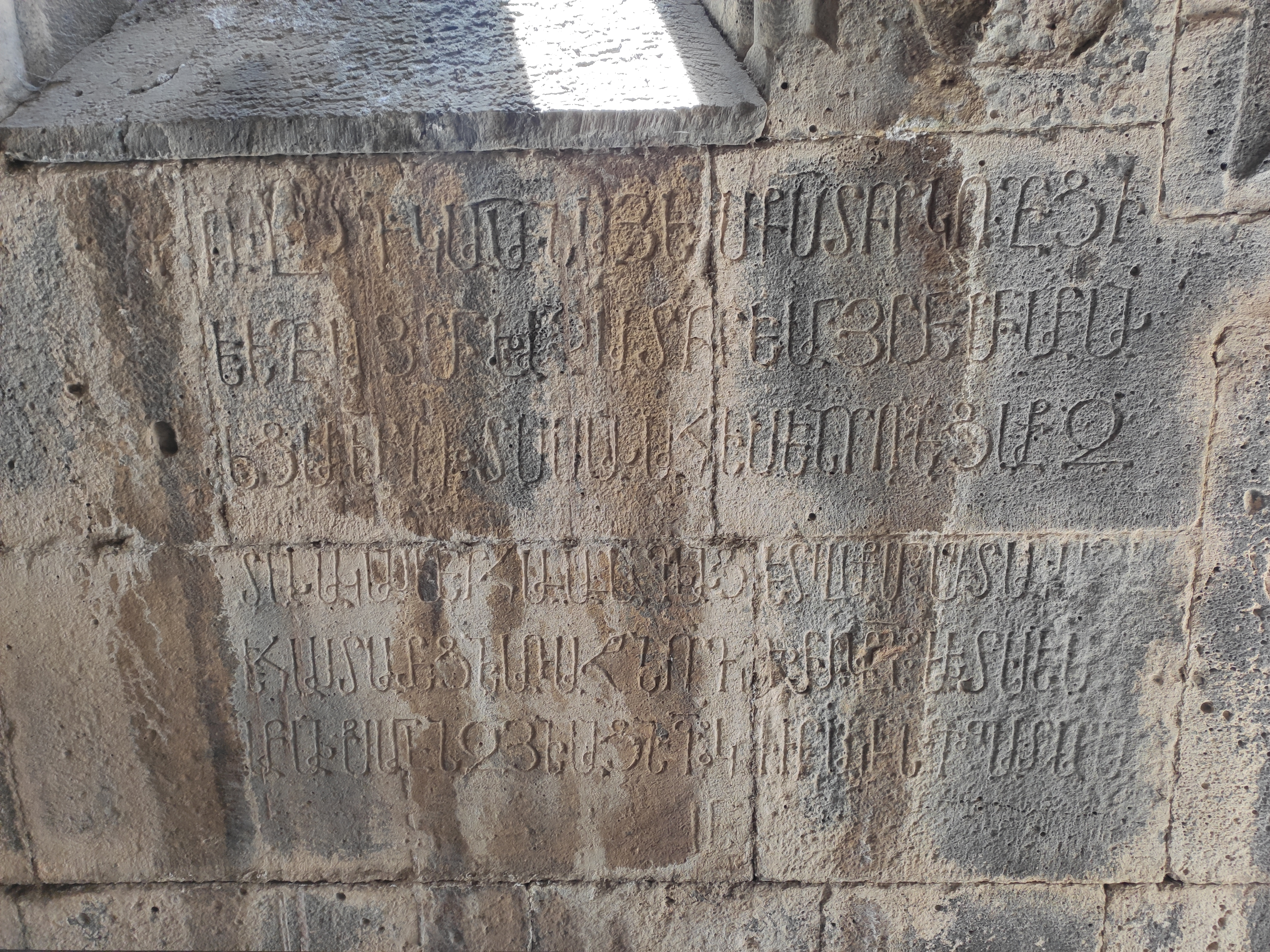
Sanahin Monastery, 10th century

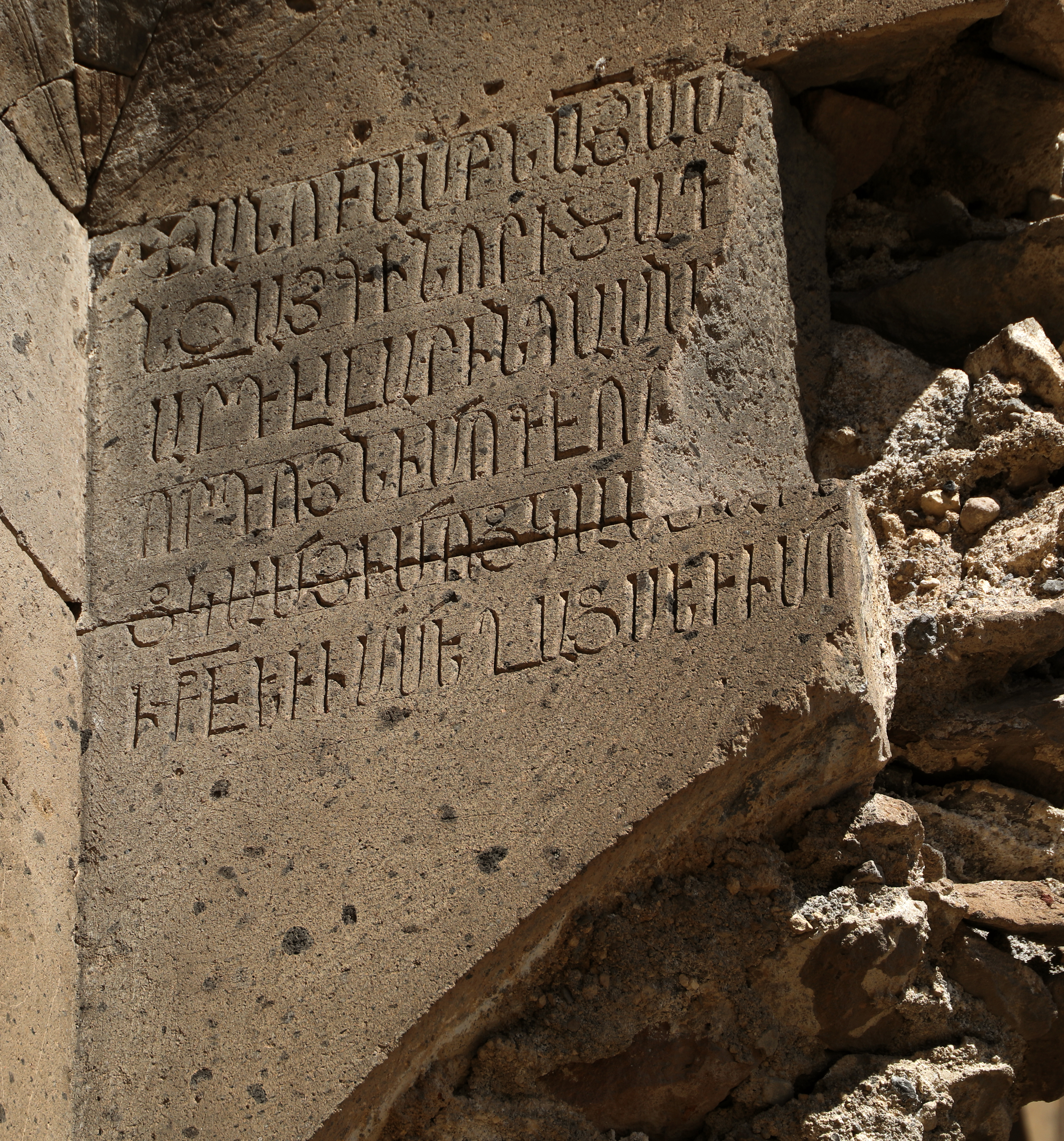
Ani Cathedral, 10th century

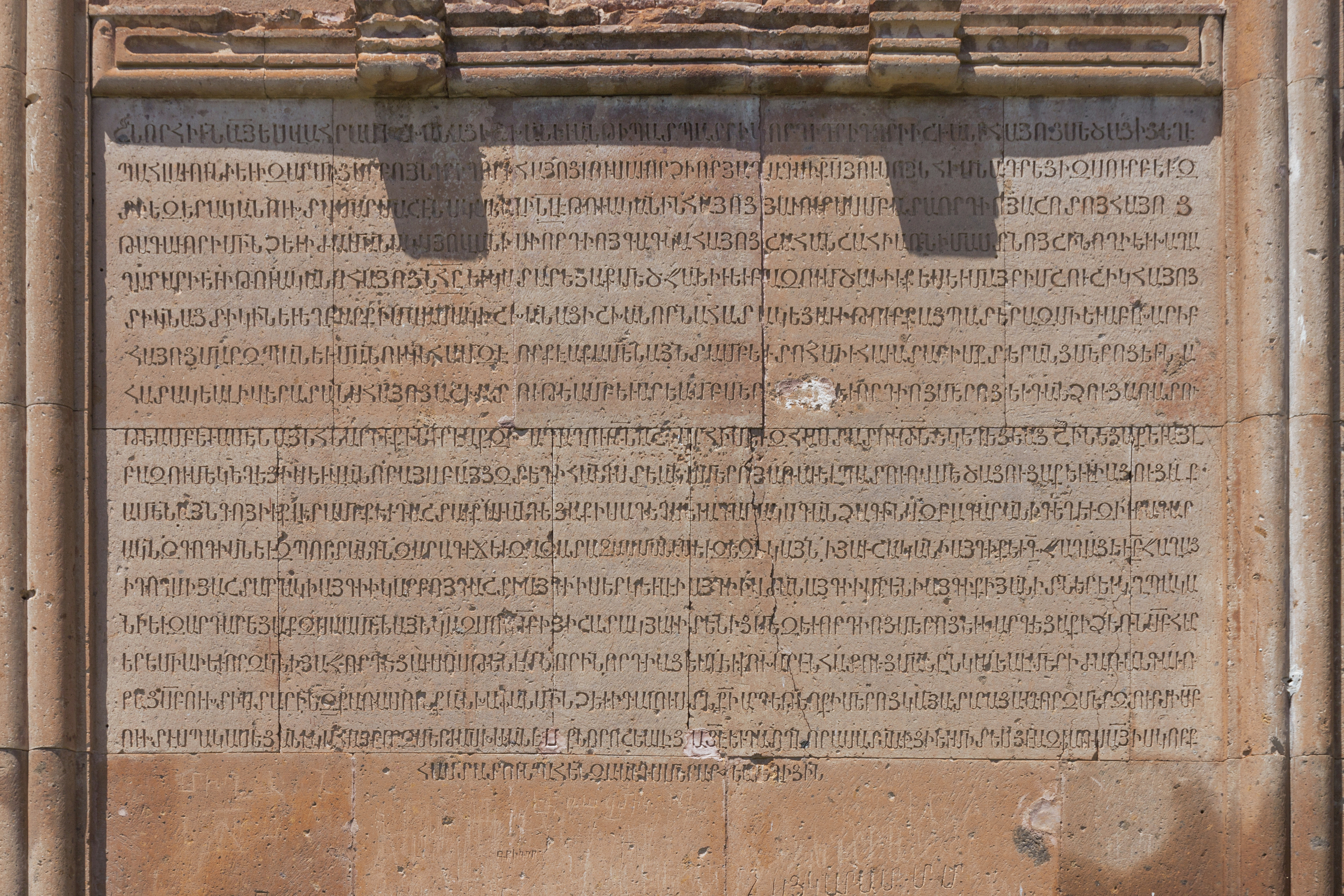
Marmashen Monastery, 11th century

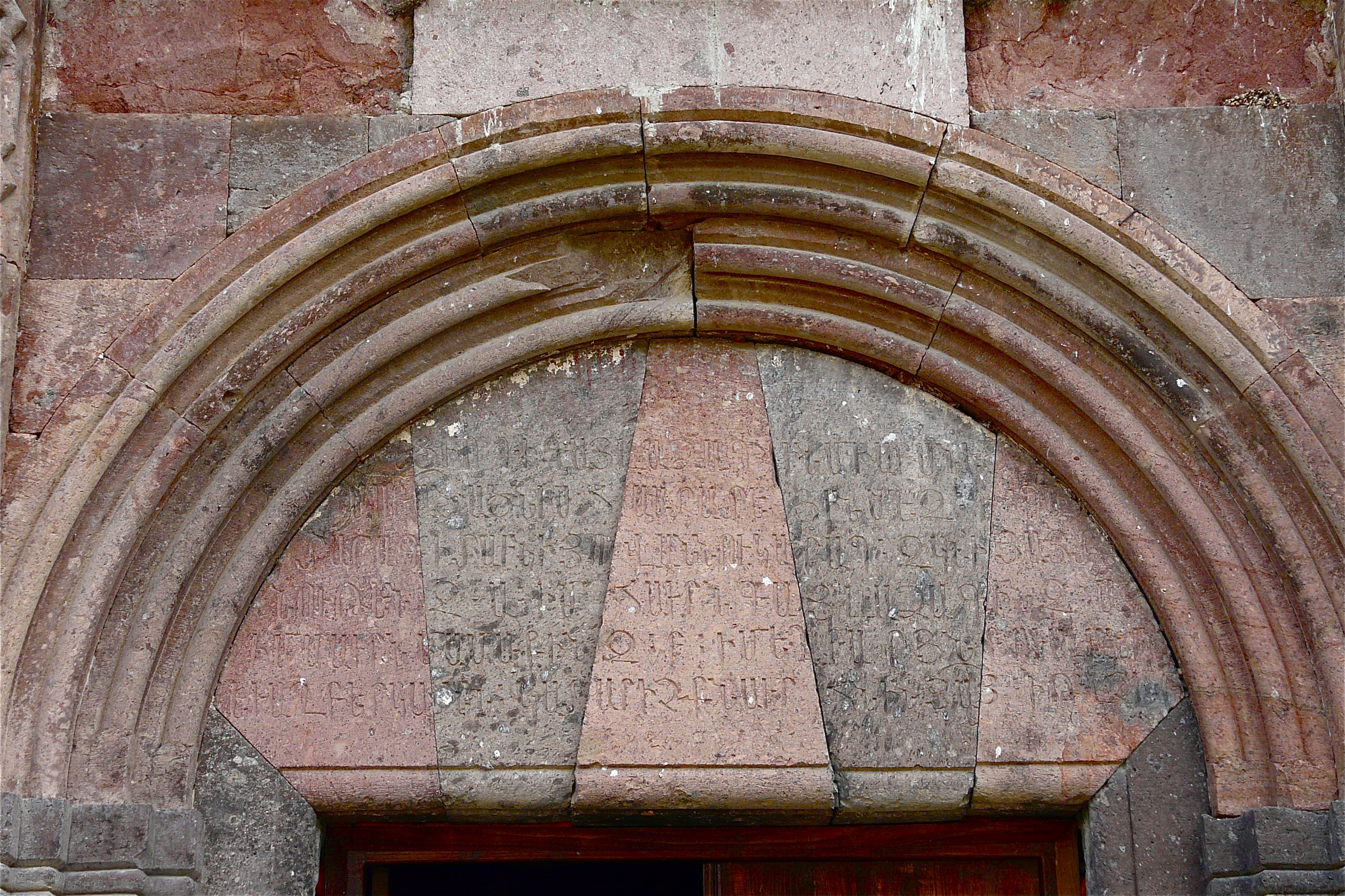
Goshavank, 12th century

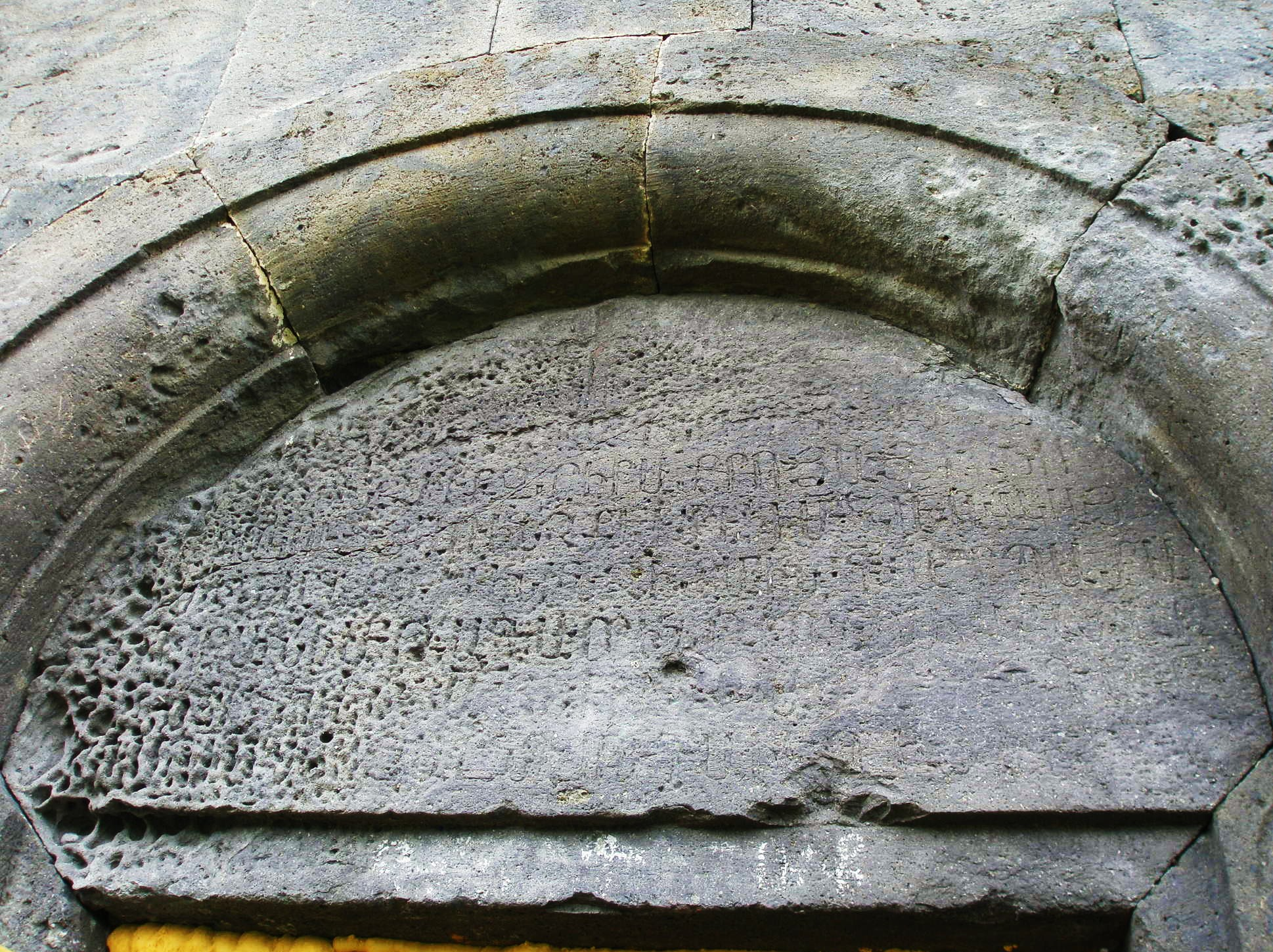
Hayravank, 12th century

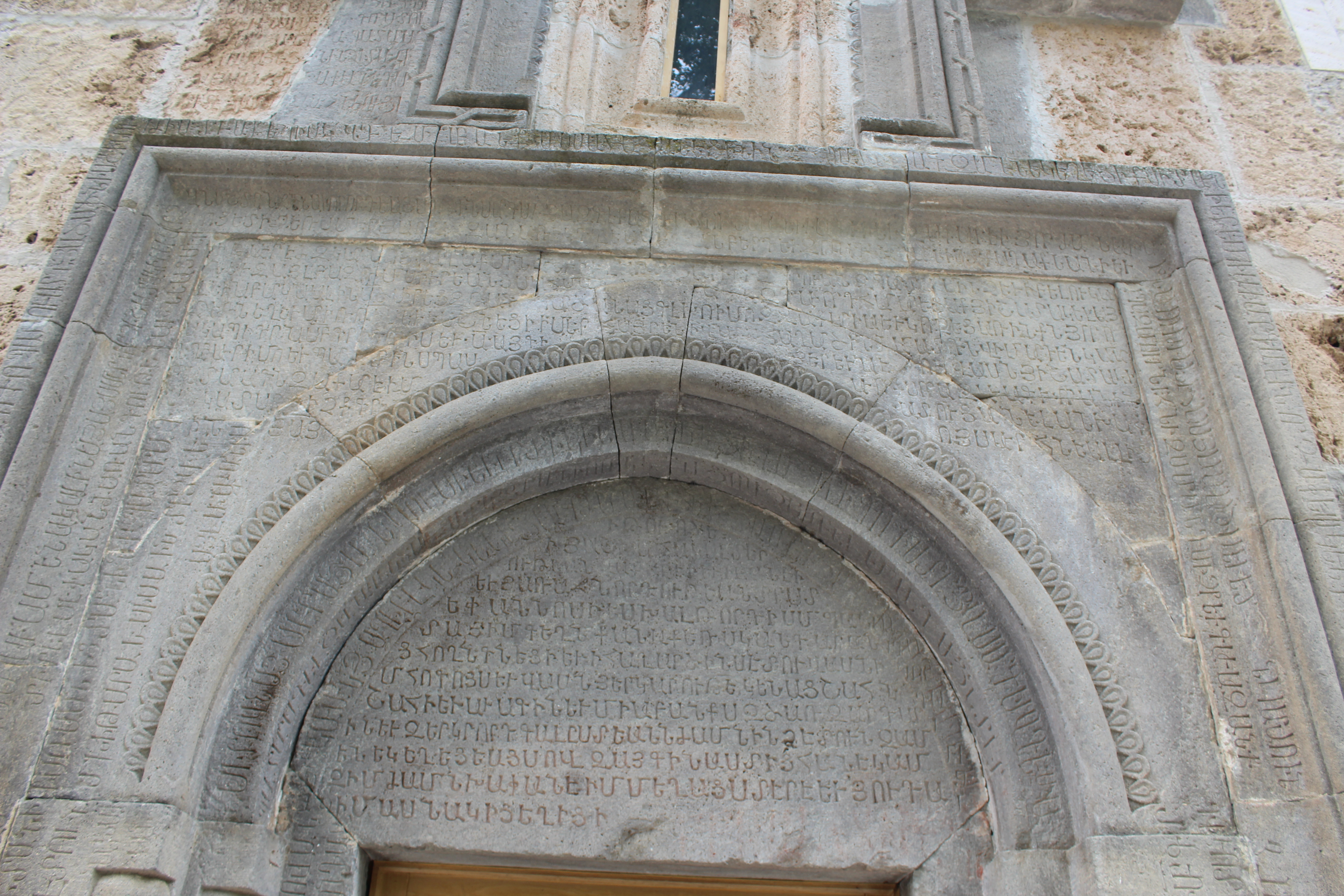
Haghartsin Monastery, 13th century

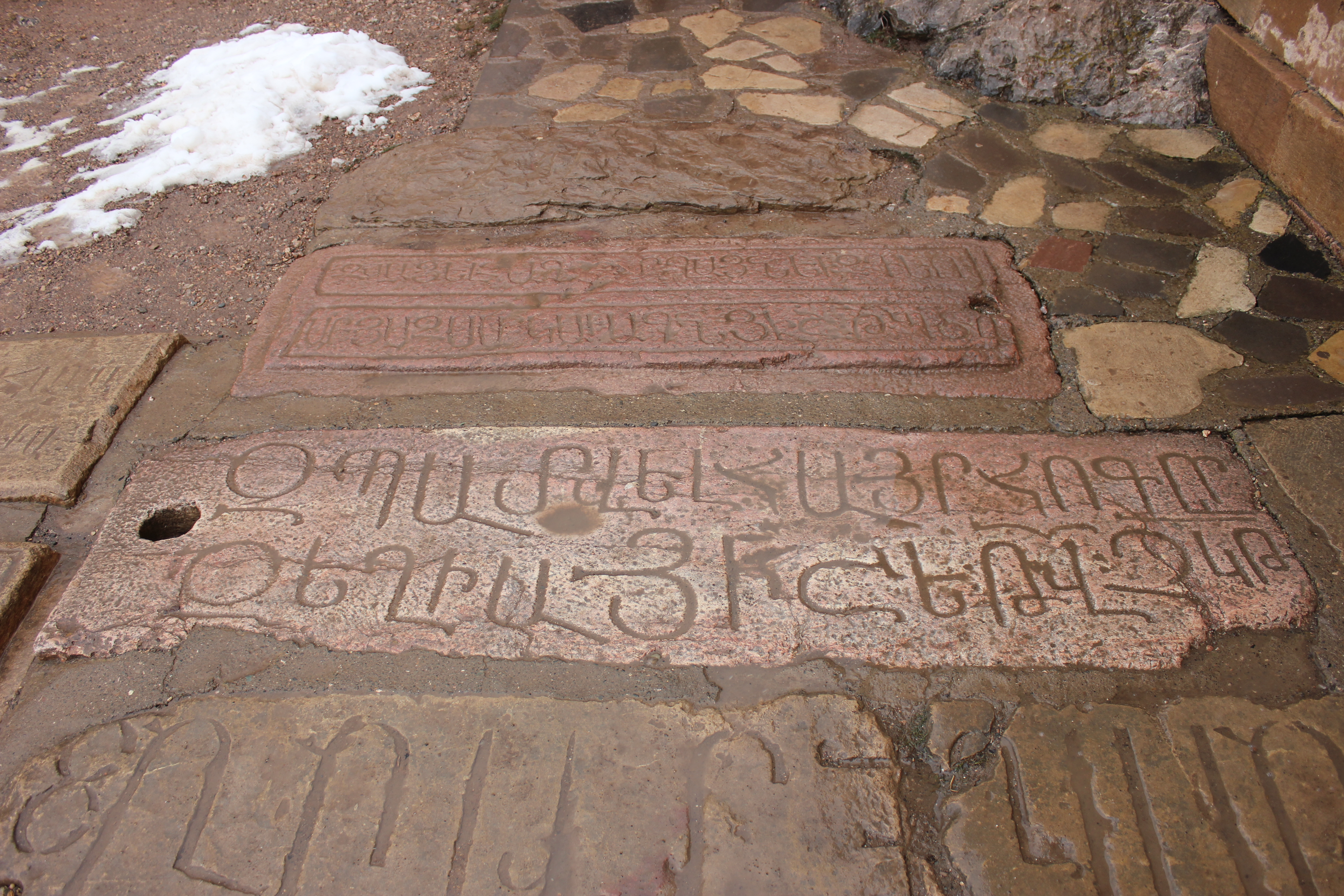
Noravank, 13th century

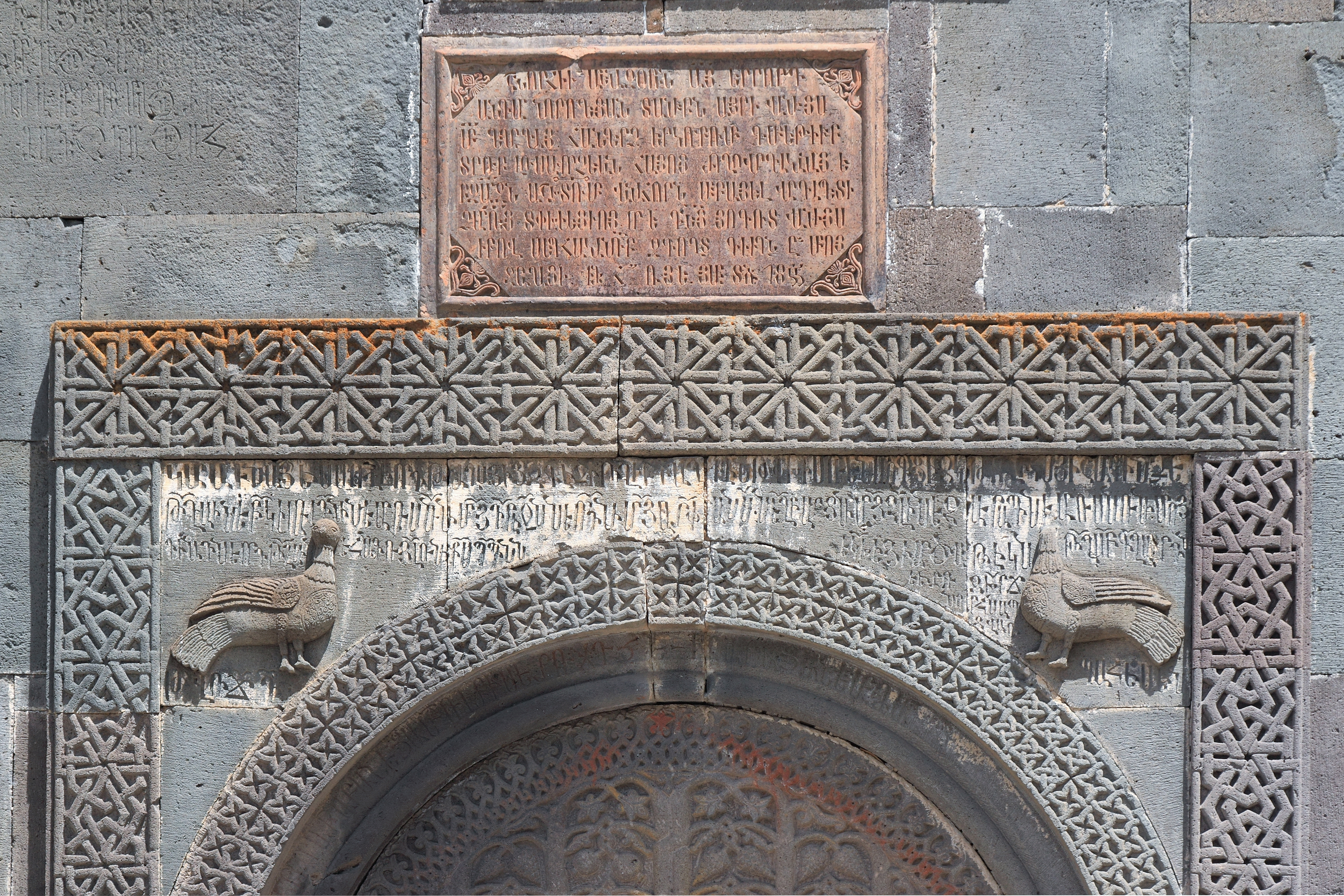
Inscription from Geghard Monastery

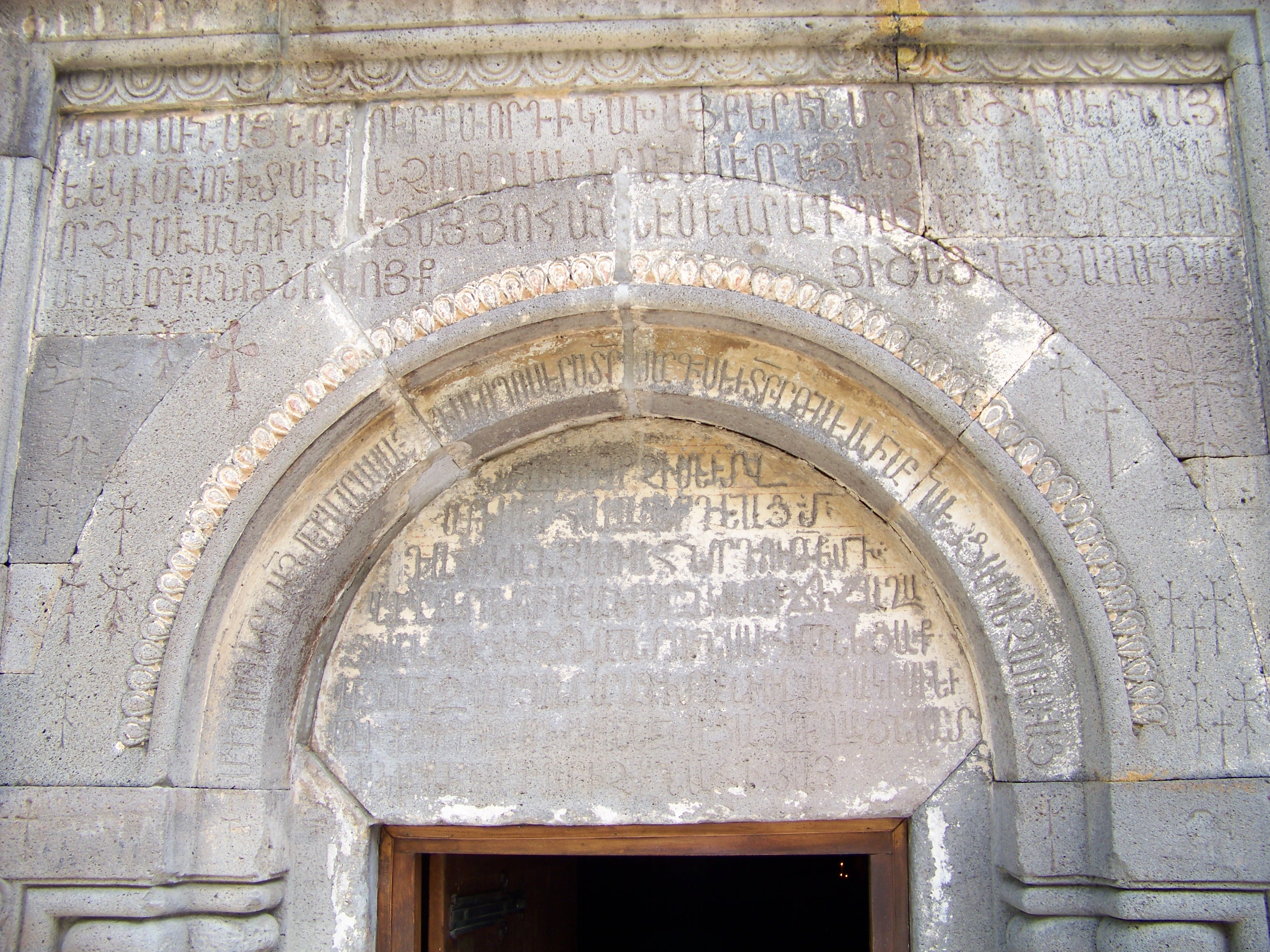
Inscription from Kecharis Monastery

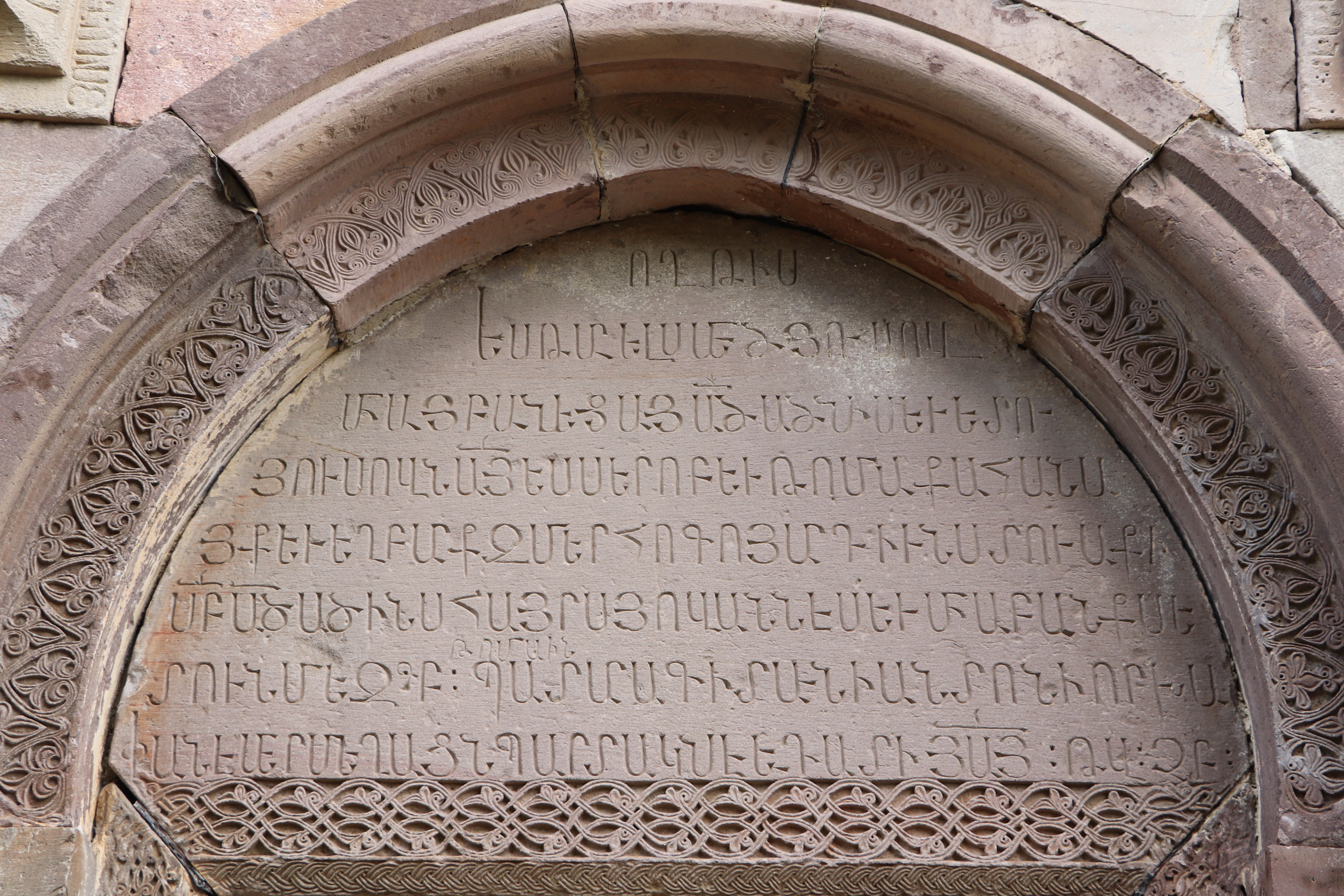
Inscription from Makaravank Monastery

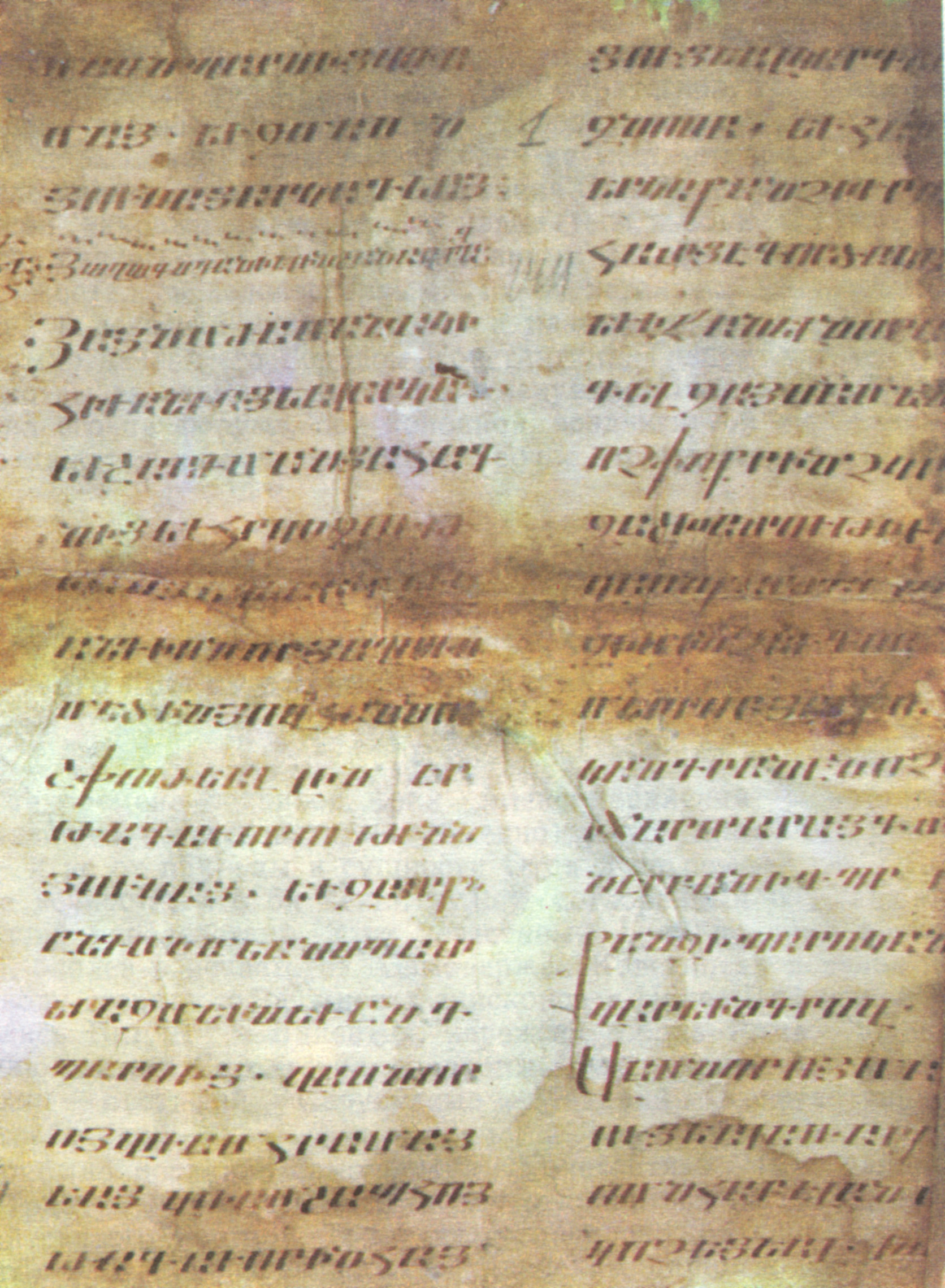
Armenian manuscript of the 10th or 11th century. History of Armenia of Movses Khorenatsi

=== Armenian scripts in various gospels and manuscripts ===
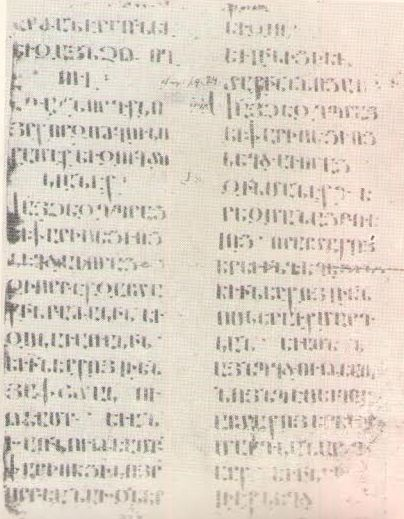
Page from 5th century Manuscript

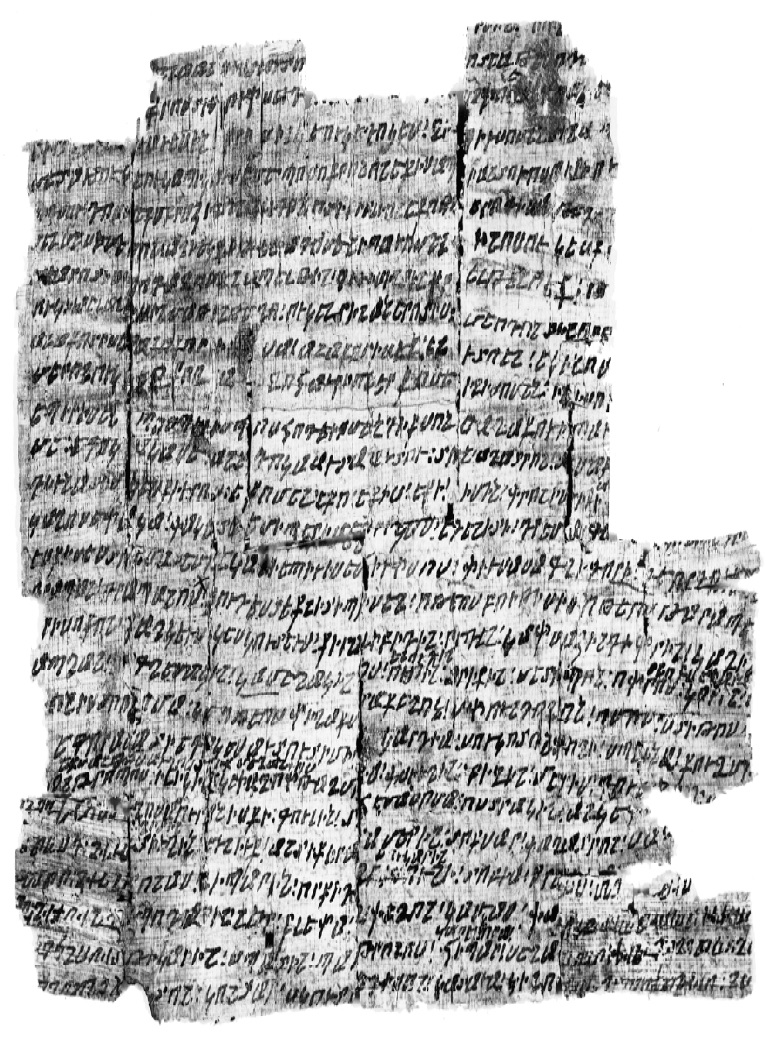
Armenian Greek inscription 5-7th centuryes

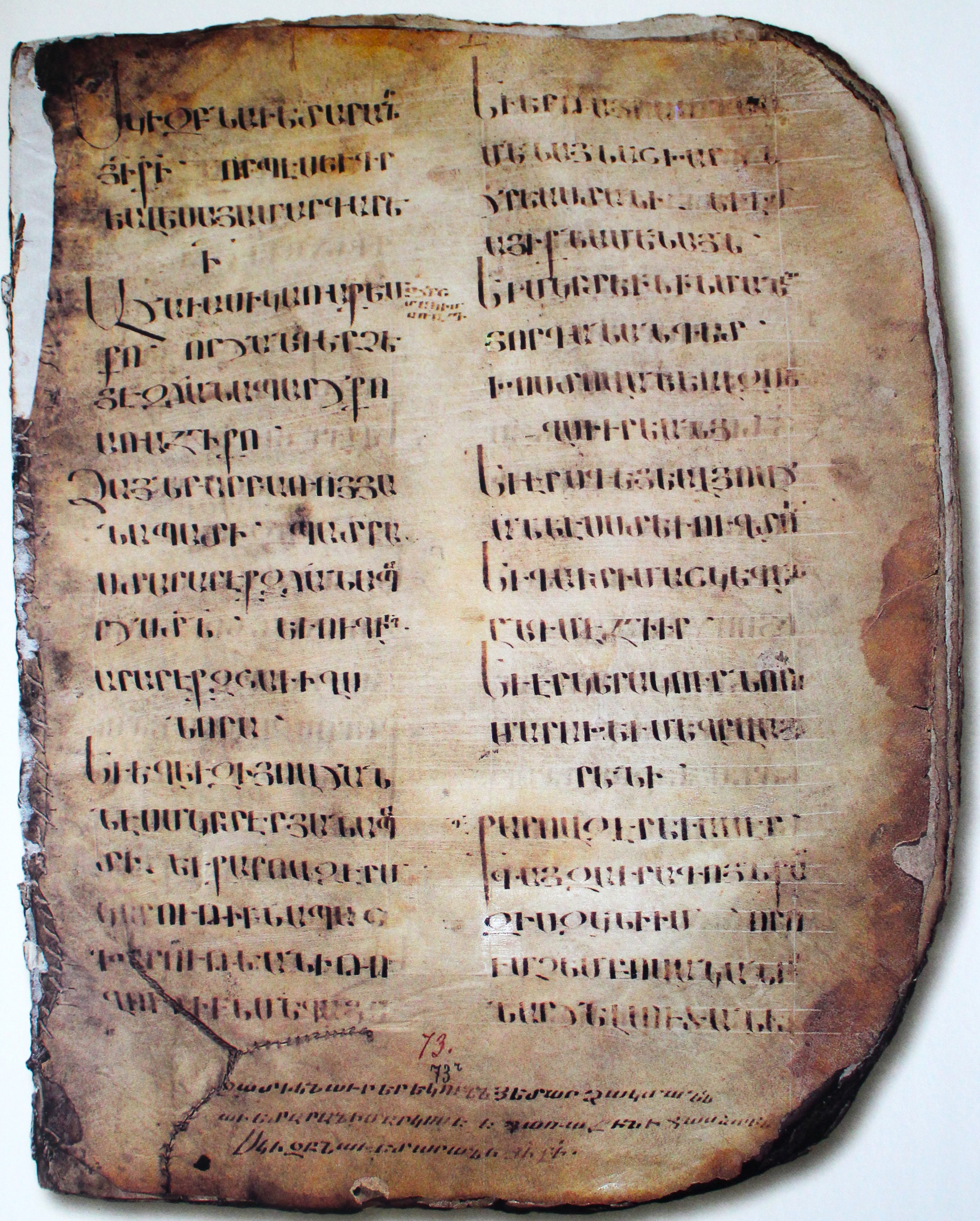
Armenian Manuscript, 887

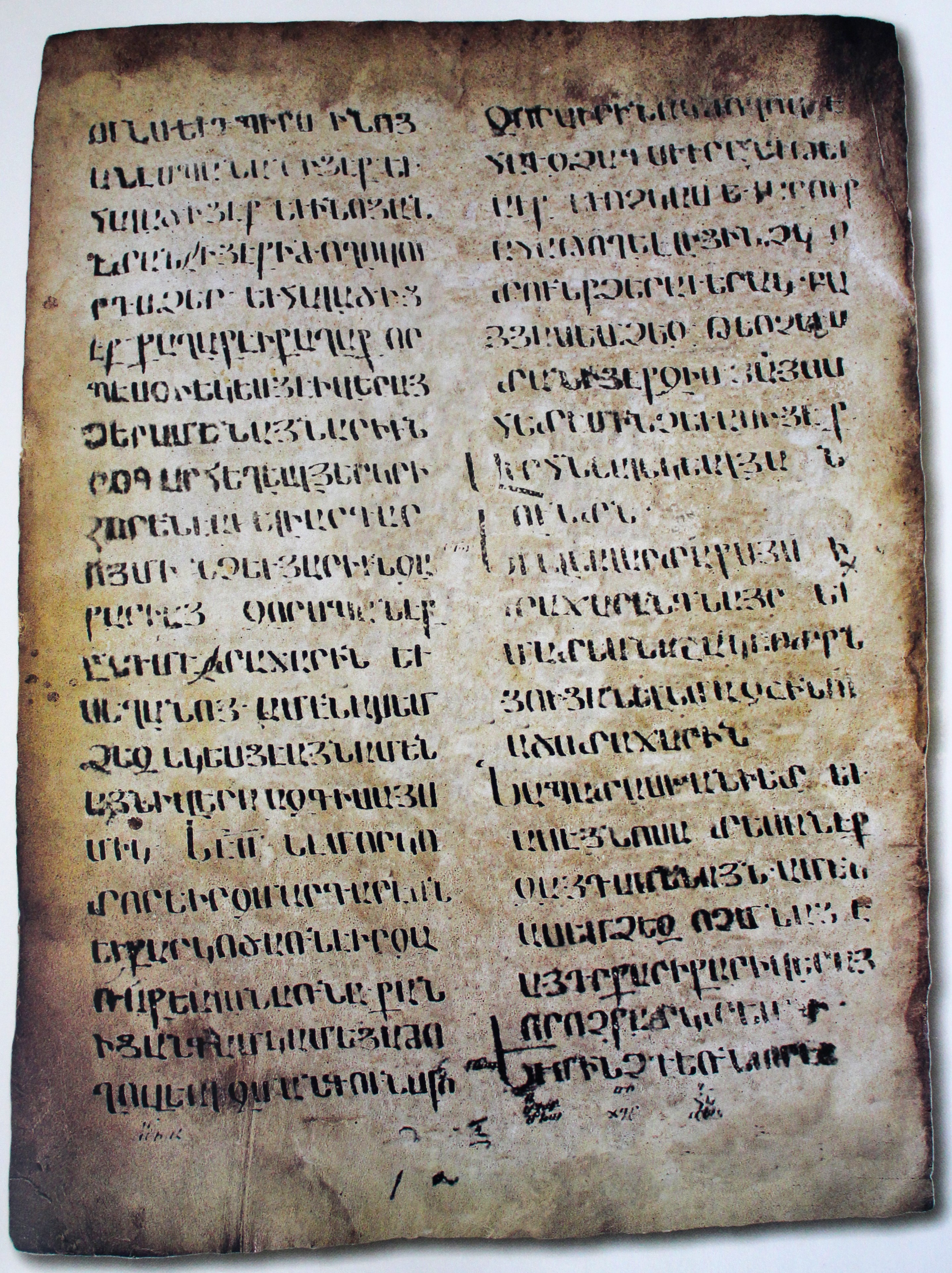
Armenian Manuscript, 974

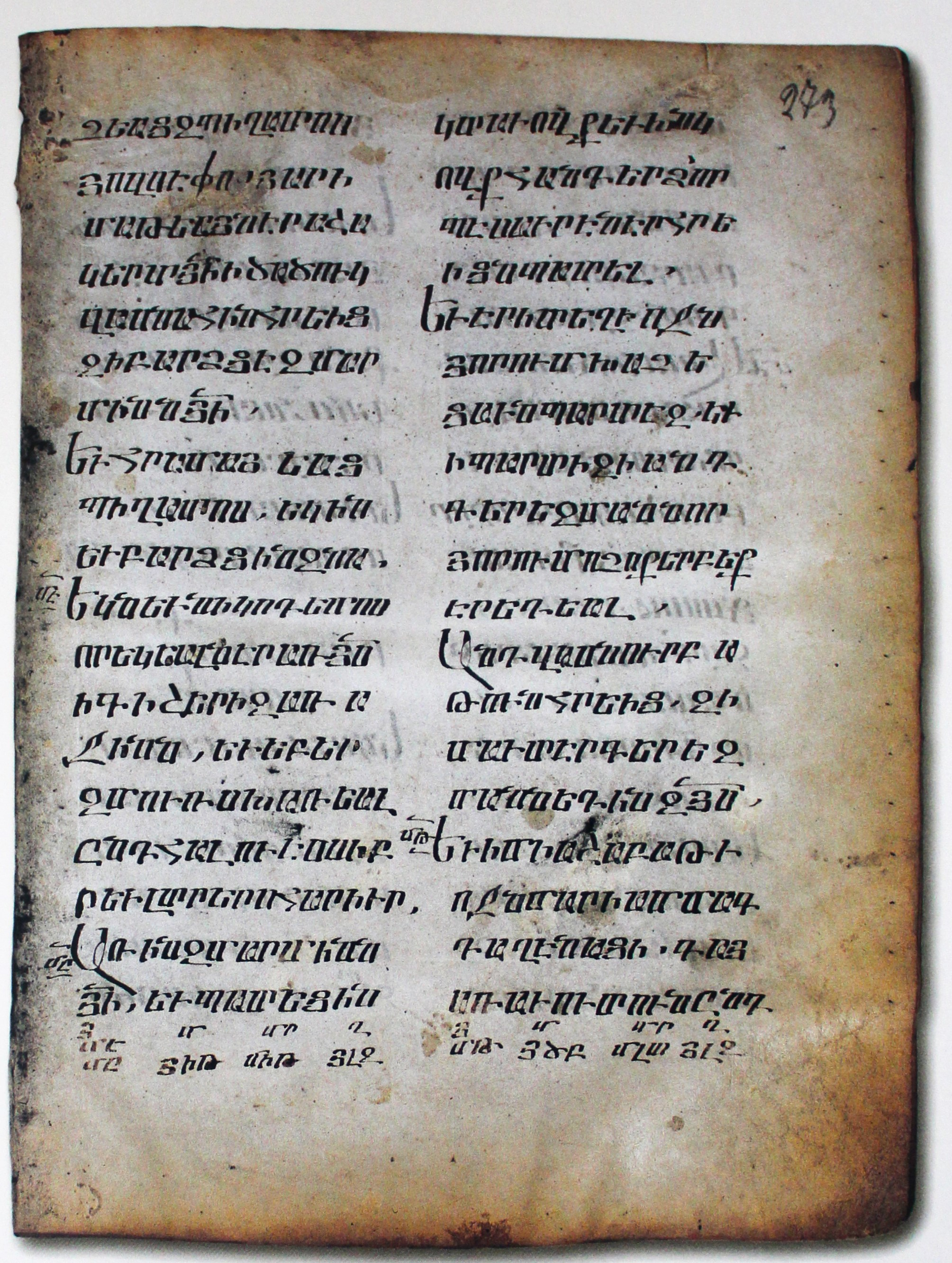
Armenian Manuscript, 1099

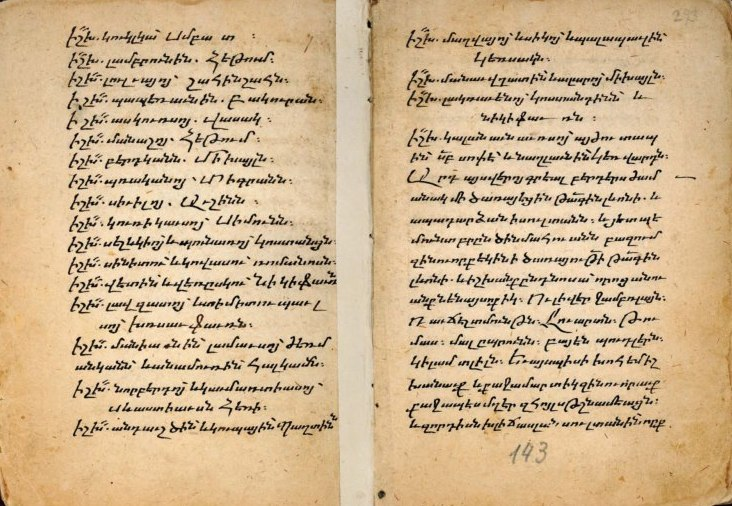
List of invitees to the enthronement of King Levon I, 1198

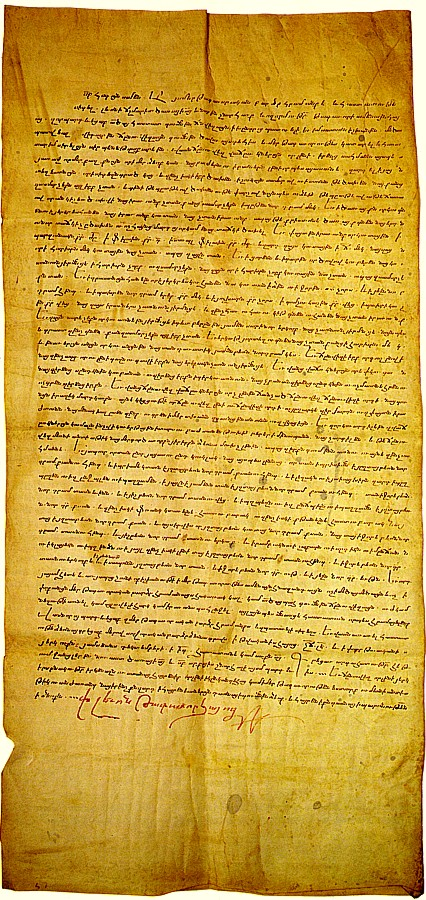
Document of Leo II of Armenia connoting the granting of special privileges and rights to Genoese merchant community, 1288

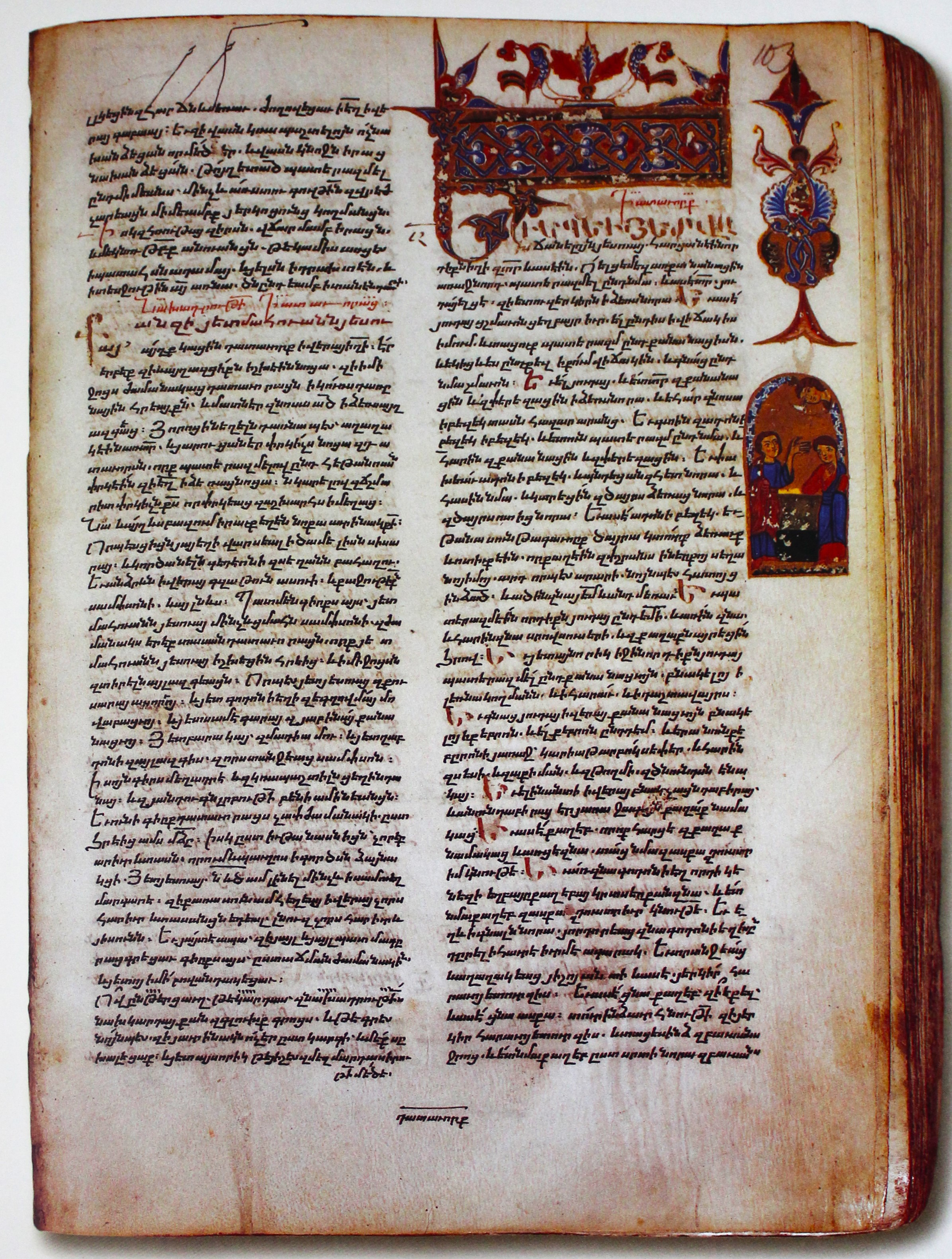
Armenian Manuscript, 1318

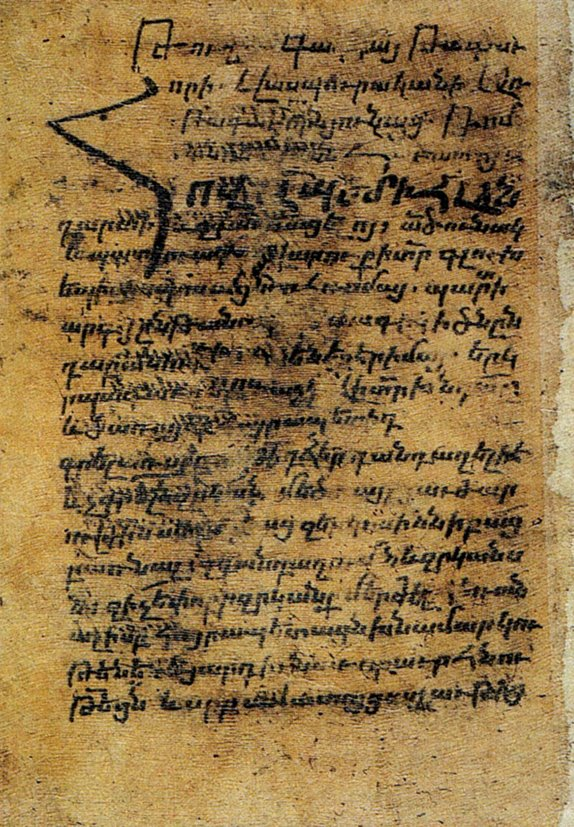
Page of a letter from King Gagik I of Vaspurakan to Romanos I Lekapenos, 14th-century manuscript (Vatican Apostolic Library)

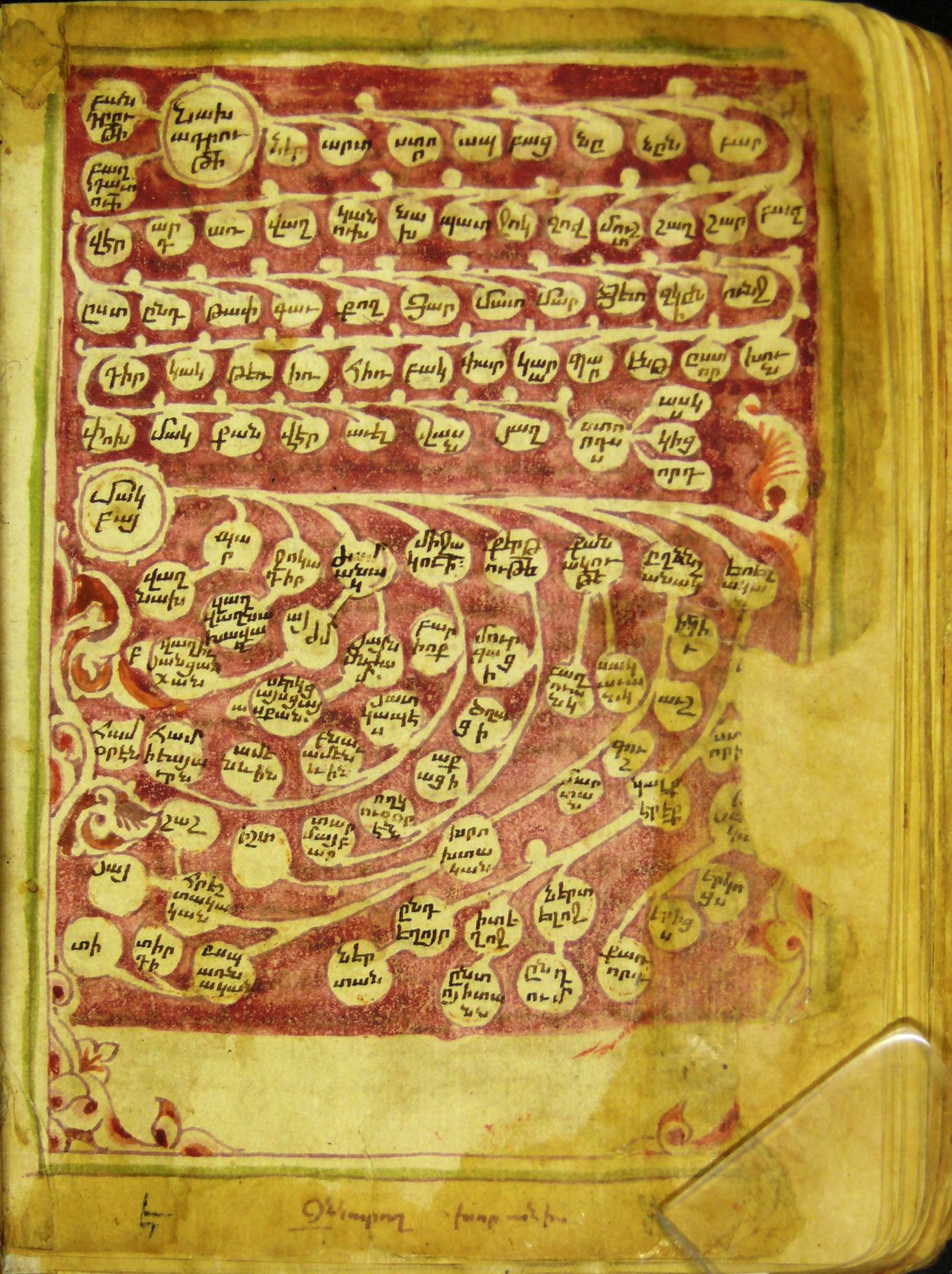
Armenian linguistic manuscript, 1476

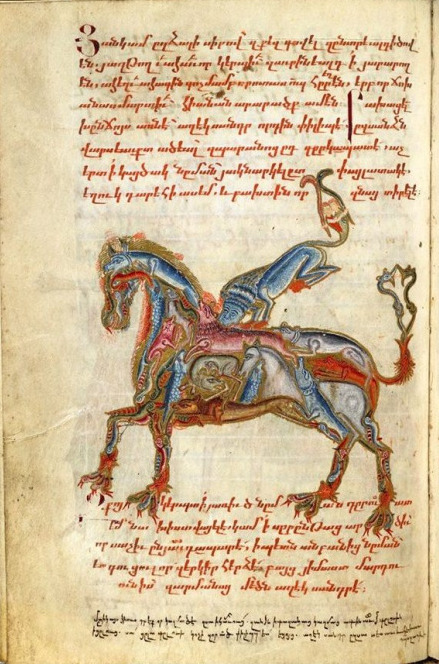
Manuscript page of the Alexander Romance, 1544

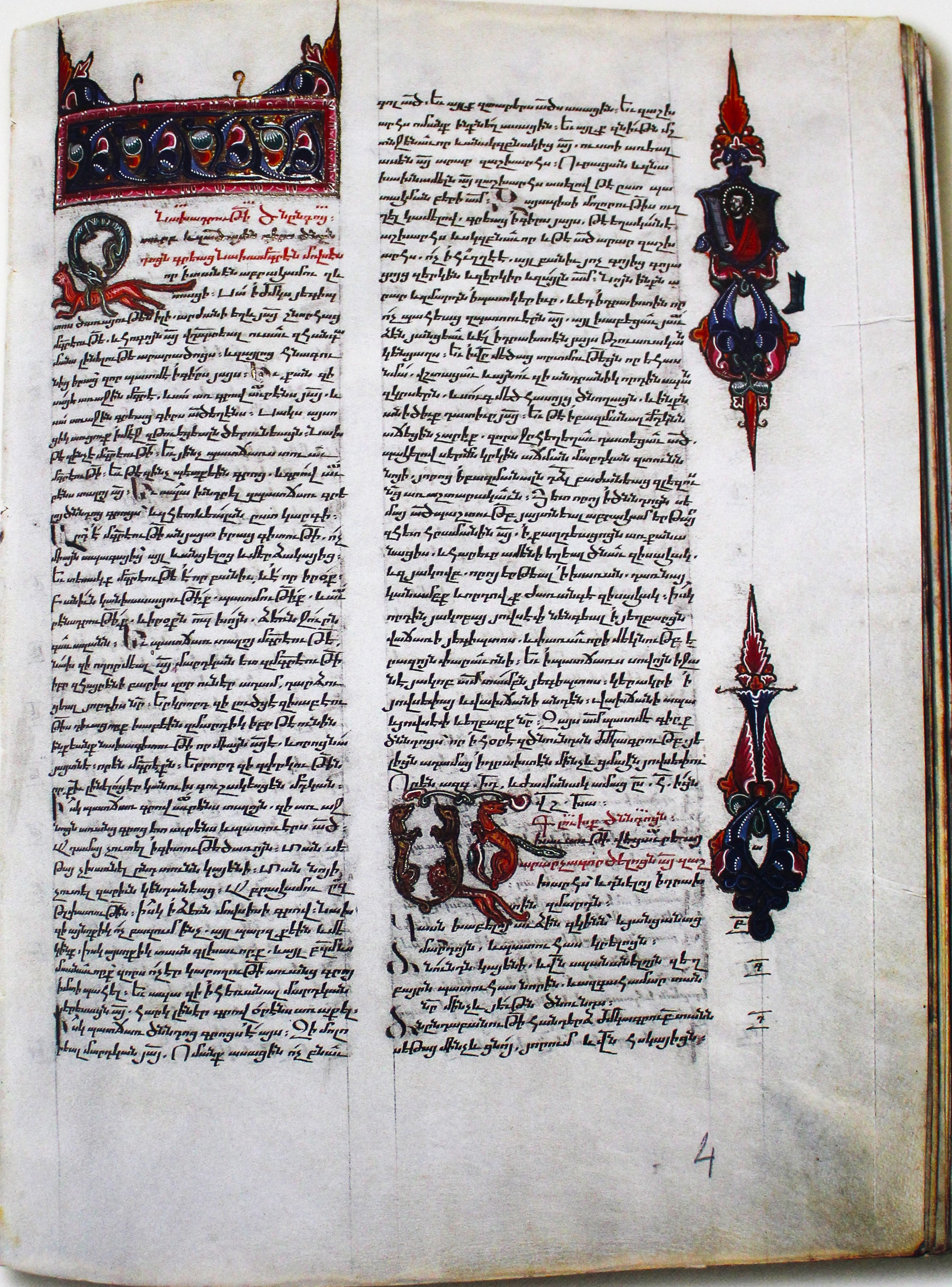
Armenian Manuscript, 1647

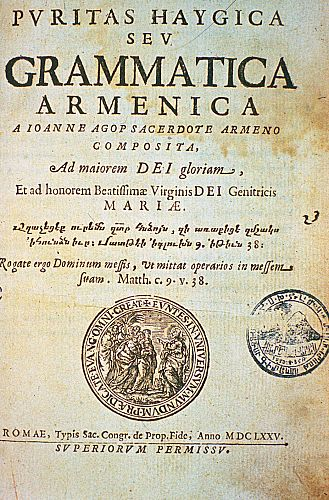
Armenian grammar, 1675

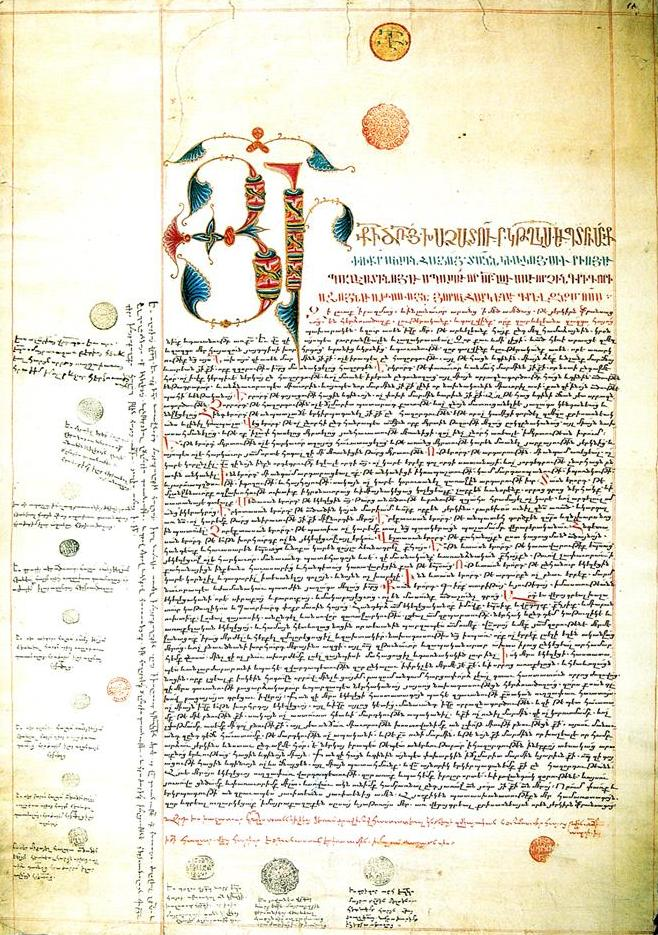
Letter from Catholicos Khachatur to Louis XIV, 1672 (Bibliothèque nationale de France)

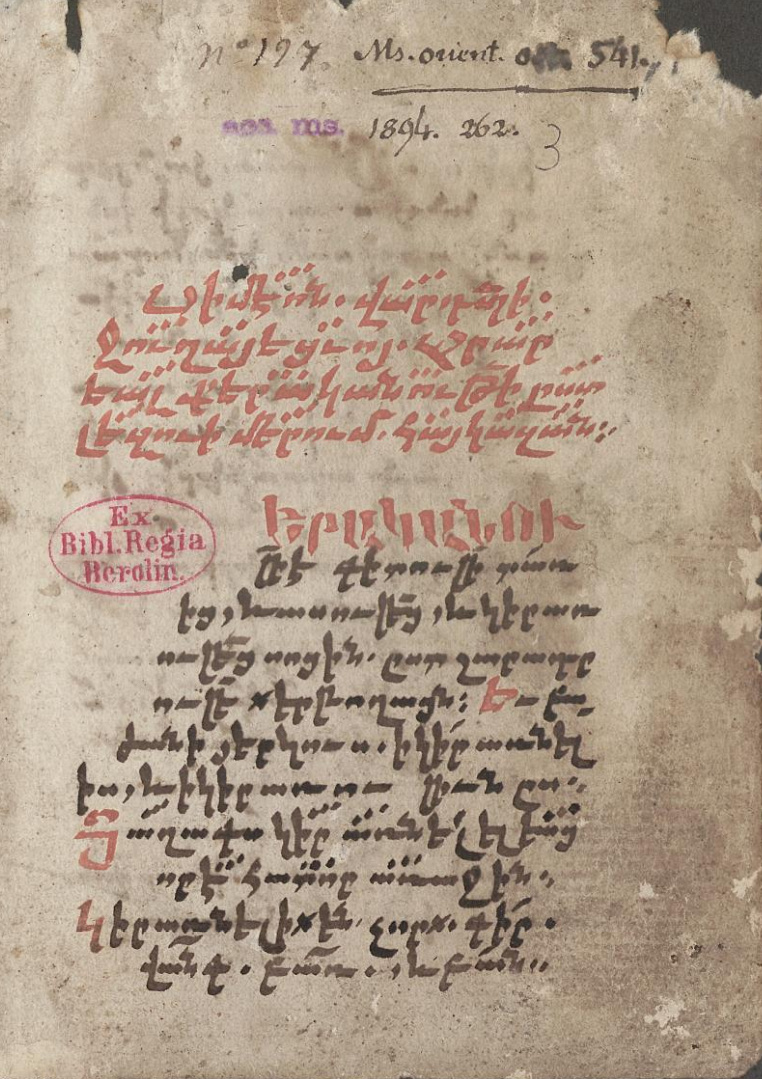
Page from Simeon Jughaetsi gospel, 18th century

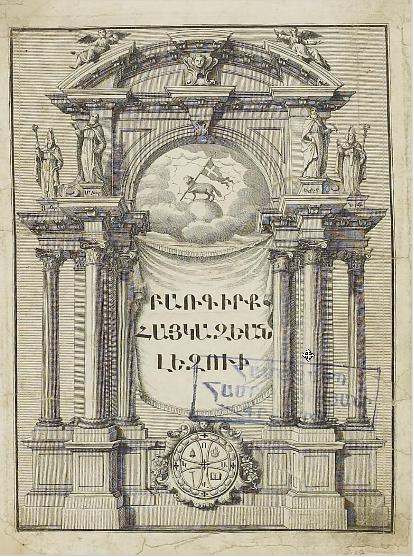
Cover of the book Dictionary of the Armenian Language by Mkhitar Sebastatsi, published in 1769, Venice

=== Other uses ===
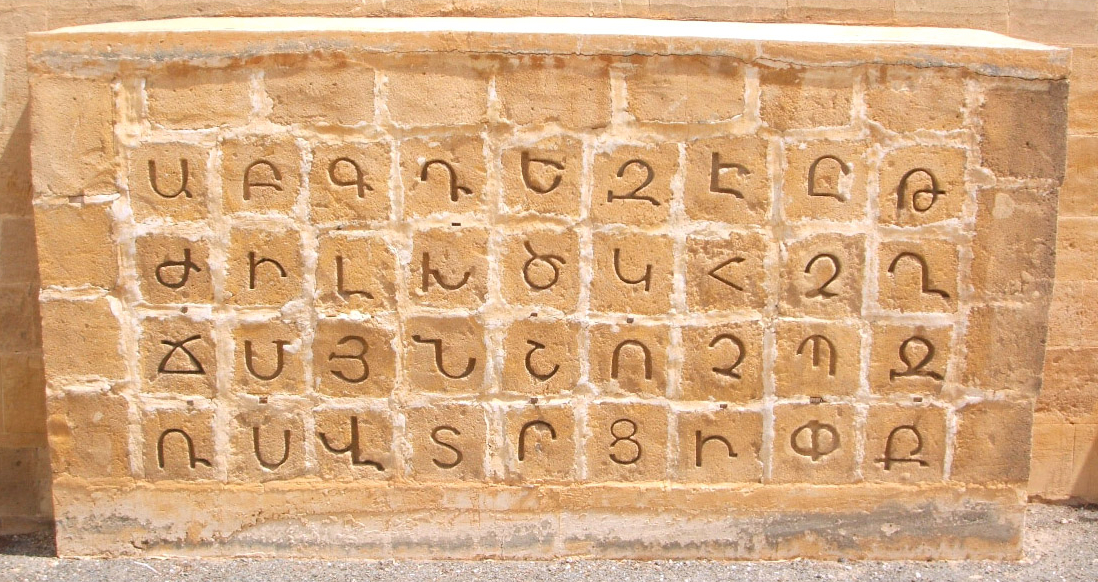
The monument to the Armenian alphabet at the Melkonian Educational Institute in Nicosia, Cyprus

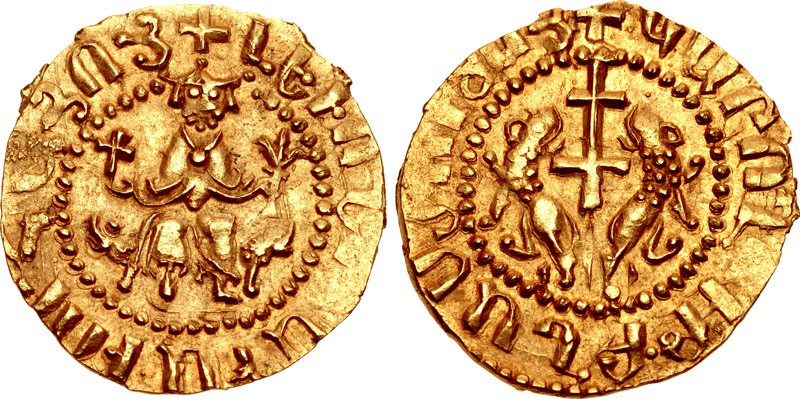
Gold Coin of King Leo I of Cilicia

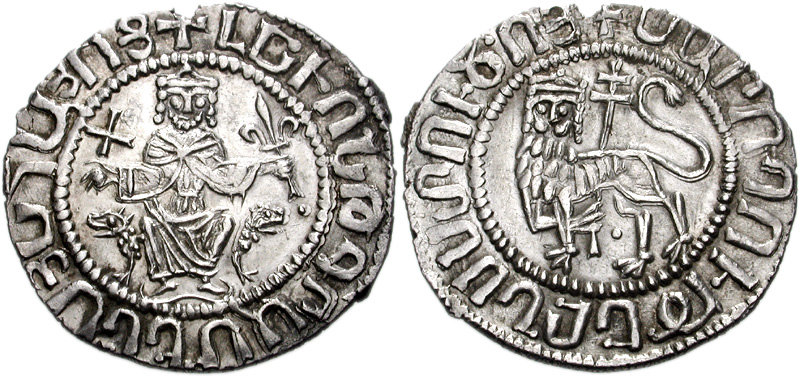
Silver Coin of King Leo I of Cilicia

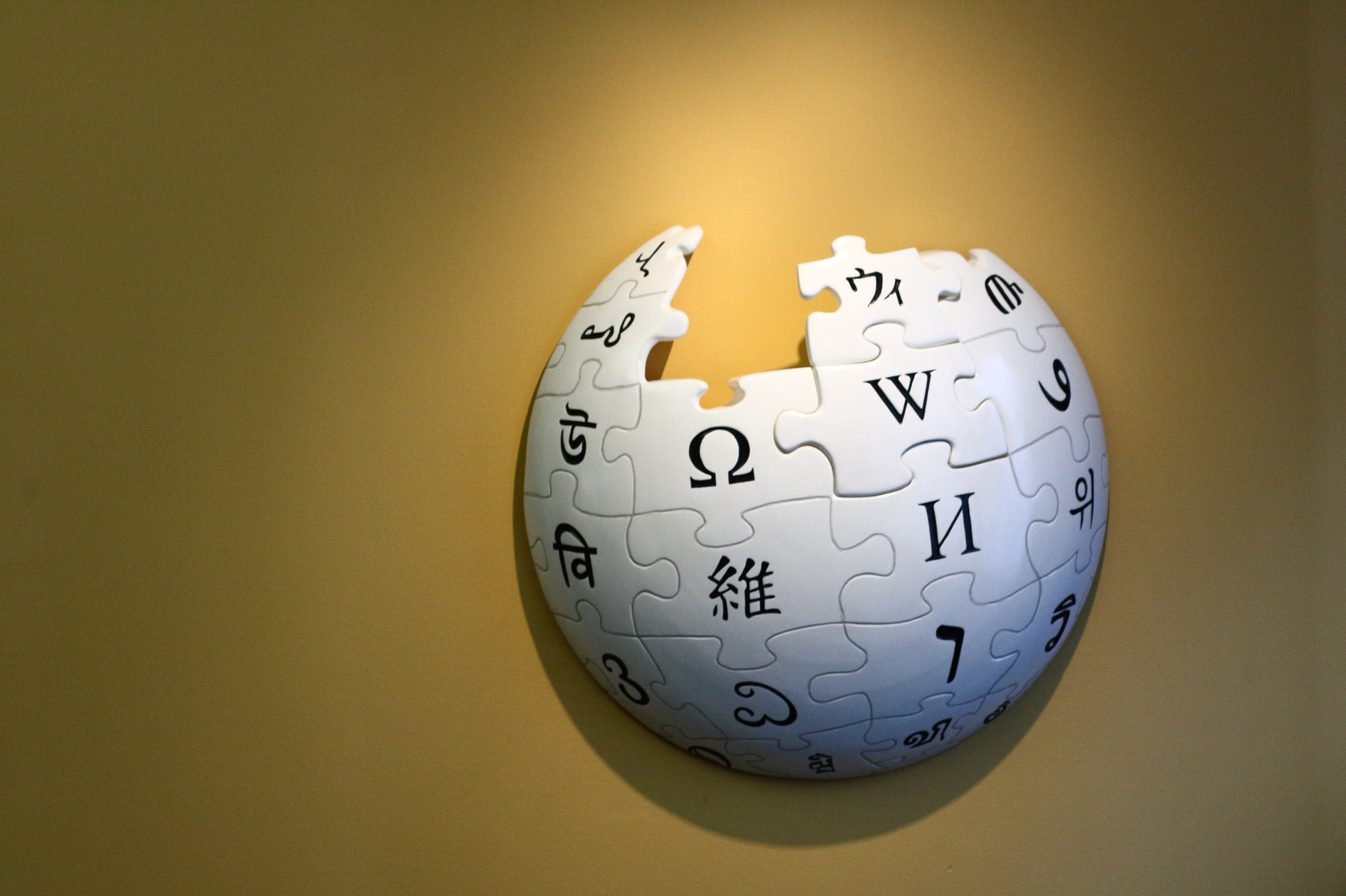
The Armenian letter ⟨Վ⟩ is on the Wikipedia logo (up left)

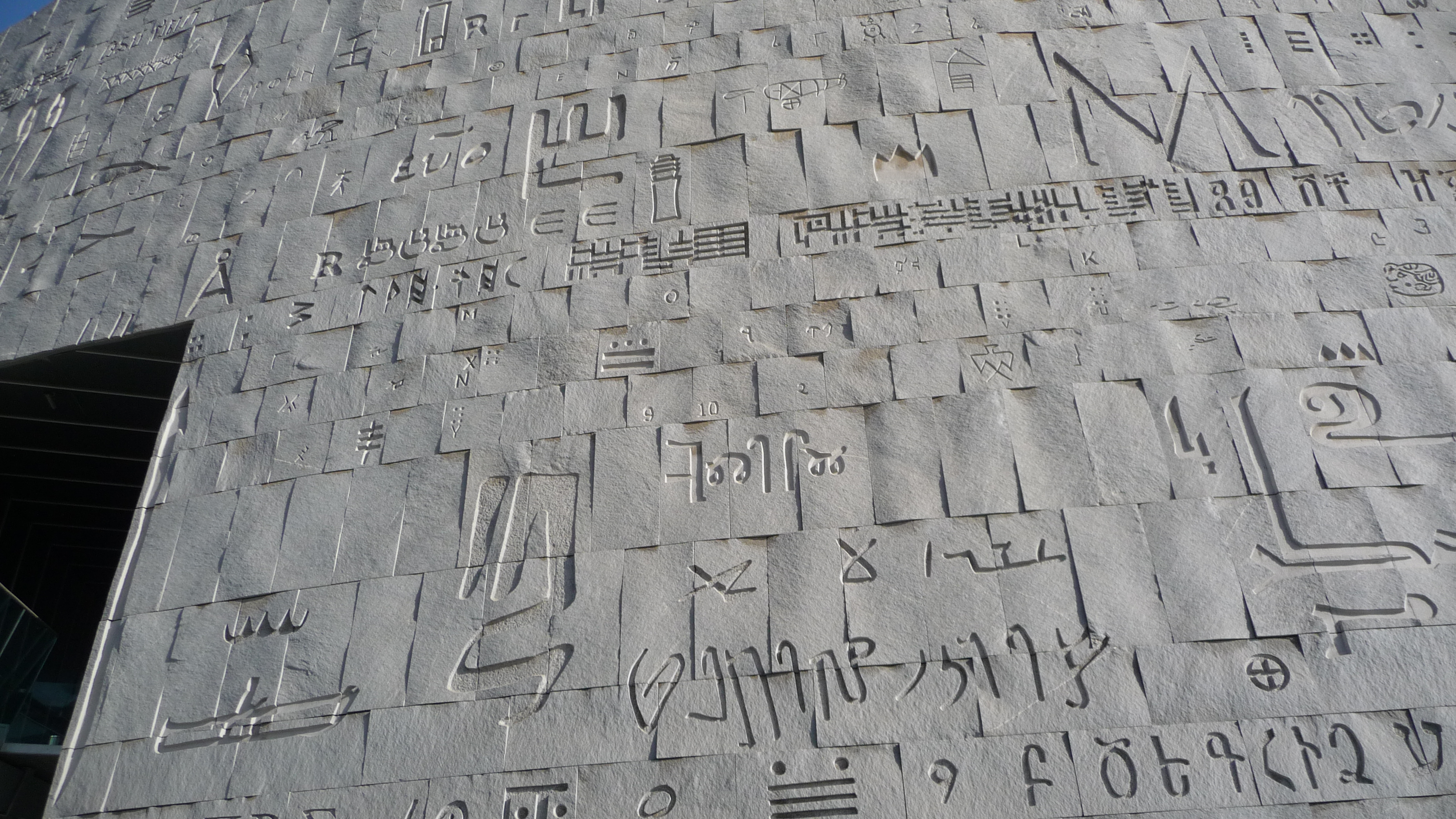
Armenian script in facade of Bibliotheca Alexandrina (right down) with Բ Ծ Ե Գ Հ Ի Ձ

== See also ==
- Armenian braille
- Armenian calendar
- Armenian numerals
- Classical Armenian orthography
- Reformed Armenian orthography
- Romanization of Armenian (includes ISO 9985)
