= Armenian (Unicode block) =

- Range: U+0530..U+058F (96 code points)
- Plane: BMP
- Scripts: Armenian
- Major alphabets: Armenian alphabet
- Assigned: 94 code points
- Unused: 2 reserved code points

Unicode Version History
- 1.0.0 (1991): 84 (+84)
- 1.1 (1993): 85 (+1)
- 3.0 (1999): 86 (+1)
- 6.1 (2012): 87 (+1)
- 7.0 (2014): 89 (+2)
- 11.0 (2018): 91 (+2)
- 18.0 (2026): 94 (+3)

Unicode documentation
- Code chart ∣ Web page

Armenian is a Unicode block containing characters for writing the Armenian language, both the classical and reformed orthographies. Five Armenian ligatures are encoded in the Alphabetic Presentation Forms block.

== Block ==
Armenian^{[1]}^{[2]} Official Unicode Consortium code chart (PDF)
	0	1	2	3	4	5	6	7	8	9	A	B	C	D	E	F
U+053x		Ա	Բ	Գ	Դ	Ե	Զ	Է	Ը	Թ	Ժ	Ի	Լ	Խ	Ծ	Կ
U+054x	Հ	Ձ	Ղ	Ճ	Մ	Յ	Ն	Շ	Ո	Չ	Պ	Ջ	Ռ	Ս	Վ	Տ
U+055x	Ր	Ց	Ւ	Փ	Ք	Օ	Ֆ		՘	ՙ	՚	՛	՜	՝	՞	՟
U+056x	ՠ	ա	բ	գ	դ	ե	զ	է	ը	թ	ժ	ի	լ	խ	ծ	կ
U+057x	հ	ձ	ղ	ճ	մ	յ	ն	շ	ո	չ	պ	ջ	ռ	ս	վ	տ
U+058x	ր	ց	ւ	փ	ք	օ	ֆ	և	ֈ	։	֊	֋	֌	֍	֎	֏
Notes 1.As of Unicode version 18.0 2.Grey areas indicate non-assigned code points

U+2019 ’ RIGHT SINGLE QUOTATION MARK is preferred over U+055A ՚ ARMENIAN APOSTROPHE. U+02BB ʻ MODIFIER LETTER TURNED COMMA is preferred over U+0559 ՙ ARMENIAN MODIFIER LETTER LEFT HALF RING.

== History ==
The following Unicode-related documents record the purpose and process of defining specific characters in the Armenian block:

Version	Final code points (Note: Proposed code points and characters names may differ from final code points and names)	Count	L2 ID	WG2 ID	Document
1.0.0	U+0531..0556, 0559..055F, 0561..0586, 0589	84			(to be determined)
1.0.0	U+0531..0556, 0559..055F, 0561..0586, 0589	84	L2/17-315		Golev, Yury; Anderson, Deborah (2017-09-07), Evidence of diaeresis in Armenian
1.0.0	U+0531..0556, 0559..055F, 0561..0586, 0589	84	L2/17-384		Anderson, Deborah; Whistler, Ken; Pournader, Roozbeh; Moore, Lisa; Liang, Hai (2017-10-22), "4. Armenian", Recommendations to UTC #153 October 2017 on Script Proposals
1.0.0	U+0531..0556, 0559..055F, 0561..0586, 0589	84	L2/17-362		Moore, Lisa (2018-02-02), "C.5. Evidence of diaeresis in Armenian", UTC #153 Minutes
1.1	U+0587	1			(to be determined)
3.0	U+058A	1		N1395	Youatt, Richard (1996-06-04), Armenian Repertoire Proposal Summary Form
3.0	U+058A	1		N1444	Everson, Michael (1996-08-07), Proposed amendments to N 1395 - Armenian
3.0	U+058A	1		N1446	U.S. Position on Armenian (N 1395), 1996-08-09
3.0	U+058A	1		N1453	Ksar, Mike; Umamaheswaran, V. S. (1996-12-06), "8.11", WG 2 Minutes - Quebec Meeting 31
3.0	U+058A	1		N1560	Youatt, Richard (1997-05-16), Response on US feedback on Armenian
3.0	U+058A	1	L2/97-161	N1616	Suignard, Michel (1997-07-03), Armenian ad hoc report
3.0	U+058A	1	L2/97-288	N1603	Umamaheswaran, V. S. (1997-10-24), "8.23", Unconfirmed Meeting Minutes, WG 2 Meeting # 33, Heraklion, Crete, Greece, 20 June – 4 July 1997
3.0	U+058A	1	L2/98-004R	N1681	Text of ISO 10646 – AMD 18 for PDAM registration and FPDAM ballot, 1997-12-22
3.0	U+058A	1	L2/98-318	N1894	Revised text of 10646-1/FPDAM 18, AMENDMENT 18: Symbols and Others, 1998-10-22
6.1	U+058F	1	L2/10-015R		Moore, Lisa (2010-02-09), "D.5", UTC #122 / L2 #219 Minutes
6.1	U+058F	1	L2/10-008R	N3771	Pentzlin, Karl (2010-02-10), Proposal to encode an Armenian Dram currency symbol
6.1	U+058F	1		N3824-SARM	SARM – Armenian NB Comments on SC 2 N 4125, ISO/IEC FCD 10646) [Proposal for Armenian symbols], 2010-04-19
6.1	U+058F	1	L2/10-136	N3827	Suignard, Michel (2010-04-21), "Proposal to add DRAM SIGN", Disposition of comments on SC2 N 4125 (ISO/IEC FCD 10646)
6.1	U+058F	1		N3803 (pdf, doc)	"M56.08g", Unconfirmed minutes of WG 2 meeting no. 56, 2010-09-24
7.0	U+058D..058E	2	L2/98-426	N1981	Armenian Comments on SC 2 N 3134, Application for Registration No.221, Armenian alphabet coded character set for bibliographic information interchange, 1998-12-16
7.0	U+058D..058E	2	L2/99-047	N1984	Suignard, Michel (1999-02-05), Encoding of the Armenian script in ISO/IEC 10646, answer to SC2 N3222
7.0	U+058D..058E	2	L2/99-054R		Aliprand, Joan (1999-06-21), "Armenian", Approved Minutes from the UTC/L2 meeting in Palo Alto, February 3-5, 1999
7.0	U+058D..058E	2	L2/99-232	N2003	Umamaheswaran, V. S. (1999-08-03), "7.2.1.5", Minutes of WG 2 meeting 36, Fukuoka, Japan, 1999-03-09--15
7.0	U+058D..058E	2	L2/10-133	N3824	Summary of Voting on SC 2 N 4125, ISO/IEC FCD 10646, 2010-04-19
7.0	U+058D..058E	2		N3824-SARM	SARM – Armenian NB Comments on SC 2 N 4125, ISO/IEC FCD 10646) [Proposal for Armenian symbols], 2010-04-19
7.0	U+058D..058E	2	L2/10-136	N3827	Suignard, Michel (2010-04-21), "Proposal to add ETERNITY SIGN", Disposition of comments on SC2 N 4125 (ISO/IEC FCD 10646)
7.0	U+058D..058E	2	L2/10-354	N3924	Everson, Michael (2010-09-24), Proposal to encode two symbols for Armenian
7.0	U+058D..058E	2	L2/10-372	N3921	Summary of Voting on SC 2 N 4146, ISO/IEC CD 10646 (3rd Ed.), 2010-09-24
7.0	U+058D..058E	2	L2/10-373	N3923	Pentzlin, Karl (2010-09-24), Proposal to add an Armenian Eternity Sign to the UCS
7.0	U+058D..058E	2		N3903 (pdf, doc)	"M57.13", Unconfirmed minutes of WG2 meeting 57, 2011-03-31
7.0	U+058D..058E	2	L2/11-261R2		Moore, Lisa (2011-08-16), "Consensus 128-C29", UTC #128 / L2 #225 Minutes, "Approve revised code points for the two Armenian eternity signs..."
7.0	U+058D..058E	2		N4103	"T.3. Miscellaneous Pictographic Symbols", Unconfirmed minutes of WG 2 meeting 58, 2012-01-03
11.0	U+0560, 0588	2	L2/17-032	N4806	Baronian, Luc V. (2017-01-19), Armenian Phonetic Characters in Unicode
11.0	U+0560, 0588	2	L2/17-037		Anderson, Deborah; Whistler, Ken; Pournader, Roozbeh; Glass, Andrew; Iancu, Laurențiu; Moore, Lisa; Liang, Hai; Ishida, Richard; Misra, Karan; McGowan, Rick (2017-01-21), "1. Armenian", Recommendations to UTC #150 January 2017 on Script Proposals
11.0	U+0560, 0588	2	L2/17-016		Moore, Lisa (2017-02-08), "C.13", UTC #150 Minutes
11.0	U+0560, 0588	2		N4953 (pdf, doc)	"M66.03a", Unconfirmed minutes of WG 2 meeting 66, 2018-03-23, "058B ARMENIAN SMALL LETTER TURNED AYB is moved to 0560, and 058C ARMENIAN SMALL LETTER YI WITH STROKE is moved to 0588."
11.0	U+0560, 0588	2	L2/17-353		Anderson, Deborah; Whistler, Ken (2017-10-02), "A. Armenian", WG2 Consent Docket
11.0	U+0560, 0588	2	L2/17-362		Moore, Lisa (2018-02-02), "Consensus 153-C1", UTC #153 Minutes
18.0	U+0558, 058B..058C	3	L2/24-107		Dolatian, Hossep (2024-04-16), Revised: Proposal to encode three Armenian superscript characters
18.0	U+0558, 058B..058C	3	L2/24-068		Anderson, Deborah; Goregaokar, Manish; Kučera, Jan; Whistler, Ken; Pournader, Roozbeh; Constable, Peter (2024-04-18), "2. Armenian", Recommendations to UTC #179 April 2024 on Script Proposals
18.0	U+0558, 058B..058C	3	L2/24-061		Constable, Peter (2024-04-29), "Consensus 179-C46", UTC #179 Minutes, "Provisionally assign 3 Armenian superscript code points ..."
18.0	U+0558, 058B..058C	3	L2/25-226		"Consensus 185-C40", UTC #185 Minutes, 2025-10-29, "UTC accepts for encoding in Unicode 18.0 ..."
