= Za (Armenian) =

Letter in the Armenian alphabet

- Զ զ

Usage
- Writing system: Armenian script
- Type: Alphabetic
- Language of origin: Armenian language
- Sound values: z
- In Unicode: U+536, U+566
- Alphabetical position: 6

History
- Time period: 405 to present

Other
- Associated numbers: 6

Za (majuscule: Զ; minuscule: զ; Armenian: զա) is the sixth letter of the Armenian alphabet. It represents the voiced alveolar sibilant /z/ in both Eastern and Western varieties of Armenian. Created by Mesrop Mashtots in the 5th century, it has a numerical value of ⟨6⟩. Its shape in capital form is similar to the Arabic numeral 2 and two other Armenian letters, Dza ⟨Ձ⟩ and Je ⟨Ջ⟩. Its shape in lowercase form is also similar to the minuscule form of the Latin Q ⟨q⟩, the minuscule form of the Cyrillic letter Ԛ ⟨ԛ⟩, and the minuscule form of another Armenian letter, Gim ⟨գ⟩.

== Computing codes ==
Character information
Preview	Զ		զ	
Unicode name	ARMENIAN CAPITAL LETTER ZA		ARMENIAN SMALL LETTER ZA	
Encodings	decimal	hex	dec	hex
Unicode	1334	U+0536	1382	U+0566
UTF-8	212 182	D4 B6	213 166	D5 A6
Numeric character reference	&#1334;	&#x536;	&#1382;	&#x566;

== Gallery ==
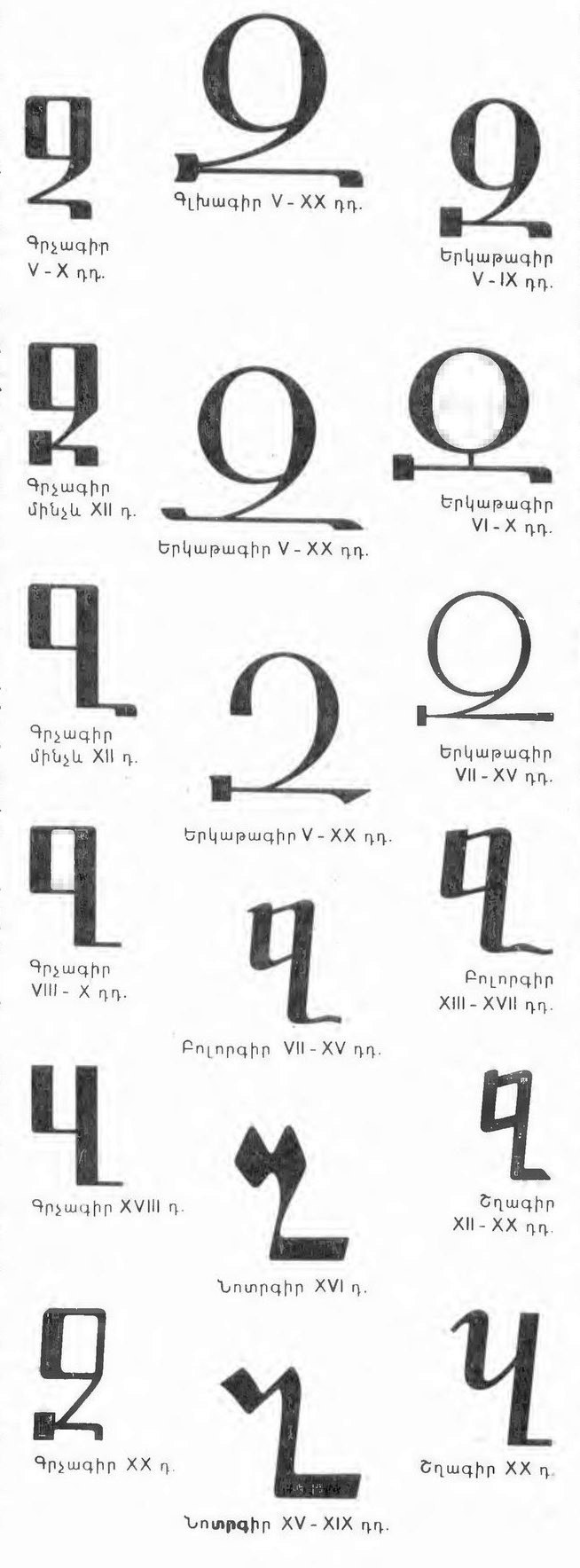
Various historical forms

Rounded Erkat'agir

Angular Erkat'agir

Bolorgir

Notrgir

Shghagir

Typographic form

Handwritten form
