= Ken (letter) =

Letter in the Armenian alphabet

- Կ կ

Usage
- Writing system: Armenian script
- Type: Alphabetic
- Language of origin: Armenian language
- Sound values: k (Eastern Armenian) ɡ (Western Armenian)
- In Unicode: U+053F, U+056F
- Alphabetical position: 15

History
- Time period: 405 to present

Other
- Associated numbers: 60
- Writing direction: Left-to-Right

Ken or Gen (majuscule: Կ; minuscule: կ; Armenian: կեն) is the fifteenth letter of the Armenian alphabet, representing the voiceless velar plosive (/k/) in Eastern Armenian and the voiced velar plosive (/ɡ/) in Western Armenian. It is typically romanized with the letter K. It was part of the alphabet created by Mesrop Mashtots in the 5th century CE. In the Armenian numeral system, it has a value of 60.

== Gallery ==
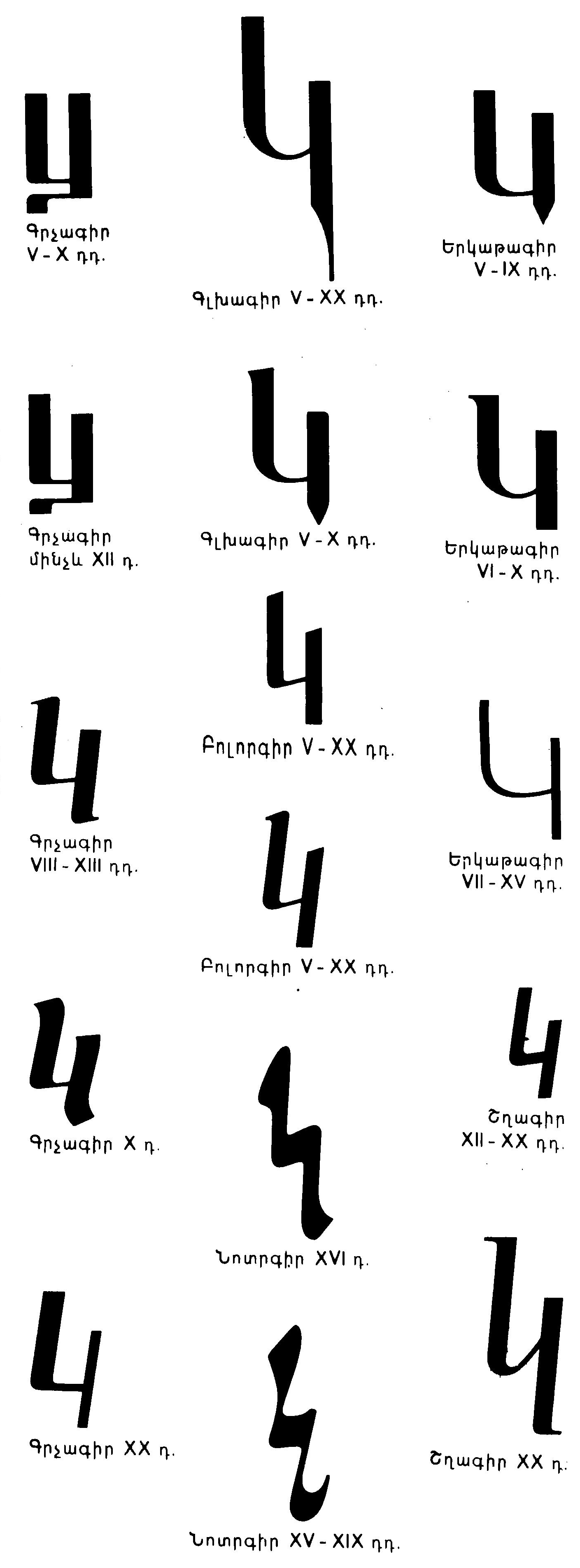
Various historic fonts

Rounded Erkat'agir

Angular Erkat'agir

Bolorgir

Notrgir

Shghagir

Typographic form

Handwritten form

== Character codes ==
Character information
Preview	Կ		կ	
Unicode name	ARMENIAN CAPITAL LETTER KEN		ARMENIAN SMALL LETTER KEN	
Encodings	decimal	hex	dec	hex
Unicode	1343	U+053F	1391	U+056F
UTF-8	212 191	D4 BF	213 175	D5 AF
Numeric character reference	&#1343;	&#x53F;	&#1391;	&#x56F;

== See also ==
- Tsa, the letter preceding Ken in the Armenian alphabet
- Armenian alphabet
