= Vev =

Letter in the Armenian alphabet

- Վ վ

Usage
- Writing system: Armenian script
- Type: Alphabetic
- Language of origin: Armenian language
- Sound values: [v]
- In Unicode: U+054E, U+057E
- Alphabetical position: 30

History
- Time period: 405 to present

Other
- Associated numbers: 3000
- Writing direction: Left-to-Right

Vev or Vew (majuscule: Վ; minuscule: վ; Armenian: վեվ; Classical Armenian: վեւ) is the 30th letter of the Armenian alphabet. It represents the voiced labiodental fricative (/v/), similar to the English v sound as in village. It is typically romanized with the letter V. It was part of the alphabet created by Mesrop Mashtots in the 5th century CE.

In the Armenian numeral system, it has a value of 3000.

== Use in Wikipedia logo ==
The logo of Wikipedia features the uppercase letter Vev, alongside several other characters from different alphabets. The letter is visible near the upper left corner of the globe on the Wikipedia logo.

== Gallery ==
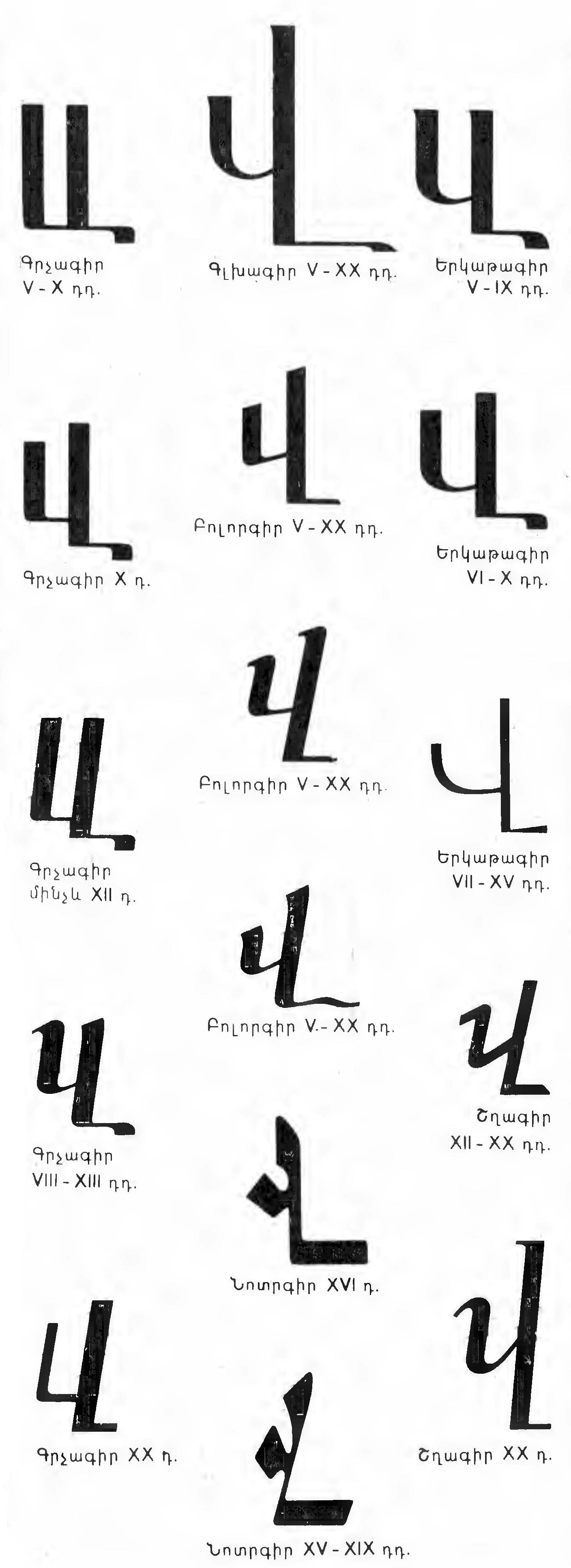
Various historic fonts

Rounded Erkat'agir

Angular Erkat'agir

Bolorgir

Notrgir

Shghagir

Typographic form

Handwritten form

== Character codes ==
Character information
| Preview | Վ | | վ | |
|---|---|---|---|---|
| Unicode name | ARMENIAN CAPITAL LETTER VEW | | ARMENIAN SMALL LETTER VEW | |
| Encodings | decimal | hex | dec | hex |
| Unicode | 1358 | U+054E | 1406 | U+057E |
| UTF-8 | 213 142 | D5 8E | 213 190 | D5 BE |
| Numeric character reference | &#1358; | &#x54E; | &#1406; | &#x57E; |

== See also ==
- Armenian alphabet
- Se, the letter preceding Vev in the Armenian alphabet
- Tyun, the letter following Vev in the Armenian alphabet
