= VEV (disambiguation) =

VEV is an abbreviation for vacuum expectation value.

VEV or Vev may also refer to:

- Vlaams Economisch Verbond
- Vev (Վ վ), an Armenian letter
