= P'yur =

Letter in the Armenian alphabet

Pyur
- Փ փ

Usage
- Writing system: Armenian script
- Type: Alphabetic
- Language of origin: Armenian language
- Sound values: pʰ
- In Unicode: U+0553, U+0583
- Alphabetical position: 35

History
- Development: 𓃻?: 𐤒; Ϙ ϙ; Φ φ; Փ փ
- Time period: 405 to present

Other
- Associated numbers: 8000

P'yur, Pyowr, Piwr, or P'ywr (uppercase: Փ, lowercase: փ; Reformed orthography: փյուր; Classical orthography: փիւր) is the 35th letter of the Armenian alphabet. It represents the aspirated voiceless bilabial stop (/pʰ/). Its capital form is homoglyphic to the Cyrillic letter Ef, the Greek letter Phi, and the IPA symbol for the voiceless bilabial fricative. The lowercase form is the letter Tyun with two additional vertical lines jutting on the top and the bottom. Created by Mesrop Mashtots in the 5th century, it has a value of 8000 as an Armenian numeral.

== Computing codes ==
Character information
Preview	Փ		փ	
Unicode name	ARMENIAN CAPITAL LETTER PIWR		ARMENIAN SMALL LETTER PIWR	
Encodings	decimal	hex	dec	hex
Unicode	1363	U+0553	1411	U+0583
UTF-8	213 147	D5 93	214 131	D6 83
Numeric character reference	&#1363;	&#x553;	&#1411;	&#x583;

== Gallery ==
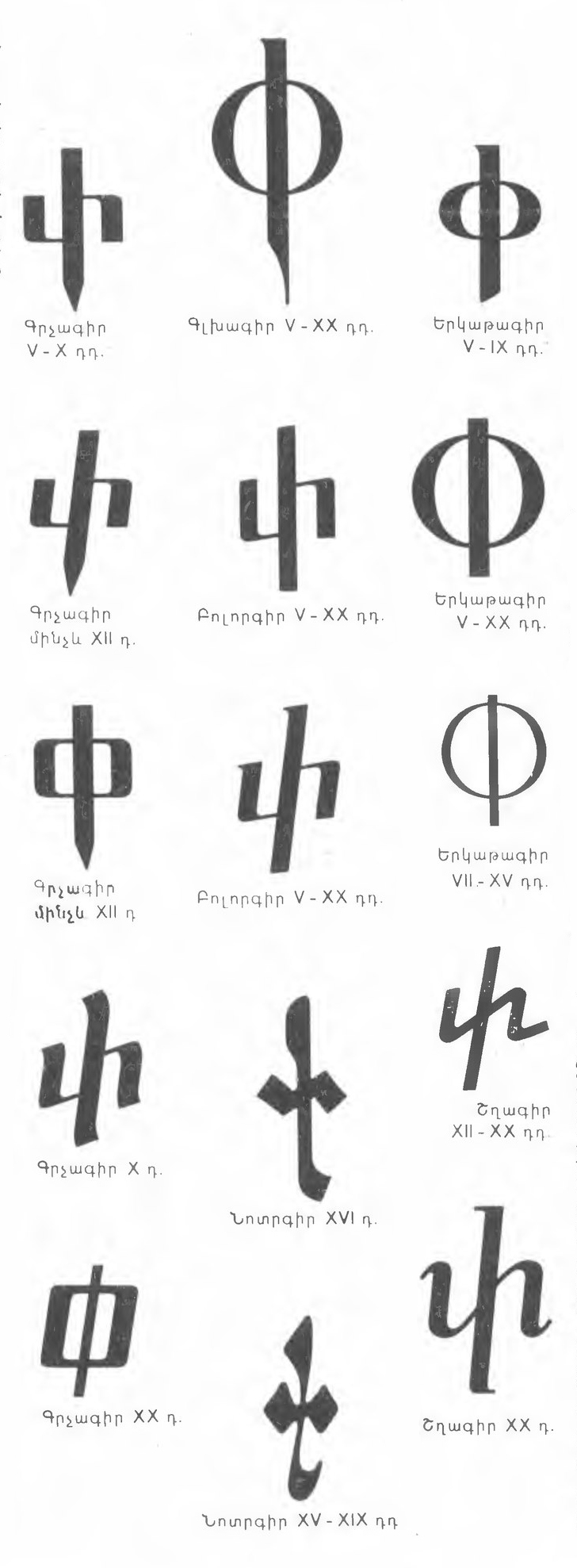
Various historic fonts

Rounded Erkat'agir

Angular Erkat'agir

Bolorgir

Notrgir

Shghagir

Typographic form

Handwritten form
