= Ho (Armenian) =

Letter in the Armenian alphabet

- Հ հ

Usage
- Writing system: Armenian script
- Type: Alphabetic
- Language of origin: Armenian language
- Sound values: [h]
- In Unicode: U+0540, U+0570
- Alphabetical position: 16

History
- Time period: 405 to present

Other
- Associated numbers: 70
- Writing direction: Left-to-Right

Ho (majuscule: Հ; minuscule: հ; Reformed orthography: հո; Classical orthography: հօ) is the sixteenth letter of the Armenian alphabet, representing the voiceless glottal fricative (/h/). It is typically romanized with the letter H. It was part of the alphabet created by Mesrop Mashtots in the 5th century CE. In the Armenian numeral system, it has a value of 70.

== Gallery ==
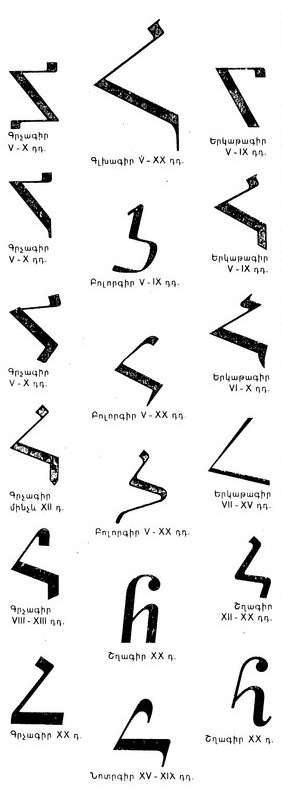
Various historic fonts

Rounded Erkat'agir

Angular Erkat'agir

Bolorgir

Notrgir

Shghagir

Typographic form

Handwritten form

== Character codes ==
Character information
Preview	Հ		հ	
Unicode name	ARMENIAN CAPITAL LETTER HO		ARMENIAN SMALL LETTER HO	
Encodings	decimal	hex	dec	hex
Unicode	1344	U+0540	1392	U+0570
UTF-8	213 128	D5 80	213 176	D5 B0
Numeric character reference	&#1344;	&#x540;	&#1392;	&#x570;

== See also ==
- Armenian alphabet
- Mesrop Mashtots
