= Zhe (Armenian) =

Letter in the Armenian alphabet

- Ժ ժ

Usage
- Writing system: Armenian script
- Type: Alphabetic
- Language of origin: Armenian language
- Sound values: ʒ
- In Unicode: U+053A, U+056A
- Alphabetical position: 10

History
- Time period: 405 to present

Other
- Associated numbers: 10
- Writing direction: Left-to-Right

Zhe, or Že (majuscule: Ժ; minuscule: ժ; Reformed orthography: ժե; Classical orthography: ժէ) is the tenth letter of the Armenian alphabet. It represents the voiced postalveolar fricative (/ʒ/) in both Eastern and Western varieties of Armenian. Created by Mesrop Mashtots in the 5th century, it has a numerical value of 10. Its shape is visually similar to one other Armenian letter, Ca (ծ). Its shape in lowercase form is also similar to the minuscule form of the Latin letter D (d).

== Gallery ==
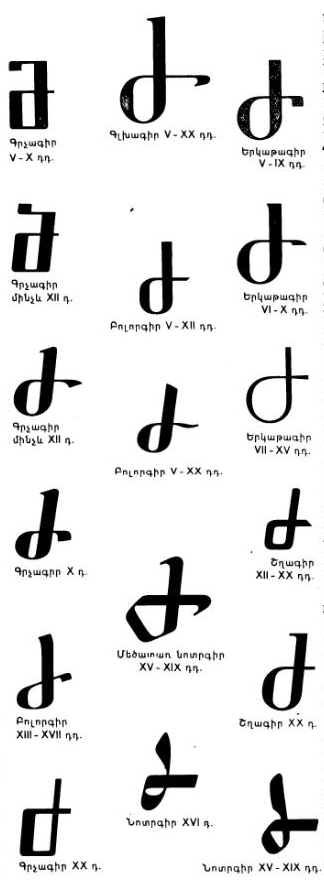
Various historic fonts

Rounded Erkat'agir

Angular Erkat'agir

Bolorgir

Notrgir

Shghagir

Typographic form

Handwritten form

== Computing codes ==
Character information
Preview	Ժ		ժ	
Unicode name	ARMENIAN CAPITAL LETTER ZHE		ARMENIAN SMALL LETTER ZHE	
Encodings	decimal	hex	dec	hex
Unicode	1338	U+053A	1386	U+056A
UTF-8	212 186	D4 BA	213 170	D5 AA
Numeric character reference	&#1338;	&#x53A;	&#1386;	&#x56A;

== See also ==
- Armenian alphabet
- Mesrop Mashtots
- D (Latin)
- Ž
- ծ
- Ж
