= Tsa (letter) =

Letter in the Armenian alphabet

- Ծ ծ

Usage
- Writing system: Armenian script
- Type: Alphabetic
- Language of origin: Armenian language
- Sound values: ts (Eastern Armenian) dz (Western Armenian)
- In Unicode: U+053E, U+056E
- Alphabetical position: 14

History
- Development: 𓏭: 𐤆; 𐡆; 𐮆; Ծ ծ
- Time period: 405 to present

Other
- Associated numbers: 50
- Writing direction: Left-to-Right

Tsa (Eastern) or Dza (Western) (majuscule: Ծ; minuscule: ծ; Armenian: ծա) is the fourteenth letter of the Armenian alphabet, representing the voiceless alveolar affricate (/ts/) in Eastern Armenian and the voiced alveolar affricate (/dz/) in Western Armenian. It is typically romanized with the digraph Ts. It was part of the alphabet created by Mesrop Mashtots in the 5th century CE. In the Armenian numeral system, it has a value of 50.

== Gallery ==
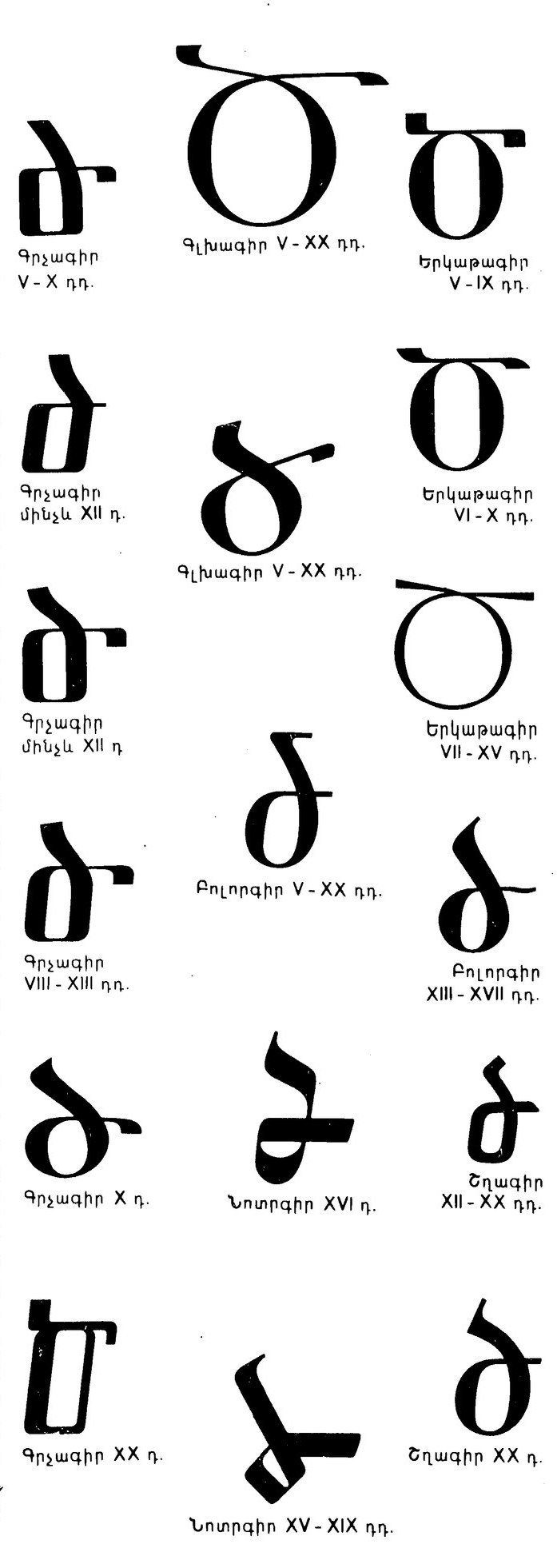
Various historic fonts

Rounded Erkat'agir

Angular Erkat'agir

Bolorgir

Notrgir

Shghagir

Typographic form

Handwritten form

== Character codes ==
Character information
Preview	Ծ		ծ	
Unicode name	ARMENIAN CAPITAL LETTER CA		ARMENIAN SMALL LETTER CA	
Encodings	decimal	hex	dec	hex
Unicode	1342	U+053E	1390	U+056E
UTF-8	212 190	D4 BE	213 174	D5 AE
Numeric character reference	&#1342;	&#x53E;	&#1390;	&#x56E;

== See also ==
- Xe, the letter preceding Tsa in the Armenian alphabet
- Armenian alphabet
