= Che (Armenian) =

Letter in the Armenian alphabet

- Ճ ճ

Usage
- Writing system: Armenian script
- Type: Alphabetic
- Language of origin: Armenian language
- Sound values: t͡ʃ
- In Unicode: U+0543, U+0573
- Alphabetical position: 19

History
- Development: 𓍒: Ϫ ϫ; Ճ ճ
- Time period: 405 to present

Other
- Associated numbers: 100

Che, or Če (majuscule: Ճ; minuscule: ճ; Reformed orthography: ճե; Classical orthography: ճէ) is the nineteenth letter of the Armenian alphabet. It represents the voiceless palato-alveolar affricate (/t͡ʃ/) in standard Eastern Armenian, and the voiced palato-alveolar affricate (/d͡ʒ/) in western varieties of Armenian. Created by Mesrop Mashtots in the 5th century, it has a numerical value of 100. Its shape is visually similar to the Cyrillic letter, Be (б). Its shape in lowercase form is also similar to the minuscule form of the Latin letter B (b).

== Gallery ==
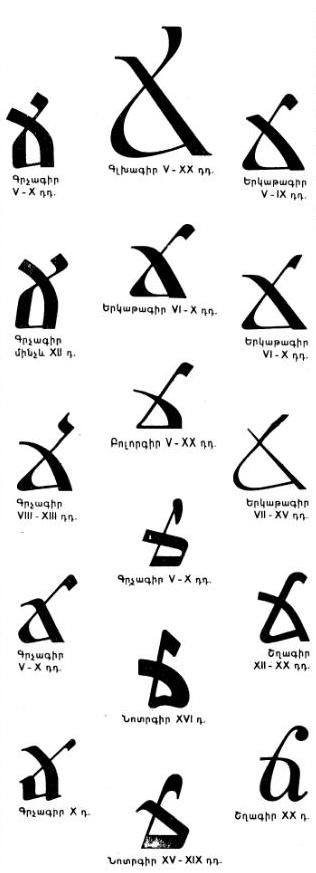
Various historic fonts

Rounded Erkat'agir

Angular Erkat'agir

Bolorgir

Notrgir

Shghagir

Typographic form

Handwritten form

== Computing codes ==
Character information
Preview	Ճ		ճ	
Unicode name	ARMENIAN CAPITAL LETTER CHEH		ARMENIAN SMALL LETTER CHEH	
Encodings	decimal	hex	dec	hex
Unicode	1347	U+0543	1395	U+0573
UTF-8	213 131	D5 83	213 179	D5 B3
Numeric character reference	&#1347;	&#x543;	&#1395;	&#x573;

== See also ==
- Armenian alphabet
- Mesrop Mashtots
- b (Latin)
- б (Cyrillic)
- ч (Cyrillic)
- Ch (digraph)
