= Fe (Armenian) =

Letter in the Armenian alphabet

- Ֆ ֆ

Usage
- Writing system: Armenian script
- Type: Alphabetic
- Language of origin: Armenian language
- Sound values: [f]
- In Unicode: U+0556, U+0586
- Alphabetical position: 38 (Classical); 39 (Reformed)

History
- Development: 𓃻?: 𐤒; Ϙ ϙ; Φ φ; Ֆ ֆ
- Time period: 1037-present
- Transliterations: F

Other
- Associated numbers: None
- Writing direction: Left-to-right

Fe, or Feh (majuscule Ֆ; minuscule ֆ; Reformed orthography: ֆե; Classical orthography: ֆէ; IPA: [fɛ]) is the 39th letter of the reformed Armenian alphabet and the 38th letter of the Classical Armenian alphabet. It does not have a numerical value meaning, as it was not among the original Mashtotsian letters.

== Usage ==
Fe is used to represent the voiceless labiodental fricative /f/.

Contrary to the first 36 letters of the Armenian alphabet, Fe and O were added to the original alphabet in the 11th century.

In the ISO 9985 standard, the letter is transliterated as "f".

== Gallery ==
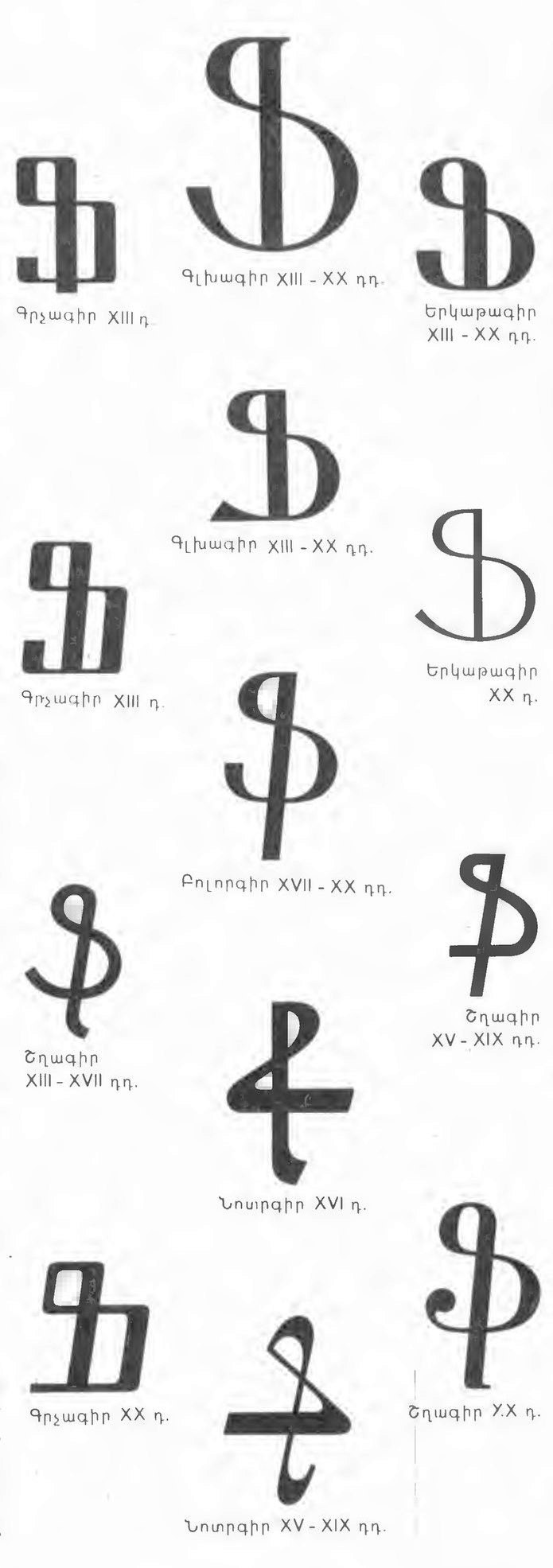
Various historic fonts

Rounded Erkat'agir

Angular Erkat'agir

Bolorgir

Notrgir

Shghagir

Typographical form

Handwritten form

== Computing codes ==
Character information
Preview	Ֆ		ֆ	
Unicode name	ARMENIAN CAPITAL LETTER FEH		ARMENIAN SMALL LETTER FEH	
Encodings	decimal	hex	dec	hex
Unicode	1366	U+0556	1414	U+0586
UTF-8	213 150	D5 96	214 134	D6 86
Numeric character reference	&#1366;	&#x556;	&#1414;	&#x586;
