= Re (Armenian) =

32nd letter in the Armenian alphabet

- Ր ր

Usage
- Writing system: Armenian script
- Type: Alphabetic
- Language of origin: Armenian language
- Sound values: [ɾ]
- In Unicode: U+0550, U+0580
- Alphabetical position: 5000

History
- Development: 𓁶: 𐤓; Ρ ρ; Ր ր
- Time period: 405 to present

Other
- Associated numbers: 5000

Re, or Reh (majuscule: Ր; minuscule: ր; Reformed orthography: րե; Classical orthography: րէ) is the 32nd letter of the Armenian alphabet. It was created by Mesrop Mashtots in the 5th century AD. It has a numerical value of 5000. It represents the voiced alveolar flap (/ɾ/) for Modern Armenian and the voiced alveolar approximant (/ɹ/) for Classical Armenian. It is typically romanized with the letter R. In the Middle Ages, the letter used the "Erkat'agir", "Angular Erkat'agir/Grchagir", "Notrgir" and "Shghagir" fonts.

== Gallery ==
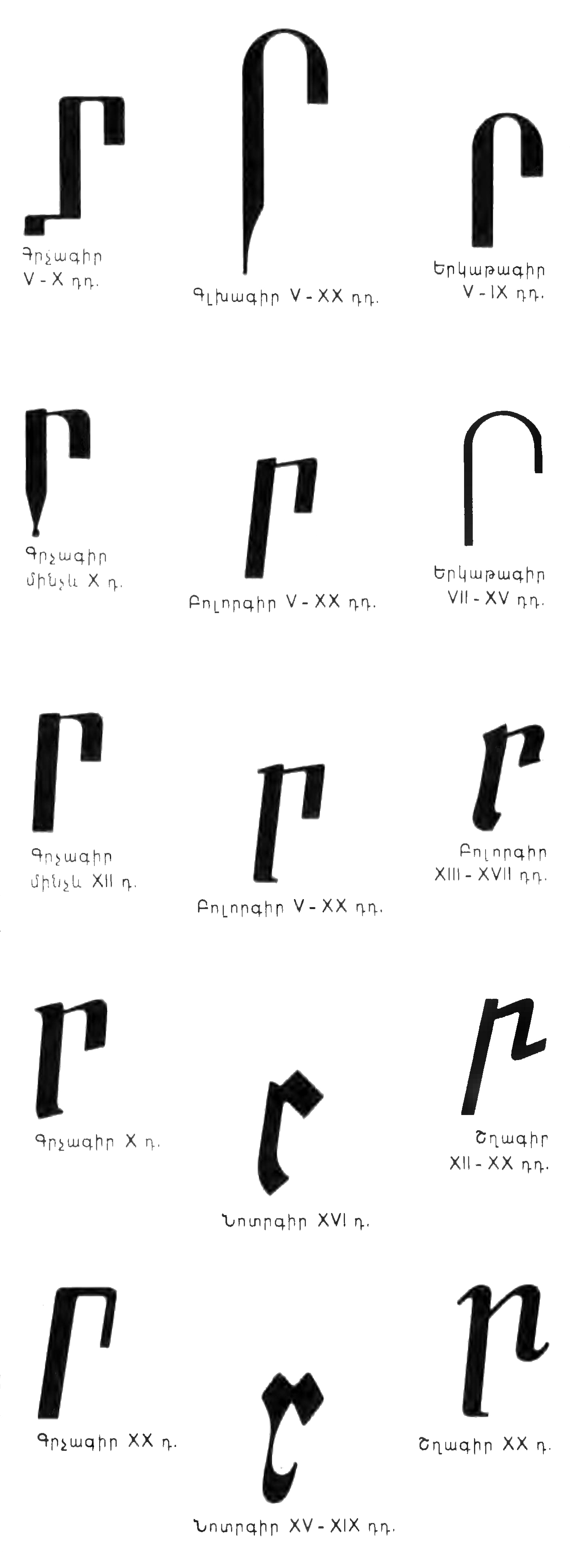
Various historic fonts

Rounded Erkat'agir

Angular Erkat'agir

Bolorgir

Notrgir

Shghagir

Typographic form

Handwritten form

Armenian Braille form Dots-1235

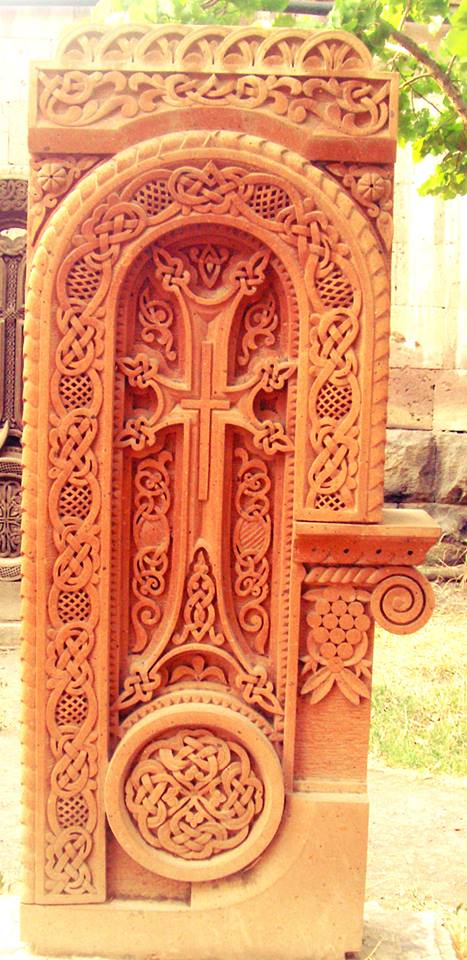
Khachkar «Re» monument at St. Mesrop Mashtots church in Oshakan

== Character codes ==
Character information
Preview	Ր		ր	
Unicode name	ARMENIAN CAPITAL LETTER REH		ARMENIAN SMALL LETTER REH	
Encodings	decimal	hex	dec	hex
Unicode	1360	U+0550	1408	U+0580
UTF-8	213 144	D5 90	214 128	D6 80
Numeric character reference	&#1360;	&#x550;	&#1408;	&#x580;

== Related characters and other similar characters ==
- Ρ ρ : Greek letter Rho
- R r : Latin letter R

== See also ==
- Armenian alphabet
- Mesrop Mashtots
