= T'o =

Letter in the Armenian alphabet

- Թ թ

Usage
- Writing system: Armenian script
- Type: Alphabetic
- Language of origin: Armenian language
- Sound values: tʰ
- In Unicode: U+0539, U+0569
- Alphabetical position: 9

History
- Development: 𓄤: 𐤈; Θ θ; Թ թ
- Time period: 405 to present

Other
- Associated numbers: 9

T'o or To (majuscule: Թ; minuscule: թ; Reformed orthography: թո; Classical orthography: թօ) is the ninth letter of the Armenian alphabet. It has a numerical value of 9. It was created by Mesrop Mashtots in the 5th century AD. It represents the aspirated voiceless alveolar plosive (/tʰ/) on both Eastern and Western Armenian.

== Computing codes ==
Character information
Preview	Թ		թ	
Unicode name	ARMENIAN CAPITAL LETTER TO		ARMENIAN SMALL LETTER TO	
Encodings	decimal	hex	dec	hex
Unicode	1337	U+0539	1385	U+0569
UTF-8	212 185	D4 B9	213 169	D5 A9
Numeric character reference	&#1337;	&#x539;	&#1385;	&#x569;

== Gallery ==
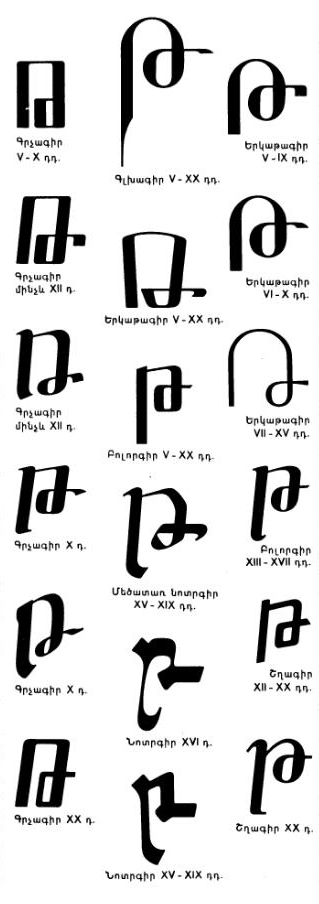
Various historic fonts

Rounded Erkat'agir

Angular Erkat'agir

Bolorgir

Notrgir

Shghagir

Typographic form

Handwritten form

== Related characters and other similar characters ==
- T t : Latin letter T
- Th th : Latin digraph Th
- Ꚋ ꚋ : Cyrillic letter Te with middle hook
- Ҭ ҭ : Cyrillic letter Te with descender
- Ⴒ ⴒ ტ : Georgian letter T'ari
