= Et (letter) =

Letter in the Armenian alphabet

- Ը ը

Usage
- Writing system: Armenian script
- Type: Alphabetic
- Language of origin: Armenian language
- Sound values: [ə]
- In Unicode: U+538, U+568
- Alphabetical position: 8

History
- Development: 𓀠: 𐤄; Ε ε; Ը ը
- Time period: 405 to present

Other
- Associated numbers: 8

Et or Yt (majuscule: Ը: minuscule: ը; Armenian: ըթ) is the eighth letter of the Armenian alphabet created by Mesrop Mashtots in the 5th century. It has a numerical value of 8. It represents the mid-central unrounded vowel (/ə/).

Depending on the system of romanization, it may variously be romanized as ⟨ə⟩, ⟨ë⟩ or ⟨y⟩.

This letter is only written in the beginning or at the end of a word, or in the rare case that it is the only unique vowel in the word (e.g. ֆստըխ, pronounced /fəsˈtəχ/). All other word-medial instances of /ə/ are unwritten and are not represented by the letter Et (e.g. փրկել, pronounced /pʰəɾˈkel/).

== Computing codes ==
Character information
Preview	Ը		ը	
Unicode name	ARMENIAN CAPITAL LETTER ET		ARMENIAN SMALL LETTER ET	
Encodings	decimal	hex	dec	hex
Unicode	1336	U+0538	1384	U+0568
UTF-8	212 184	D4 B8	213 168	D5 A8
Numeric character reference	&#1336;	&#x538;	&#1384;	&#x568;

== Gallery ==
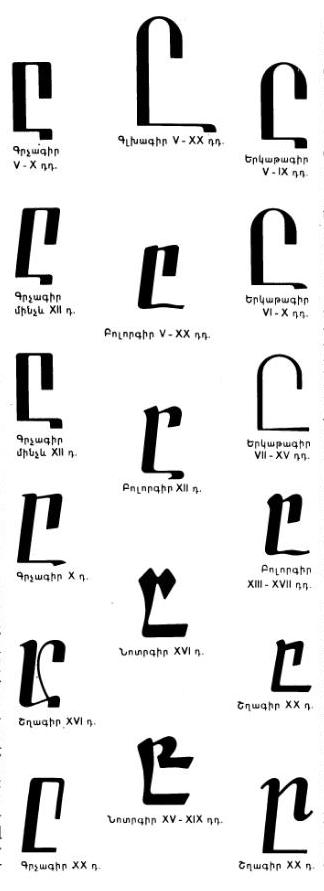
Various historic fonts

Erkat'agir

Grchagir

Bolorgir

Notrgir

Shghagir

Typographic form

Handwritten form
