= Gim (letter) =

Letter in the Armenian alphabet

- Գ գ

Usage
- Writing system: Armenian script
- Type: Alphabetic
- Language of origin: Armenian language
- Sound values: g (Eastern Armenian) kʰ (Western Armenian)
- In Unicode: U+0533, U+0563
- Alphabetical position: 3

History
- Development: 𓌙: 𐤂; Γ γ; Գ գ
- Time period: 405 to present
- Transliterations: G

Other
- Associated numbers: 3

Gim, Kim, or K’im (majuscule: Գ; minuscule: գ; Armenian: գիմ) is the third letter of the Armenian alphabet, representing the voiced velar plosive /g/ in Eastern Armenian and the aspirated voiceless velar plosive /kʰ/ in Western Armenian. It is typically romanized with the letter G. It was part of the alphabet created by Mesrop Mashtots in the 5th century CE. In the Armenian numeral system, it has a value of 3.

== Character codes ==
Character information
Preview	Գ		գ	
Unicode name	ARMENIAN CAPITAL LETTER GIM		ARMENIAN SMALL LETTER GIM	
Encodings	decimal	hex	dec	hex
Unicode	1331	U+0533	1379	U+0563
UTF-8	212 179	D4 B3	213 163	D5 A3
Numeric character reference	&#1331;	&#x533;	&#1379;	&#x563;

== Gallery ==
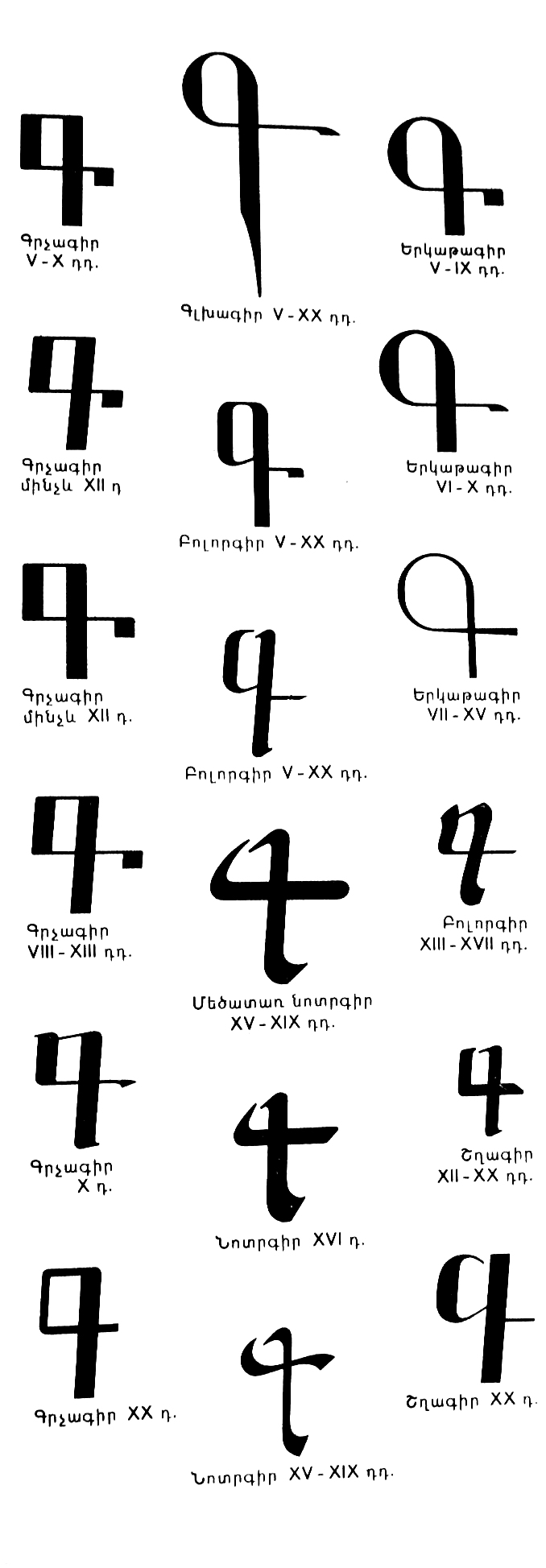
Various historic forms

Rounded Erkat'agir

Angular Erkat'agir

Bolorgir

Notrgir

Shghagir

Typographic form

Handwritten form

Eastern Armenian Braille form Dots-1245

Western Armenian Braille form Dots-12345

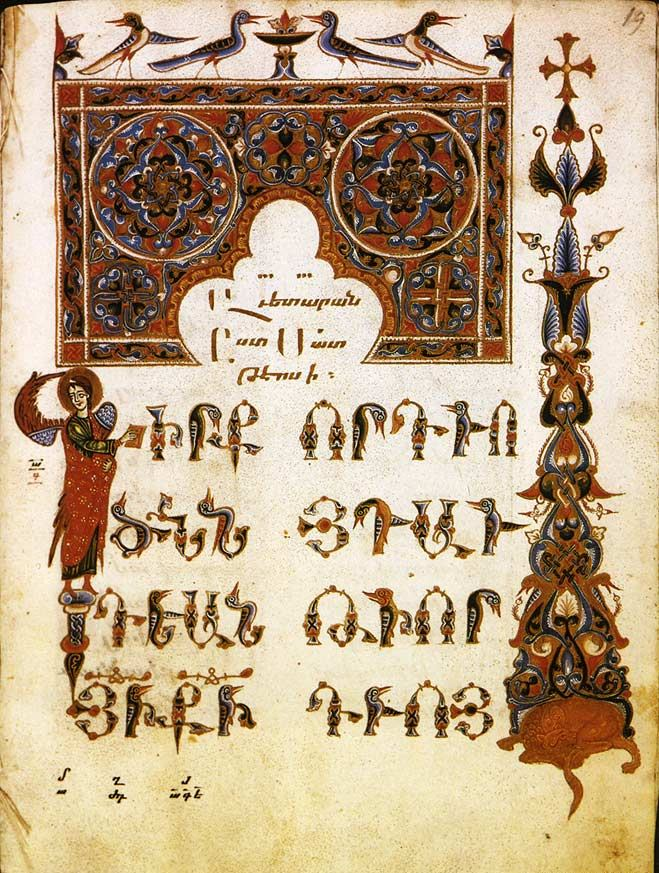
Capital letter «Gim» in XIII century manuscript
