= Ghat (letter) =

Letter in the Armenian alphabet

- Ղ ղ

Usage
- Writing system: Armenian script
- Type: Alphabetic
- Language of origin: Armenian language
- Sound values: ʁ, ɫ
- In Unicode: U+0542, U+0572
- Alphabetical position: 18

History
- Development: 𓋿: 𐤋; Λ λ; Ղ ղ
- Time period: 405 to present

Other
- Associated numbers: 90

Ghat, Ghad, or Ġat (majuscule: Ղ; minuscule: ղ; Armenian: ղատ) is the eighteenth letter of the Armenian alphabet. It represents the voiced uvular fricative (/ʁ/) in both Eastern and Western varieties of Armenian. In Classical Armenian, it is pronounced as the velarized alveolar lateral approximant (/ɫ/). Created by Mesrop Mashtots in the 5th century, it has a numerical value of 90.

== Gallery ==
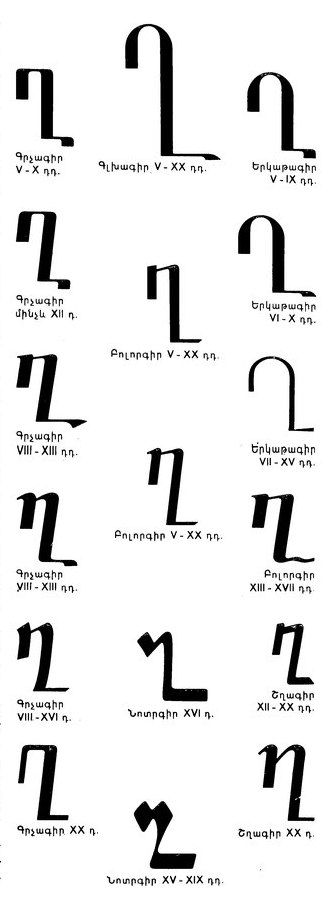
Various historic fonts

Rounded Erkat'agir

Angular Erkat'agir

Bolorgir

Notrgir

Shghagir

Typographic form

Handwritten form

== Computing codes ==
Character information
Preview	Ղ		ղ	
Unicode name	ARMENIAN CAPITAL LETTER GHAD		ARMENIAN SMALL LETTER GHAD	
Encodings	decimal	hex	dec	hex
Unicode	1346	U+0542	1394	U+0572
UTF-8	213 130	D5 82	213 178	D5 B2
Numeric character reference	&#1346;	&#x542;	&#1394;	&#x572;

== See also ==
- Armenian alphabet
- Mesrop Mashtots
- Velarized alveolar lateral approximant
