= Lyun =

Letter in the Armenian alphabet

- Լ լ

Usage
- Writing system: Armenian script
- Type: Alphabet
- Language of origin: Armenian language
- Sound values: l
- In Unicode: U+053C, U+056C
- Alphabetical position: 12

History
- Time period: 405-present

Other
- Associated numbers: 30
- Writing direction: Left-to-right

Lyun, Lyown, or Liwn (majuscule: Լ; minuscule: լ; Reformed orthography: լյուն; Classical orthography: լիւն) is the twelfth letter of the Armenian alphabet. It represents the voiced alveolar lateral approximant /l/. It is typically romanized with the letter L. Created by Mesrop Mashtots, it has a numerical value of 30.

== Gallery ==
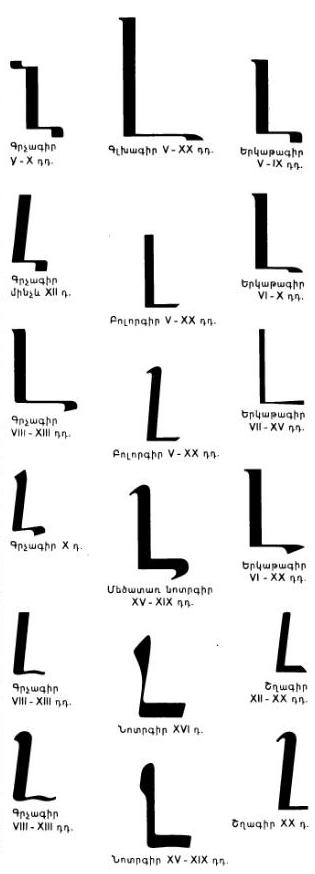
Various historic fonts

Rounded Erkat'agir

Angular Erkat'agir

Bolorgir

Notrgir

Shghagir

Typographic form

Handwritten form

== Computing codes ==
Character information
| Preview | Լ | | լ | |
|---|---|---|---|---|
| Unicode name | ARMENIAN CAPITAL LETTER LIWN | | ARMENIAN SMALL LETTER LIWN | |
| Encodings | decimal | hex | dec | hex |
| Unicode | 1340 | U+053C | 1388 | U+056C |
| UTF-8 | 212 188 | D4 BC | 213 172 | D5 AC |
| Numeric character reference | &#1340; | &#x53C; | &#1388; | &#x56C; |

== See also ==
- L (Latin)
- Armenian alphabet
- Mesrop Mashtots
