= Xe (letter) =

Letter in the Armenian alphabet

- Խ խ

Usage
- Writing system: Armenian script
- Type: Alphabetic
- Language of origin: Armenian language
- Sound values: χ
- In Unicode: U+053D, U+056D
- Alphabetical position: 13

History
- Time period: 405 to present

Other
- Associated numbers: 40
- Writing direction: Left-to-Right

Xe, or Xeh (majuscule: Խ; minuscule: խ; Reformed orthography: խե; Classical orthography: խէ) is the thirteenth letter of the Armenian alphabet. It represents the voiceless uvular fricative (/χ/) in both Eastern and Western varieties of Armenian. Created by Mesrop Mashtots in the 5th century, it has a numerical value of 40.

== Gallery ==
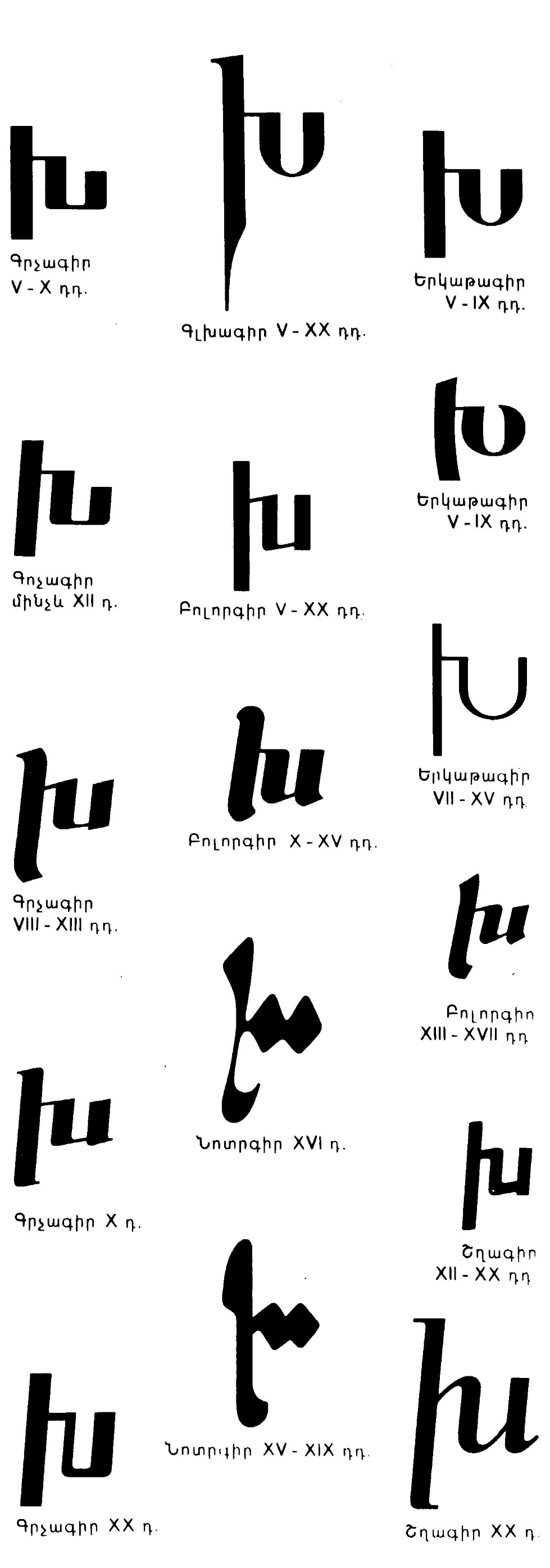
Various historic fonts

Rounded Erkat'agir

Angular Erkat'agir

Bolorgir

Notrgir

Shghagir

Typographic form

Handwritten form

== Computing codes ==
Character information
Preview	Խ		խ	
Unicode name	ARMENIAN CAPITAL LETTER XEH		ARMENIAN SMALL LETTER XEH	
Encodings	decimal	hex	dec	hex
Unicode	1341	U+053D	1389	U+056D
UTF-8	212 189	D4 BD	213 173	D5 AD
Numeric character reference	&#1341;	&#x53D;	&#1389;	&#x56D;

== See also ==
- Armenian alphabet
- Mesrop Mashtots
- X (Latin)
- Х (Cyrillic)
