= Se (Armenian) =

Letter in the Armenian alphabet

- Ս ս

Usage
- Writing system: Armenian script
- Type: Alphabetic
- Language of origin: Armenian language
- Sound values: [s]
- In Unicode: U+054D, U+057D
- Alphabetical position: 29

History
- Time period: 405 to present

Other
- Associated numbers: 2000
- Writing direction: Left-to-Right

Se or Seh (majuscule: Ս, minuscule: ս; Reformed orthography: սե; Classical orthography: սէ) is the twenty-ninth letter of the Armenian alphabet. It has a numerical value of 2000. It represents the voiceless alveolar sibilant (/s/) in both Eastern Armenian and Western Armenian. Created by Mesrop Mashtots in the 5th century AD, it is homoglyphic to the Latin letter U.

== Gallery ==
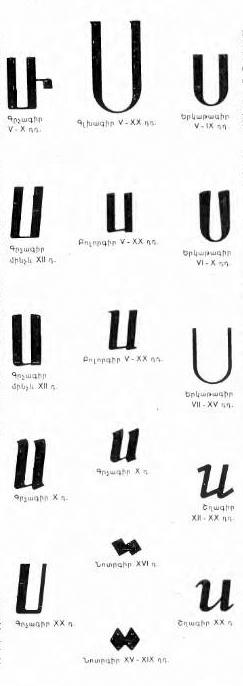
Various historical fonts

Rounded Erkat'agir

Angular Erkat'agir

Bolorgir

Notrgir

Shghagir

Typographic form

Handwritten form

== Computing codes ==
Character information
Preview	Ս		ս	
Unicode name	ARMENIAN CAPITAL LETTER SEH		ARMENIAN SMALL LETTER SEH	
Encodings	decimal	hex	dec	hex
Unicode	1357	U+054D	1405	U+057D
UTF-8	213 141	D5 8D	213 189	D5 BD
Numeric character reference	&#1357;	&#x54D;	&#1405;	&#x57D;

== Related characters and other similar characters ==
- S s : Latin letter S
- С с : Cyrillic letter Es
- Ⴑ ⴑ ს : Georgian letter Sani
- Σ σ ς : Greek letter Sigma
- U u : Latin letter U
- ꓴ : Lisu letter U

== See also ==
- Armenian alphabet
- Mesrop Mashtots
