= Je (Armenian) =

- Ջ ջ

Usage
- Writing system: Armenian script
- Type: Alphabetic
- Language of origin: Armenian
- Sound values: [d͡ʒ] (Eastern) [t͡ʃʰ] (Western)
- In Unicode: U+054B, U+057B
- Alphabetical position: 27

History
- Time period: 405-present
- Transliterations: Latin: dzh/ǰ

Other
- Associated numbers: 900
- Writing direction: Left to right

Je, or Jheh (majuscule: Ջ; minuscule: ջ; Reformed orthography: ջե; Classical orthography: ջէ) is the 27th letter of the Armenian alphabet. It is pronounced as the voiced postalveolar affricate [d͡ʒ] in Eastern Armenian and the voiceless postalveolar aspirated affricate [t͡ʃʰ] in Western Armenian. Created by Mesrop Mashtots in the 5th century, it is also used to represent the number 900. It can also be transliterated as ǰ.

== Computing codes ==
Character information
Preview	Ջ		ջ	
Unicode name	ARMENIAN CAPITAL LETTER JHEH		ARMENIAN SMALL LETTER JHEH	
Encodings	decimal	hex	dec	hex
Unicode	1355	U+054B	1403	U+057B
UTF-8	213 139	D5 8B	213 187	D5 BB
Numeric character reference	&#1355;	&#x54B;	&#1403;	&#x57B;

== Gallery ==
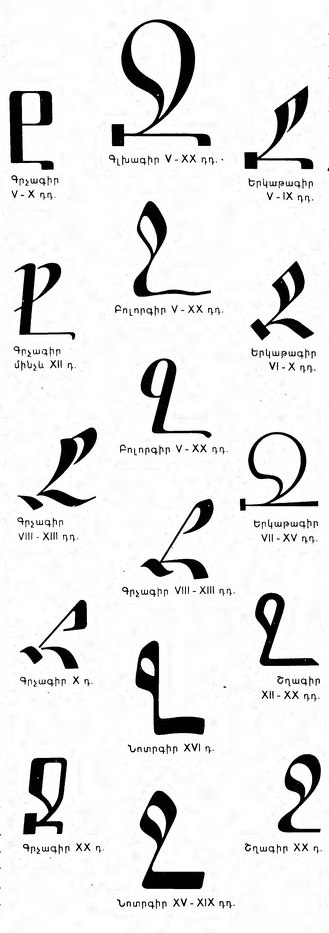
Various historic fonts

Rounded Erkat'agir

Angular Erkat'agir

Bolorgir

Notrgir

Shghagir

Typographic form

Handwritten form
