= Dza (letter) =

Letter in the Armenian alphabet

- Ձ ձ

Usage
- Writing system: Armenian script
- Type: Alphabetic
- Language of origin: Armenian language
- Sound values: [dz] (Eastern) [tsʰ] (Western)
- In Unicode: U+0541, U+0571
- Alphabetical position: 17

History
- Time period: 405 to present

Other
- Associated numbers: 80
- Writing direction: Left-to-Right

Dza (Eastern) or Tsa (Western) (majuscule: Ձ; minuscule: ձ; Armenian: ձա) is the seventeenth letter of the Armenian alphabet. It represents the voiced alveolar affricate (/d͡z/) in Eastern and the voiceless aspirated alveolar affricate (/t͡sʰ/) in Western varieties of Armenian. Created by Mesrop Mashtots in the 5th century, it has a numerical value of 80. Its shape in capital form similar to the Arabic numeral 2.

== Gallery ==
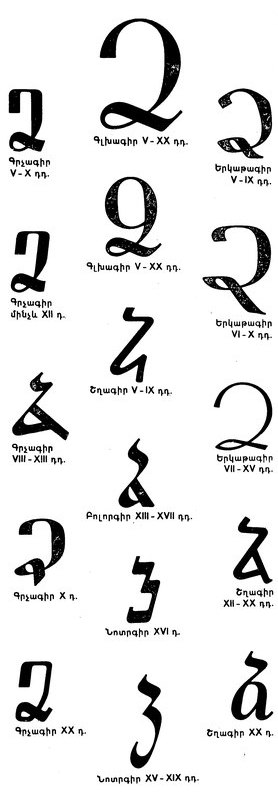
Various historic fonts

Rounded Erkat'agir

Angular Erkat'agir

Bolorgir

Notrgir

Shghagir

Typographic form

Handwritten form

== Computing codes ==
Character information
Preview	Ձ		ձ	
Unicode name	ARMENIAN CAPITAL LETTER JA		ARMENIAN SMALL LETTER JA	
Encodings	decimal	hex	dec	hex
Unicode	1345	U+0541	1393	U+0571
UTF-8	213 129	D5 81	213 177	D5 B1
Numeric character reference	&#1345;	&#x541;	&#1393;	&#x571;

== See also ==
- Armenian alphabet
- Mesrop Mashtots
- 2
- Arabic numerals
