= Tyun =

Letter in the Armenian alphabet

- Տ տ

Usage
- Writing system: Armenian script
- Type: Alphabetic
- Language of origin: Armenian language
- Sound values: [t] [d]
- In Unicode: U+054F, U+057F
- Alphabetical position: 31

History
- Time period: 405 to present

Other
- Associated numbers: 4000

Tyun, Tyown, or Tiwn (majuscule: Տ; minuscule: տ; Reformed orthography: տյուն; Classical orthography: տիւն) is the thirty-first letter of the Armenian alphabet. It represents the voiceless alveolar plosive /t/ in Eastern Armenian and the voiced alveolar plosive /d/ in Western Armenian. It is typically romanized with the letter T (or D, depending on the dialect). Created by Mesrop Mashtots in the 5th century, it has a numerical value of 4000. The uppercase Տ is similar to the Latin uppercase S, whilst the lowercase տ is like a ligature of the lowercase u and n.

== Gallery ==
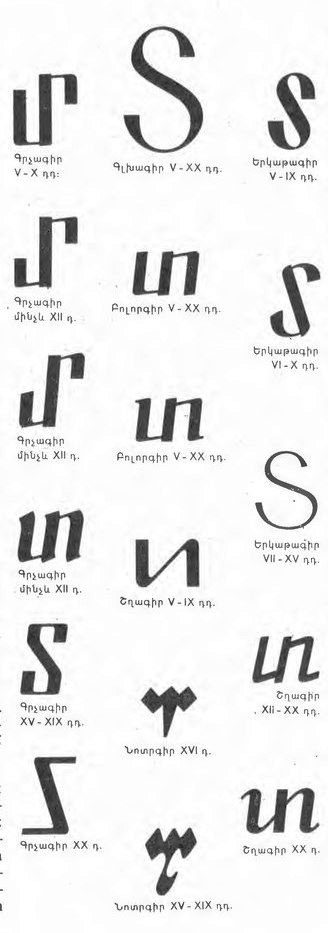
Various historic fonts

Rounded Erkat'agir

Angular Erkat'agir

Bolorgir

Notrgir

Shghagir

Typographic form

Handwritten form

== Computing codes ==
Character information
Preview	Տ		տ	
Unicode name	ARMENIAN CAPITAL LETTER TIWN		ARMENIAN SMALL LETTER TIWN	
Encodings	decimal	hex	dec	hex
Unicode	1359	U+054F	1407	U+057F
UTF-8	213 143	D5 8F	213 191	D5 BF
Numeric character reference	&#1359;	&#x54F;	&#1407;	&#x57F;

== See also ==
- Armenian alphabet
- Mesrop Mashtots
- T
