= Armenian numerals =

Armenian numerals form a historic numeral system created using the majuscules (uppercase letters) of the Armenian alphabet.

There was no notation for zero in the old system, and the numeric values for individual letters were added together. The principles behind this system are the same as for the ancient Greek numerals and Hebrew numerals. In modern Armenia, the familiar Arabic numerals are used. In contemporary writing, Armenian numerals are used more or less like Roman numerals in modern English, e.g. Գարեգին Բ. means Garegin II and Գ. գլուխ means Chapter III (as a headline).

The final two letters of the Armenian alphabet, "o" (Օ) and "fe" (Ֆ), were added to the Armenian alphabet only after Arabic numerals were already in use, to facilitate transliteration of other languages. Thus, they sometimes have a numerical value assigned to them.

== Notation ==
As in Hebrew and ancient notation, in Armenian numerals distinct symbols represent multiples of powers of 10, from 1 to 9, 10 to 90, 100 to 900, 1,000 to 9,000, and 10,000 and 20,000. A number is written from left to right, composed from at most one of these symbols for each power of 10, arranged in descending order by magnitude. There is no symbol for zero: for a number like 600 or 9,007, missing powers of ten are simply not represented.

To write numbers greater than 9,999, it is necessary to have numerals with values greater than 9,000. This is done by drawing a line over them, indicating that their value is to be multiplied by 10,000. This is similar to Roman numerals, where a line over a character means multiplying the corresponding value by 1,000.

Armenian numerals
1	2	3	4	5	6	7	8	9
Ա	Բ	Գ	Դ	Ե	Զ	Է	Ը	Թ
10	20	30	40	50	60	70	80	90
Ժ	Ի	Լ	Խ	Ծ	Կ	Հ	Ձ	Ղ
100	200	300	400	500	600	700	800	900
Ճ	Մ	Յ	Ն	Շ	Ո	Չ	Պ	Ջ
1000	2000	3000	4000	5000	6000	7000	8000	9000
Ռ	Ս	Վ	Տ	Ր	Ց	Ւ	Փ	Ք
10000	20000							
Օ	Ֆ							

== Examples ==
- ՌՋՀԵ. = 1975 = 1000 + 900 + 70 + 5
- ՍՄԻԲ. = 2222 = 2000 + 200 + 20 + 2
- ՃԻ. = 120 = 100 + 20
- ՍԴ. = 2004 = 2000 + 4
- Ծ. = 50
- Ա̅. = 10,000 = 1 × 10,000
- Ջ̅. = 9,000,000 = 900 × 10,000
- Ռ̅Ճ̅Խ̅Գ̅ՌՄԾԵ. = 11,431,255 = 1,143 × 10,000 + 1,255

== Shirakatsi notation ==
In the 7th century, Anania Shirakatsi developed a unique numerical notation derived from the older Armenian alphabetic system using just 12 letters to express any number up to 10,000. For the units, he used the first nine letters (Ա, Բ, Գ, Դ, Ե, Զ, Է, Ը, Թ), similar to the traditional system. The letters used for 10, 100, and 1000 were also identical to the traditional Armenian system (Ժ, Ճ, Ռ), but all other numbers up to 10,000 were written with these 12 letters. For instance, 50 would be written ԵԺ (5×10) and not Ծ as in the standard system. Thus, the notation is multiplicative-additive as opposed to the ciphered-additive standard system.
