= History of the Armenian alphabet =

Armenian palaeography is a branch of palaeography that examines the historical development of Armenian script forms and lettering. It also encompasses a description of the evolution of Armenian writing.

The Armenian alphabet was devised in 405 in the cities of Edessa and Samsat by the scholar-monk Mesrop Mashtots. As is the case with other writing systems worldwide, the graphic layout of Armenian letters has undergone some changes in over 1600 years. The four principal graphic forms of Armenian writing during the Middle Ages are Erkat'agir, Bolorgir, Notrgir and Shghagir. The first of these is an all caps form, while the other three are minuscule forms of lettering. The most prevalent forms were Erkat'agir and Bolorgir. Within each of these forms, certain variations are possible.

== History of the study ==
=== Background ===
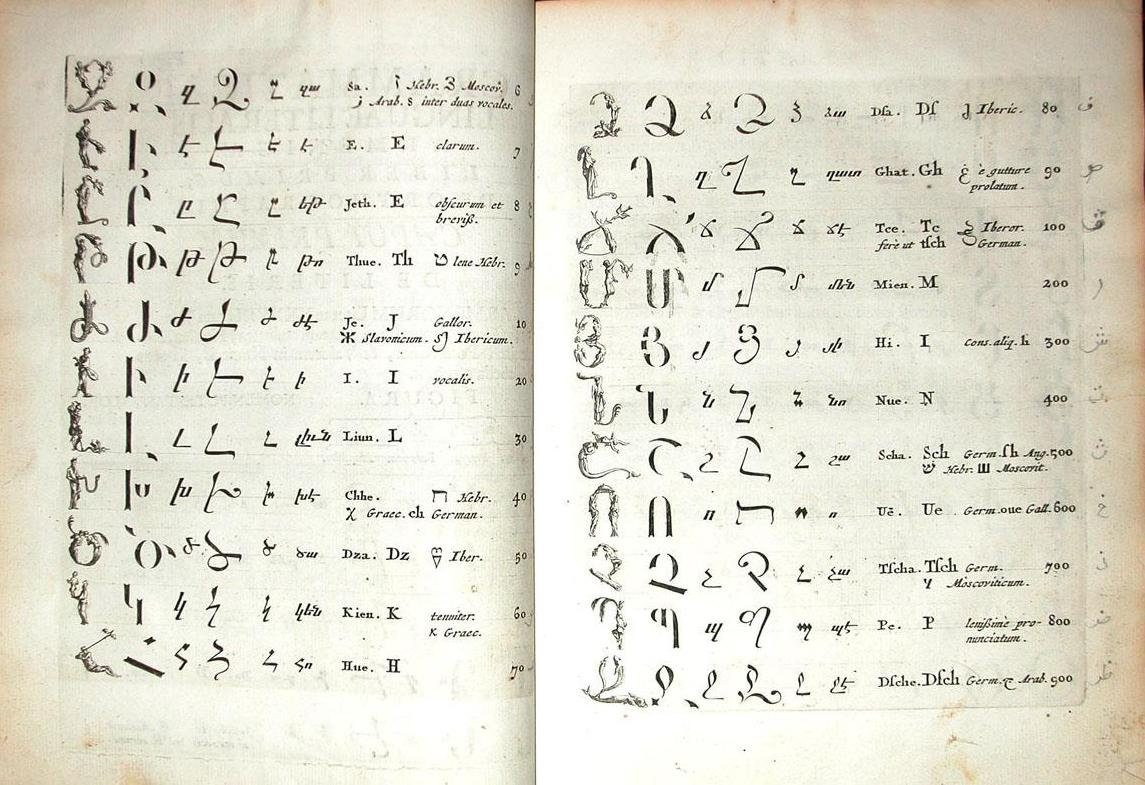
Page of the Thesaurus linguae Armenicae antiquae et hodiernae by Johann Schroeder, 1711

Some researchers posit that the origins of the classification of handwritten scripts can be traced back to the earliest discussions on the art of writing, as documented in the earliest Armenian works on grammar. Towards the end of the 5th century, the Art of Grammar by Dionysius Thrax was translated into Armenian by the Hellenizing School. A number of medieval Armenian commentaries address this grammar and the broader field of grammar. The authors of these commentaries are David the Invincible, Anonymous, Movses Kertog, Stepanos Syunetsi, Grigor Hamam, and Grigor Magistros, who lived between the 6th and 11th centuries. The sixth section of Dionysius' work is entitled Writings. All Armenian commentators dedicated this section to the letters of the alphabet as well, titling it On the Writings (Armenian: Յաղագս տառի). The sections vary in length, ranging from one to six pages, and all address phonetic and other aspects of the 36 letters of the Armenian alphabet. Amam's commentary is the only one to provide a brief imaginative description of each of the Armenian letters. The most significant of the subsequent Armenian authors to engage with the subject of grammar were the 13th-century writers Vardan Areveltsi and Hovhannes Erznkatsi.

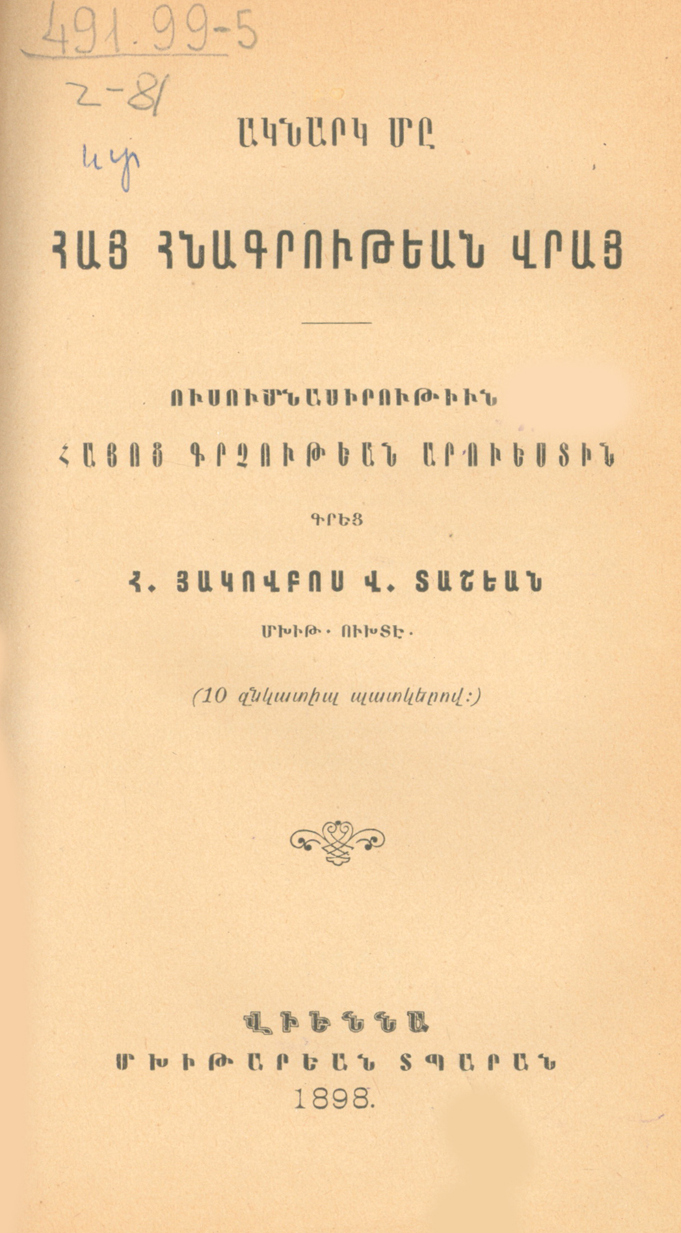
Title page of A. Tashyan's book Review of Armenian Palaeography, 1898

The later scholars of the Armenian alphabet, Rivola, Schroeder and Anonymous, were influenced, though not always, by this section of Dionysius' grammar, as well as by his Armenian translators and commentators. In addition to the aforementioned standard list of letters, these later authors also provided brief comments on the various fonts used to write in Armenian.

Paleographic issues, particularly those pertaining to the classification of scripts, have been addressed in a multitude of works collectively referred to as manuals for scribes. The earliest of these works was produced in the 12th century in Cilician Armenia and is attributed to Aristax Grich. It is entitled An Open Study of Various Words. A work by the 13th-century scholar Grigor Skevratsi, entitled Instruction on the Art of Writing, is also worthy of mention. In the 15th century, Gregory of Tatev composed commentaries on both authors. The differentiation between the different types of Armenian script is likely to have originated from such works, rather than from grammars. By the beginning of the 17th century, grammatical works on the Armenian language created in Western languages according to the Western scientific model included a classification of handwritten scripts.

Tables depicting foreign alphabets were already a popular phenomenon in Europe by the 16th century, even before the formation of palaeography as a scientific discipline at the turn of the 17th-18th centuries. Among the earliest books to include references to the Armenian alphabet is Recueil d'anciennes écritures, compiled in 1566-1567 by Pierre Hamon, secretary to King Charles IX of France. The 21st sheet of this work contains an alphabet of Armenian origin, which Hamon states he copied from a collection at Fontainebleau. In 1623, the Sacred Congregation for the Propagation of the Faith published a brief Alphabetum Armenum, which included poorly written Armenian subheadings. In this brief pamphlet, the alphabetical table occupies four pages, yet there is no mention of the font types used.

In the earliest scientific literature on the subject, the names of Armenian medieval writing forms can be found. These discussions date back to the proto-palaeographic period. In 1624, Francesco Rivola published his Grammar of the Armenian language, in which he discussed three forms of Armenian writing: bolorgir (Poluerchir, Orbicularis nempe littera), notrgir (Noderchir, idest, Notariorum littera) and erkat'agir (Erghathachir, Ferrea ... littera). Scientific discussions on the types of Armenian scripts continued during the emergence of palaeography as a scientific discipline at the turn of the XVII-XVIII centuries. In 1711, Johann Schröder dealt with palaeographic issues in the section De Orthographia of his work The Treasures of the Armenian Language. Schröder gave a one-page table of the different forms of Armenian script with comments. In 1730, an anonymous author prepared a grammar of the Armenian language in French, which also contains a section on Armenian writing styles under the title De l'orthographe. In 1823, in the section Des Lettres, des Syllables, et des Signes orthographiques of his voluminous Grammar, the head of the Armenian language department of the School of Oriental Languages in Paris, Jacques Chahan de Cirbied, provided general data on the different types of Armenian writing and their use. The latter compared the evolution of the Armenian script with that of different types of Latin scripts. In a pioneering move, Jrpetian proposed a periodisation of the development of each type. Paleographic issues are also addressed in Mesrop Ter-Arutyunyan's Grammar of the Armenian Language, published in 1826. Mekhitarist Gukas Inchichian provides the most comprehensive analysis of the topic in the third volume of his Archaeological Description of the Armenian Land, published in 1835.

=== Beginning of scientific study ===
However, Armenian palaeography has been an autonomous discipline since the end of the 19th century. The scientific study of Armenian palaeography commenced in 1898 with the publication of A. Tashyan's list of Armenian manuscripts from the Vienna Mekhitarist Book Depository and the first manual on Armenian palaeography. The impetus for its composition was the discovery of a Greek-Armenian papyrus in Egypt. The book provides a detailed account of medieval types of writings, including their historical nomenclature, chronology, and questions pertaining to palimpsests. Tashyan's classification of Armenian scripts has retained its scientific value to this day. In 1892, I. Harutyunyan published Armenian Letters, which considered some issues of Armenian palaeography. The history of Armenian letters and the art of the handwritten book are considered in the book The Art of Writing among Ancient Armenians by G. Hovsepyan (1913). This facsimile album contains 143 samples of Armenian writing from the 5th to 18th centuries, produced on soft materials such as parchment, stone, or metal. Hovsepian's work continues to be of significance to this day. Prior to the Soviet era, only two specialized works on Armenian palaeography were published.

Hrachia Acharian's Armenian Letters (1928) offers a comprehensive analysis of the historical development of Armenian writing, from its origins to its graphic evolution. The book is a significant contribution to the field of palaeography. In his book, Acharyan makes use of the works of Tashyan and Hovsepyan. K. Kafadarian's book, The Original Forms of Armenian Writing (1939), is of certain scientific value. The topic of the origin of Armenian letters and their connection with Aramaic letters is the subject of A. Perikhanian's article, To the Question of the Origin of Armenian Writing. A. Abrahamyan made a significant contribution to the study of the history and graphic evolution of Armenian scripts with his 1959 monograph, The History of Armenian Writing and Script. The latter section of the text deals with the issues of abbreviations, ideograms, cryptograms, and so forth. Stepan Melik-Bakhshyan's Armenian Palaeography was published in 1987. Additionally, G. Levonyan, Levon Khacheryan, E. Aghayan, and others have also contributed to the field of Armenian palaeography A significant contribution to the study of the subject was the publication between 1960 and 1973 of the Code of Armenian Inscriptions, comprising four volumes.

In 2002, the Album of Armenian Palaeography was published by M. Stone, D. Koyumjian and H. Lehman. The work was duly acknowledged as a significant contribution to the field of Armenian studies. An Armenian version of the album by Gohar Muradyan and Aram Topchyan was published in 2006.

== Armenian script ==
The Armenian language employs the original Armenian alphabet, which was created in 405 by the scientist and priest Mesrop Mashtots. Its emergence marked a significant turning point in the spiritual development of Armenians. Initially, the alphabet consisted of 36 letters, 7 of which conveyed vowel sounds and 29 of which conveyed consonants. In this composition, the signs are presented in the Old Armenian translation of the Art of Grammar by Dionysius Thrax, which was completed in the second half of the 5th century. The same order and number are observed in the acrostics of the 7th-century poets Komitas Aghtsetsi and Davtak Kertogh. The Armenian alphabet precisely reflects the phoneme structure of the Armenian language, which has remained largely unchanged for over 1,600 years. Researchers such as Hübschmann, Meillet, Markwart and others have described it as "the most perfect phonetic writing for its time". The addition of two letters, Օ and Ֆ, occurred in the 11th century. (Note: The first example of the letter օ is from 1046 in the word փափագանօք, the first example of the letter ֆ is from 1037 in the name Մուֆարզին)

Theories abound regarding the origins of the Armenian script. Some scholars have proposed that Mashtots may have adopted or utilized Greek, Middle Persian, or Aramaic scripts as a foundation for the Armenian script. Muller postulated that the Armenian script originated from the Semitic peoples and Avesta. Sevak proposed the possibility of a South Semitic origin. Subsequently, Olderogge identified parallels between the Armenian and Ethiopic scripts. According to the aforementioned sources, the majority of scholars attribute Mashtots' alphabet to either the Pahlavi (Middle Persian) or Aramaic alphabets. Such specialists include Marquart, Junker, and Peters. Jensen posits that the degree of influence of these graphical patterns on Armenian writing remains unclear. Gamkrelidze posits that the letters of the Armenian script were the result of the original creativity of their creator, operating according to a certain principle. This principle does not preclude the possibility of using available graphic samples of different writing systems. Muravyov postulates the complete independence of the Armenian script.

== The oldest monuments of the Armenian script ==
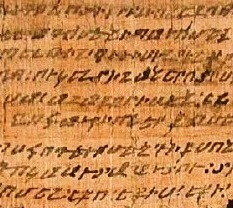
A fragment of a Greco-Armenian papyrus. Dated from the 5th to the 7th centuries

The earliest surviving monuments of Armenian writing are of significant importance for the development of a methodology for describing the evolution of Armenian writing. The earliest surviving example of Armenian epigraphy is the inscription of the feudal lord Saake Kamsarakan, carved on the temple in Tekor. This inscription is dated to at least 490 CE, which places it at the latest in the period of time following the death of Mashtots, the inventor of Armenian script. The inscription is not clearly dated, but the second line mentions Catholicos John Mandakuni as the founder of the monastery, who held this position between 478 and 490. In addition, among the earliest Armenian inscriptions, scholars distinguish an inscription from Dvin of the 6th century and an inscription from the Saint Hripsime Church of 618. Additionally, an undated Armenian inscription from the 5th century and a mosaic from the 5th to 6th centuries have been preserved in the Holy Land.

The earliest extant manuscripts on parchment date back to the 5th and 6th centuries. (Note: Fragments of the oldest manuscript with 5th century writing are preserved in the material used to bind a 13th century manuscript. The manuscript is preserved in the Matenadaran under the number 1577.) The oldest surviving examples of Armenian writing are also preserved in palimpsests, (Note: In Matenadaran such manuscripts include Nos. 1, 9, 14, 28, 41, 48, 77, 90, 436, 463, 1256, 1261, 1266.) including the Sanasar Gospel, which was written on a 5th-century text. A Greco-Armenian papyrus discovered in Egypt at the end of the 19th century is dated to no later than 640. The papyrus contains a Greek text written in Armenian letters. The earliest surviving manuscript in Armenian that can be clearly dated is the Gospel of Queen Mlke, created in 862. The Lazarev Gospel, transcribed in 887, is also of significance for the field of Armenian palaeography. Prior to the composition of these Gospels, the undated Vehamor Gospel was created, which is typically dated by scholars to the 7th to 8th centuries. This manuscript is presumed to be the oldest surviving complete Armenian text. The earliest surviving Armenian manuscript on paper is dated to 981. (Note: Kouymjian dates the manuscript to 971 or 981.) The text is written in the Erkat'agir and Bolorgir scripts. The manuscript is also noteworthy for being the earliest known copy of the Bolorgir script.

Other significant discoveries include a Sasanian gold ring with a gem in Old Armenian. The inscription is engraved with a rounded Erkat'agir and is dated to the period of the V-VII centuries.

In the early stages of Armenian writing, parchment was the predominant writing material, with papyrus not being used in Armenia. In the middle of the 20th century, there were approximately 24,000 Armenian manuscripts (more than 30,000 according to modern data). The process of scientific cataloguing commenced in the 18th century. The majority of Armenian manuscripts are dated. Both the manuscripts and the lapidary inscriptions belonging to the first centuries of writing are characterised by a high degree of stability in the inscriptions.

== Evolution of Armenian writing ==
One of the most significant palaeographic questions concerns the forms of letters that Mesrop Mashtots himself employed. The majority of scholars concur that Mashtots devised and employed a script analogous to the current designation of Mesrop's Erkat'agir. This large, upright and rounded majuscule is a type of lettering that is found in early inscriptions. It is postulated that from this inaugural form of Erkat'agir, the rectilinear Erkat'agir and various permutations of all caps subsequently evolved. This script subsequently evolved into Bolorgir, which in turn gave rise to Notrgir and Shghagir. Consequently, the letterforms underwent a series of developmental stages. A number of manuscripts with transitional scripts have survived. V. Calzolari and M. Stone propose that the original form of Erkat'agir must have been more skoropis and italicised, akin to the Greek and Syriac scripts of the period. It is considered implausible that Mashtots and his disciples could have employed the laborious method of Erkat'agir to translate the Bible, a task that would have taken decades.

The term gir (writing) is found in all four names of Armenian letter forms. Medieval sources mention only three names: Erkat'agir, bolorgir and notrgir. In contrast, shghagir is a relatively new term.

Letter	Uppercase		Lowercase		
Letter	Erkat'agir		Bolorgir	Shghagir	Notrgir
Letter	Rounded	Angular	Bolorgir	Shghagir	Notrgir
Ա					
Բ					
Գ					
Դ					
Ե					
Զ					
Է					
Ը					
Թ					
Ժ					
Ի					
Լ					
Խ					
Ծ					
Կ					
Հ					
Ձ					
Ղ					
Ճ					
Մ					
Յ					
Ն					
Շ					
Ո					
Չ					
Պ					
Ջ					
Ռ					
Ս					
Վ					
Տ					
Ր					
Ց					
Ւ					
Փ					
Ք					
Օ					
Ֆ					

=== Erkat'agir ===
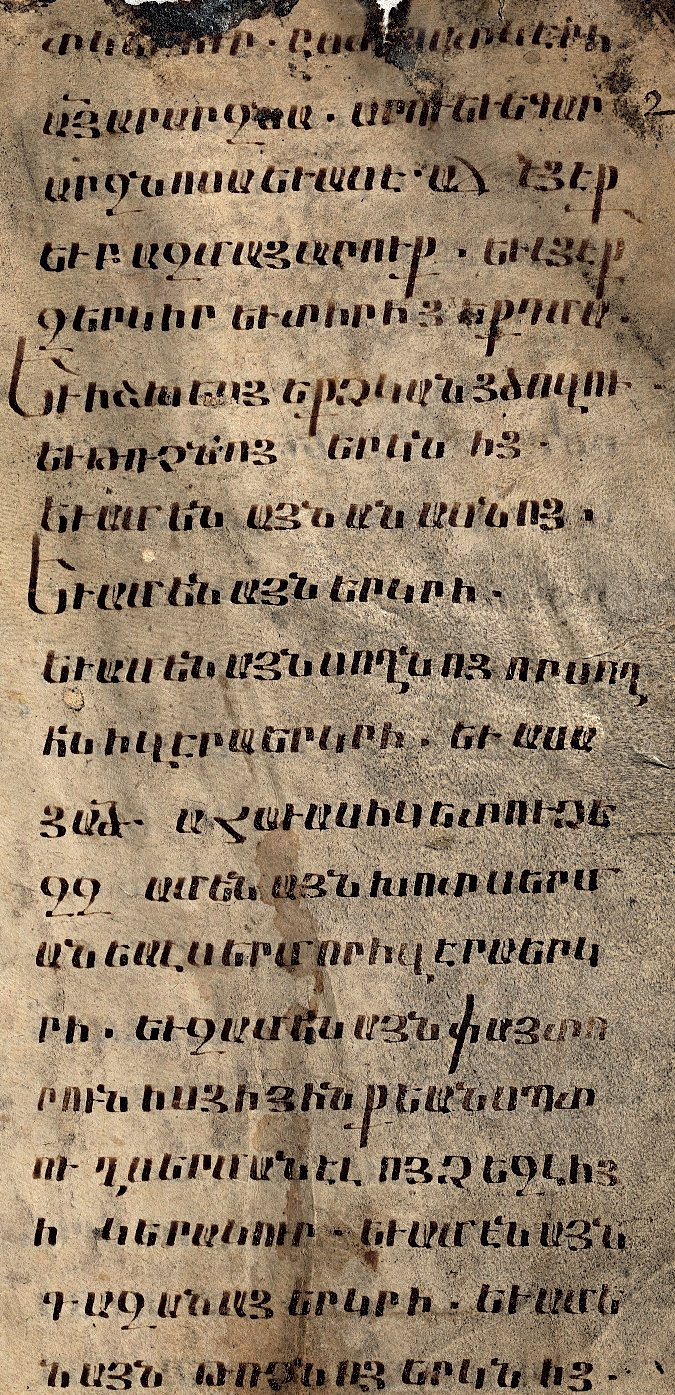
Erkatagir manuscript, 10th century

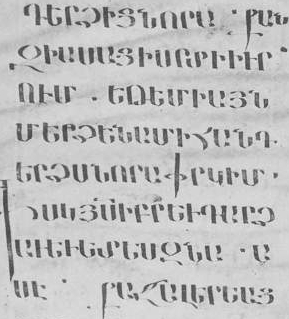
Lazar Gospel, 887. Rounded erkat'agir

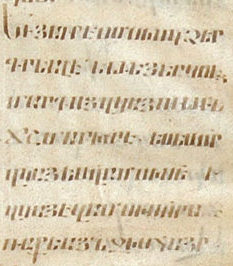
The Fourth Gospel, 11th to 12th centuries. Angular erkat'agir

Erkat'agir is the oldest of the Armenian scripts, known since the 5th century. The name is translated as "iron writing". The New Dictionary of Ancient Armenian Language (1836) gives the definition "written with an iron stylus". Another version of the etymology suggests that the name originated from the iron oxide used in the ink. More modern researchers tend to associate the term with an iron chisel used to carve the writing in stone inscriptions. In the history of Armenian writing, it is comparable to the early Latin uncial and Cyrillic scripts. The term Erkat'agir first appears in the colophon of the Gospel, dated 911. In accordance with the accepted classification of writing theory, Erkat'agir and its variants are categorised within the all caps group of scripts. The two principal forms of Old Armenian Mayuskul script are the rounded and rectilinear Erkat'agir.

Rounded Erkat'agir is formed by connecting vertical axes and connecting arcs and angles with a small number of horizontal rectilinear elements. There is no interconnection between letters and word division. The round Erkat'agir was employed until the 13th century, after which it was utilised for the purpose of titles. Even Acharyan had postulated that this was the earliest of the two species. Yuzbashyan concurred with this assessment. Stone also endorsed this interpretation. Russell considers it most probable that both species existed in the 5th century. Rounded Erkat'agir is also known as "Mesrop's own".

Another variant of this script is the angular Erkat'agir. Similarly, the variant with a rounded profile was retained until the 13th century. The earliest dated monuments are from the 10th century. It is also known as the "middle Erkat'agir", "mid-Sropovian" or semi-uncial. In this variant, arc-shaped or broken connections are replaced by rectilinear ones, and the script is drawn vertically or with a slope to the right.

In addition to the two principal types of Mayuskul script, the "small Erkat'agir" is also occasionally distinguished. In fact, it is a reduced in size rectilinear Erkat'agir. As it contains no constructive differences, the necessity of distinguishing it as an independent type of writing is open to question.

The letters were inscribed between two imaginary parallel lines, with the forming elements remaining within the confines of the line. The sole exception to this rule was the letters Փ and Ք. From the 13th century onwards, Erkat'agir was employed solely for the purpose of rendering capital letters, titles or capital lines. The practice of using the Erkat'agir script for lapidary inscriptions continued.

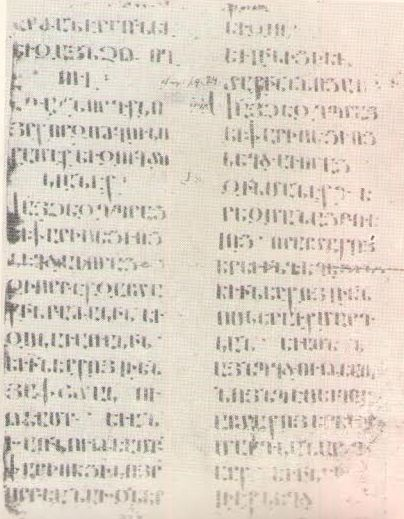
Page of a 5th-century manuscript, rounded Erkat'agir

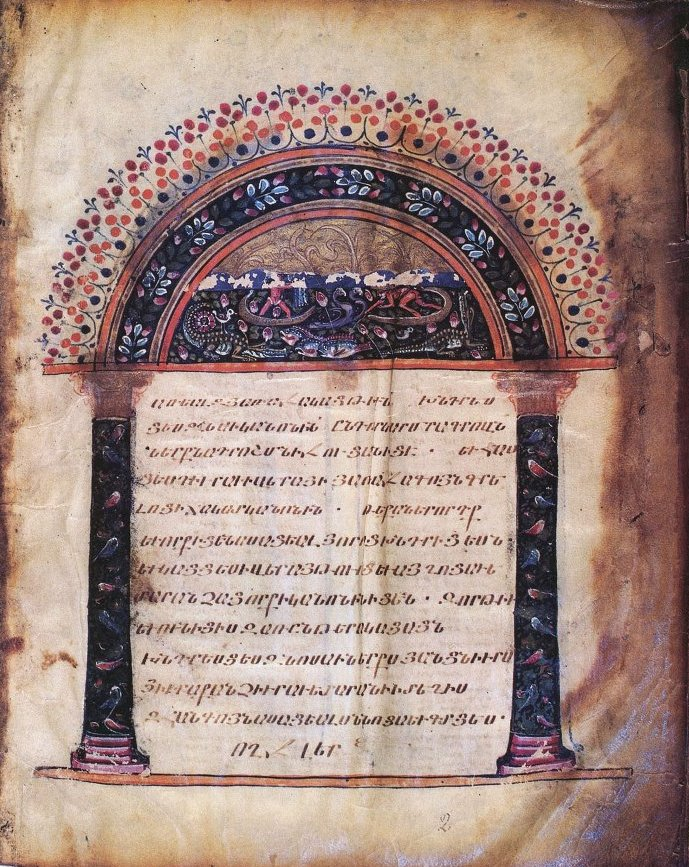
Page of Queen Mlke Gospel, rounded Erkat'agir, 862

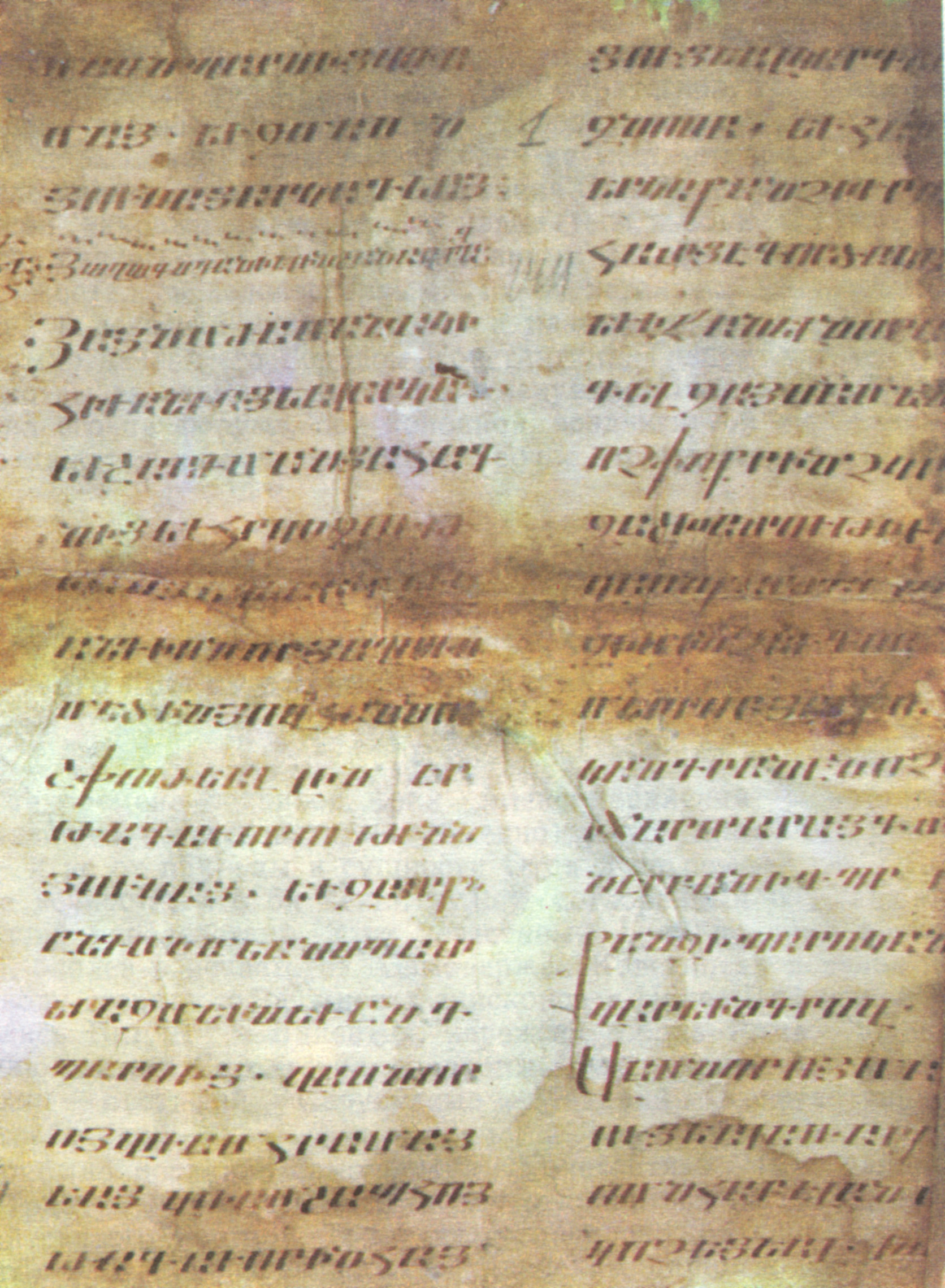
Manuscript page of Movses Khorenatsi's History of Armenia, angular Erkat'agir, 10th-11th centuries

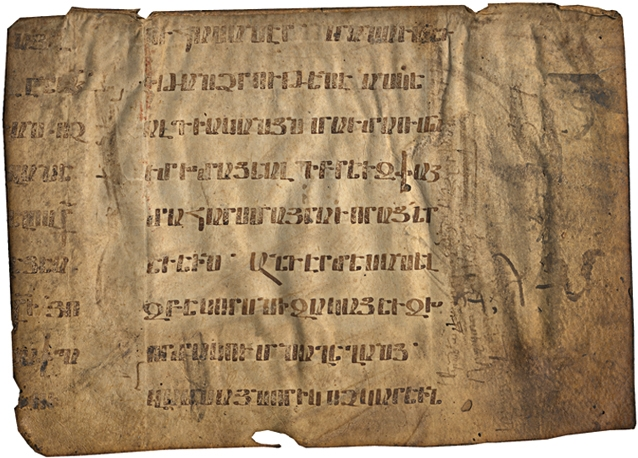
Page of manuscript History of Vardan and the Armenian War by Elishe, angular Erkat'agir, 7th to 8th centuries

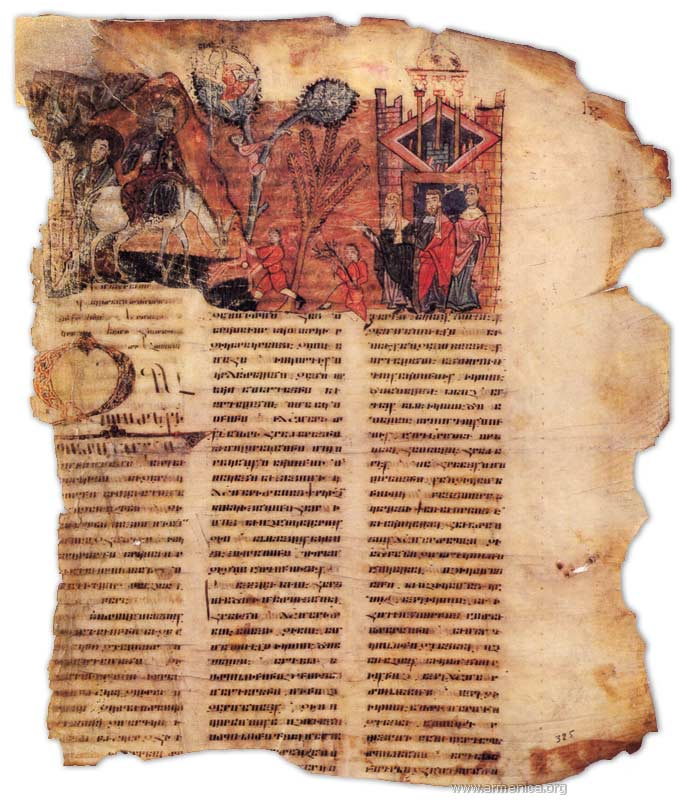
Mush homiliary, angular Erkat'agir, 1200-1202

=== Bolorgir ===
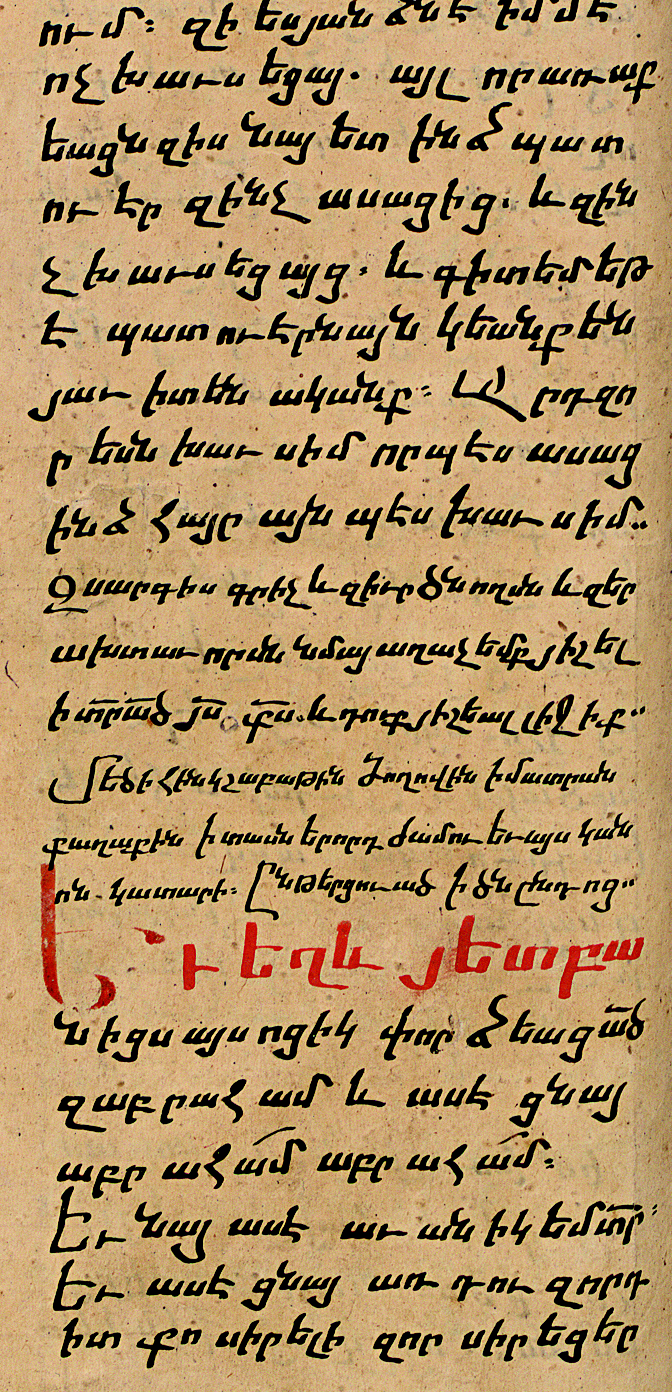
Boloragir manuscript, 14th century

The question of whether Bolorgir existed simultaneously with Erkat'agir in the 5th century or evolved from the latter has not been definitively resolved in the scientific community. The hypothesis of the simultaneous existence of Erkat'agir and Bolorghir was put forth by Hovsepyan, one of the pioneering scholars of Armenian palaeography, in the early 20th century. Sanjian also postulates that this script was in use from the 5th century onwards. Muravyov does not rule out the possibility of the original existence of ordinary cursive writing at the same time as Erkat'agir, but, based on theoretical considerations, he considers it unlikely. It is postulated that Bolorgir evolved from Erkat'agir as a consequence of the scribes' desire to economize time and parchment. Russell of Harvard University notes that Bolorgir as a type of script began to emerge in the 5th century. He further suggests that Mashtots' writing was probably originally distinct and universal.

The earliest known manuscript of this text is from the 10th century, although samples of Bolorgir can already be found in the Lazarev Gospel of 887. It is likely that this graphic form emerged even earlier, as some letters of this form are found in the Greco-Armenian papyrus of the 6th-early 7th century, as well as in a number of early Christian inscriptions of the same period. Consequently, the Greco-Armenian papyrus serves as a pivotal point of reference for the investigation of the evolution of Erkat'agir into Bolorgir. The term itself is first recorded in a colophon of the late 12th century. Bolorgir was the dominant type of writing from the 13th to the 16th century. Since the 16th century, Bolorgir has also served as the basis for the most widespread Armenian printed script. In the early 17th century, Western scholars proposed Latin equivalents for the name of this script: F. Rivola and C. Galanus proposed the term orbicularis, while I. Schröder suggested the term rotunda.

In its graphic form, it differs little from Erkat'agir and represents its reduced form. Thus, according to Koyumjan, only 16 out of 36 Armenian letters show graphic differences between the majuscule and minuscule forms, and in half of the cases these differences are insignificant. The supposed evolutionary development concerns precisely these letters. In his analysis, Stone asserts that the differences between these two types of script are either insignificant or absent altogether. He identifies a select group of nine letters with the most disparate forms, namely: Ա-ա, Ձ-ձ, Մ-մ, Յ-յ, Շ-շ, Չ-չ, Պ-պ, Ջ-ջ, Ց-ց. The majority of researchers agree that the species can be subdivided into two categories: Eastern and Cilician. Additionally, Koyumjian identifies a transitional form. The Cilician Bolorgir is more conventional and elegant, while the eastern variant is similar to the straight Erkat'agir. Bolorgir belongs to the fonts of "four-line" kind. In such a graphic inscription, the "body" of the letter is situated on the line between two imaginary parallel lines. Beyond this, bounded by another pair of imaginary lines at the top and bottom, are the outlying elements, which include arcs, tails, hooks, zigzags and others. Typically, the letters were written with a slant to the right, although on occasion there is also writing with a vertical axis. It is evident that this typeface displays a proclivity towards connection. Initially, there is a discernible distance between groups of words, and subsequently, between individual words. In contrast to the previously dominant Erkat'agir, Bolorgir was written rather than drawn.

A number of specialists translate the term as "round writing", although Bolorgir is formed by a combination of almost exclusively rectilinear elements. In Armenian, the word "bolor" means not only "round" or "rounded" but also has the meaning of "entire" or "whole", i.e. "complete".

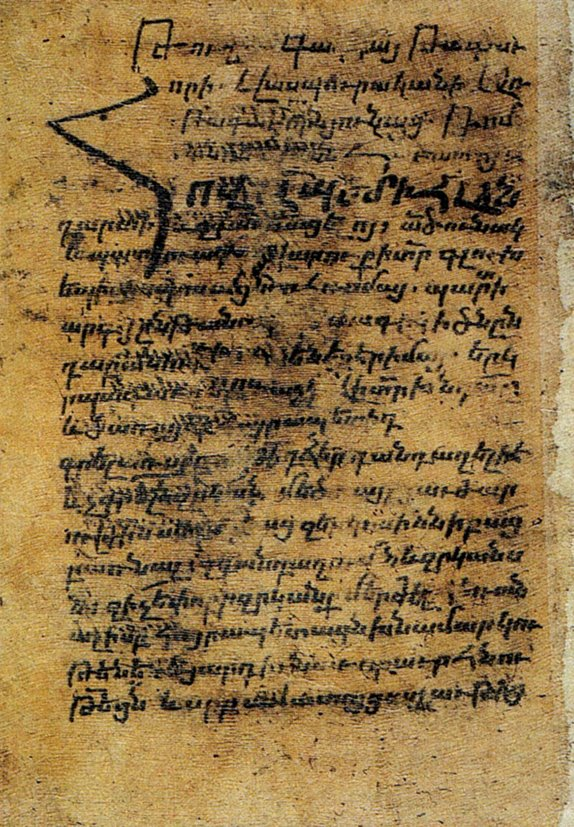
Page of a letter from King Gagik I of Vaspurakan to Romanos I Lekapenos, 14th-century manuscript (Vatican Apostolic Library)

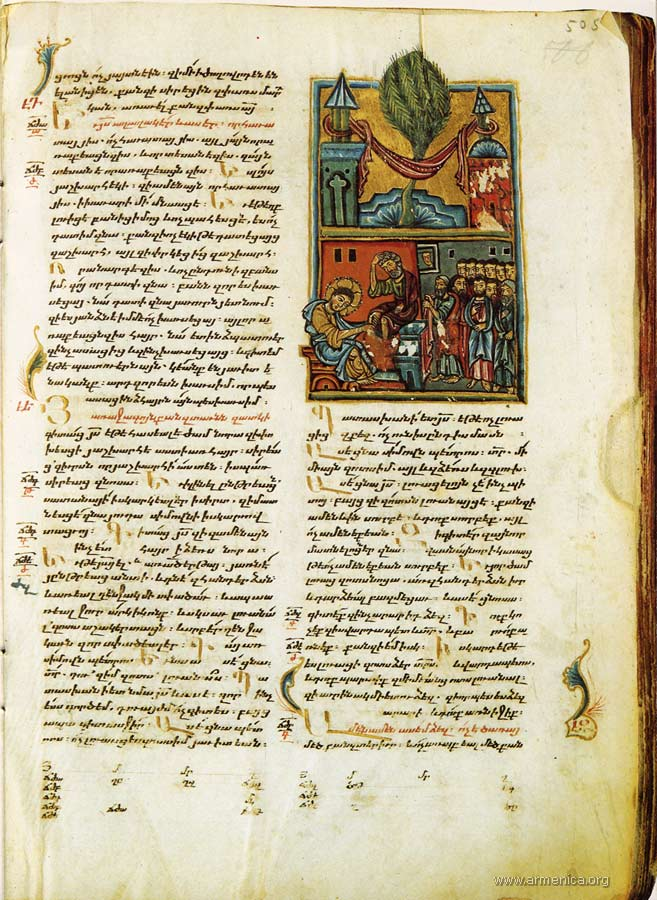
Bible page, 1318

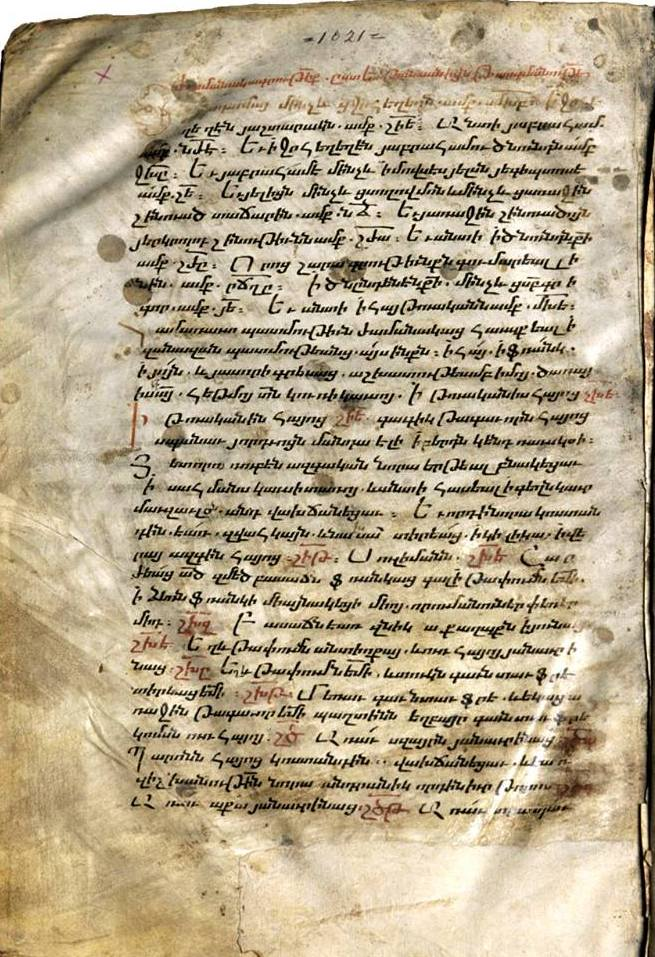
Page from Chronicle attributed to Hayton, 1319

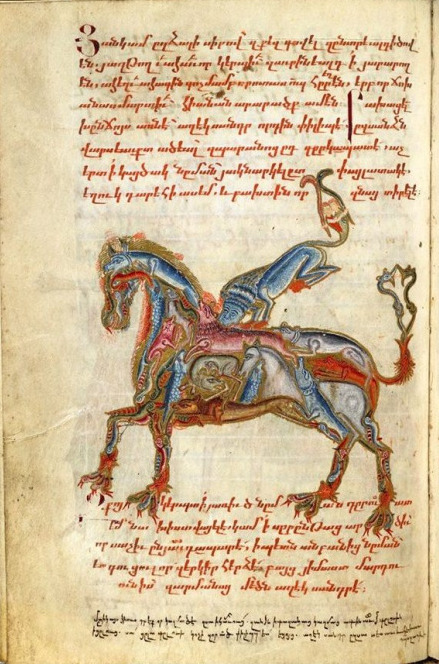
Manuscript page of the Alexander Romance, 1544

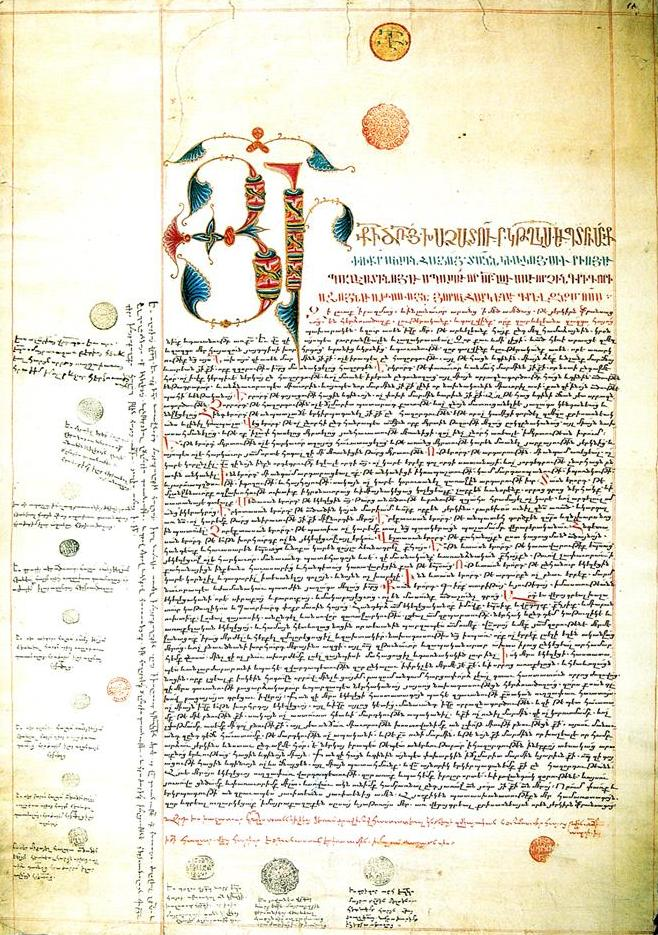
Letter from Catholicos Khachatur to Louis XIV, 1672 (Bibliothèque nationale de France)

=== Shghagir ===
Shghagir is the basis of modern skoropis. Sanjian translates the term as "slanted type". Koyumjian presents an alternative interpretation, translating the term as "thin". Shghagir is found both in straight form and with a slant. It is known to have been in use already by the 10th-11th centuries. The earliest known example of this script is dated 999. Furthermore, there are similarities between some forms of Greek-Armenian papyrus script and Shghagir. Its prevalence was relatively limited to the 17th and 18th centuries, with its most common usage being in memorial records. The font is characterised by a combination of rectilinear, broken and rounded elements. One of the most notable characteristics of this font is that all its elements were written in a single, uniform thickness. The term itself appears to have first appeared in the 18th century. Typically, it is not divided into distinct categories.

=== Notrgir ===
Notrgir translates to "notarized letter". It is commonly accepted that the Nothirgic form of writing was established in the 13th century, with the earliest surviving examples dating back to the 14th century. According to Stone, the term itself was first recorded in the 15th century, but became more widespread in the 16th to 18th centuries, particularly among the Armenian diaspora. Subsequently, it also became a popular script in print. This font is smaller than Bolorgir and is formed by combining rectilinear, rounded and wavy elements. The utilisation of cursive forms of Notrgir was employed as a means of conserving writing materials. It incorporates elements of both Bolorgir and Shghagir. Notrgir was employed primarily for the transcription of informal texts, including colophons of manuscripts and clerical documents. Similarly to Shghagir, it is not subdivided types.

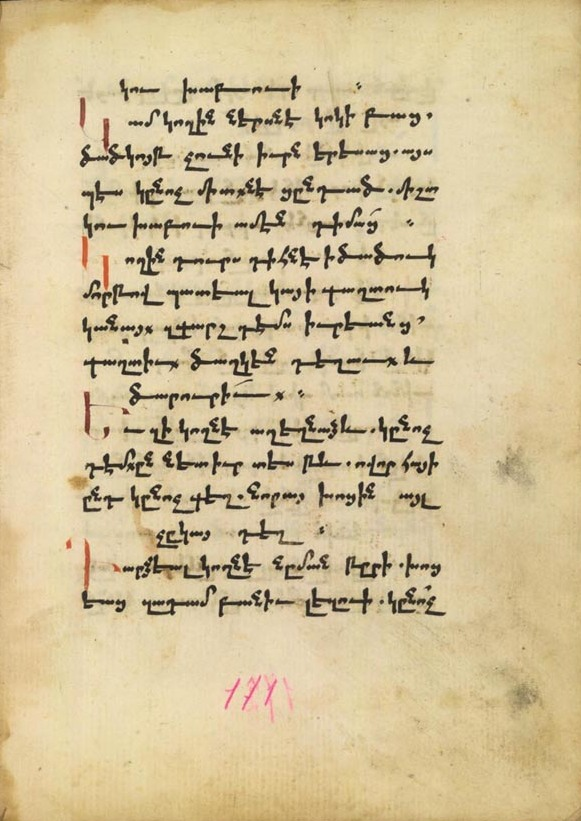
Manuscript page of the poem Adamgirk by Arakel Syunetsi, 1653

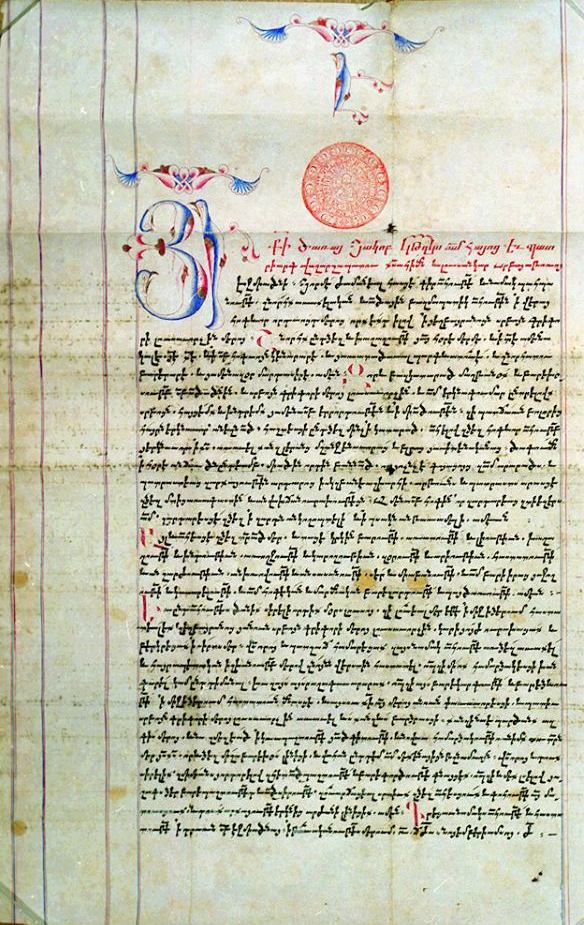
Document of Catholicos Hakob Jughayetsi addressed to the Polish Armenian diocese, 1662

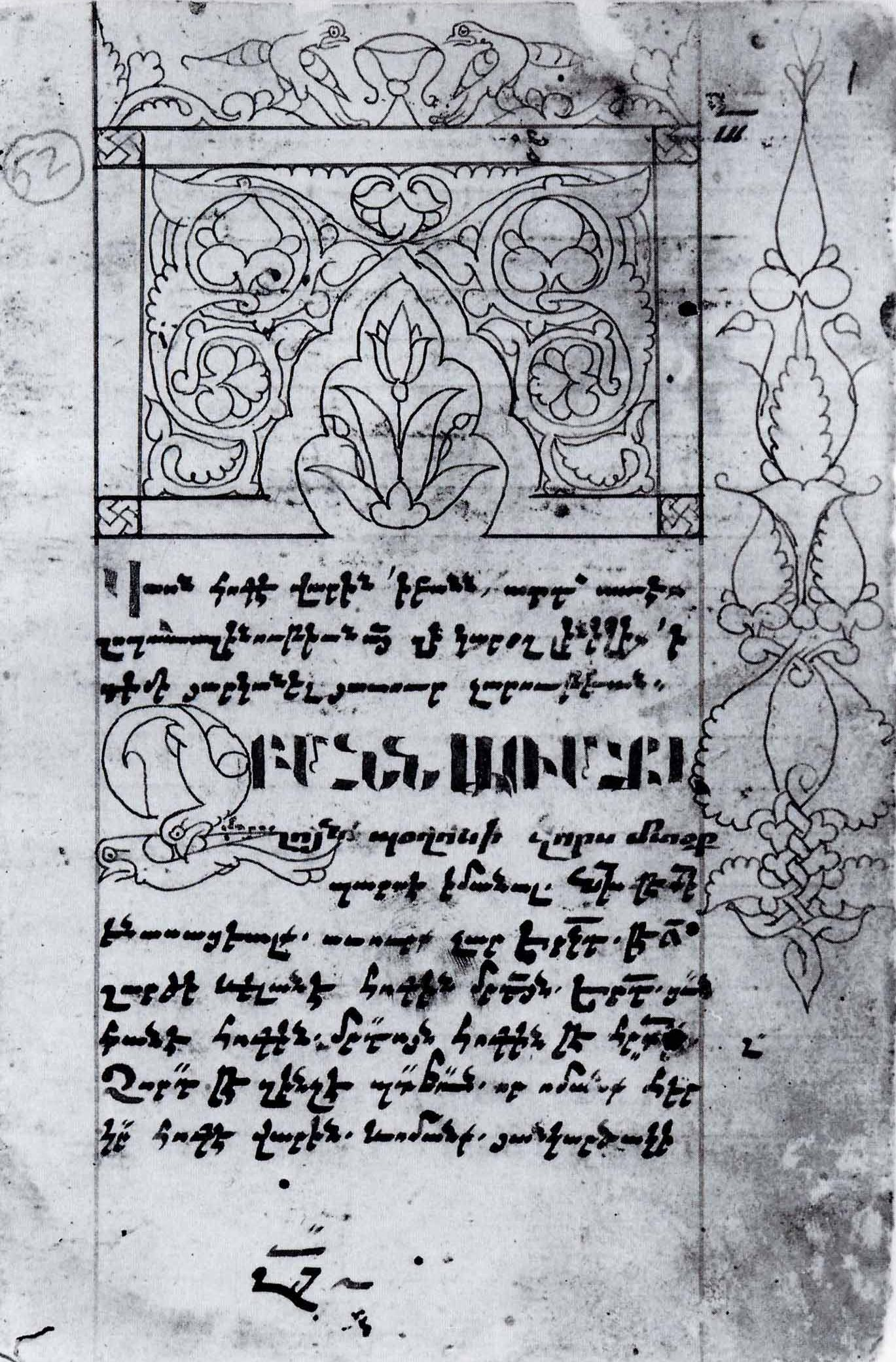
A page from a collection of homilies, 1710

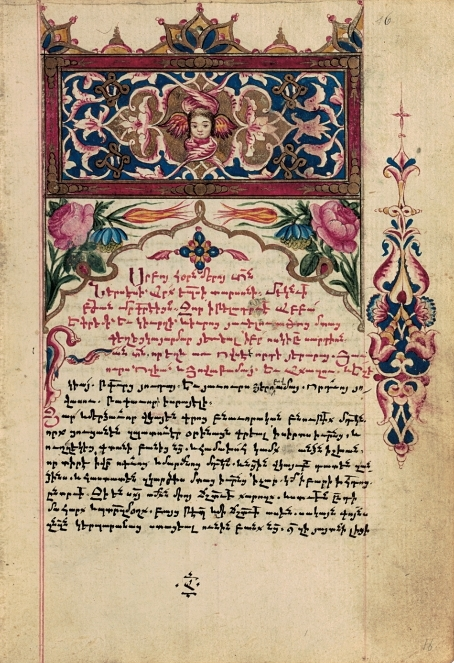
Page of an 18th-century manuscript

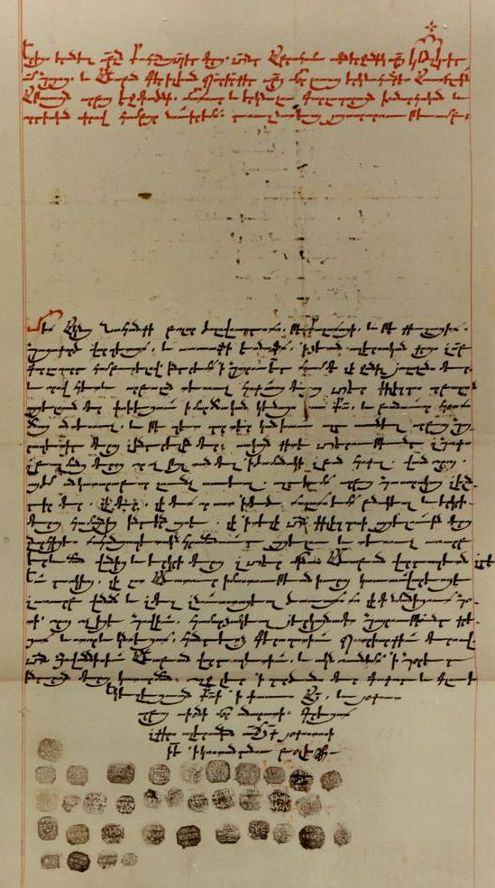
Document from 1734

== Bibliography ==
in Armenian

- Абрамян, А. (1948). Армянская палеография [Armenian palaeography]. Yerevan.
- Абрамян, А. (1959). История армянского письма и письменности [History of Armenian writing and script]. Yerevan.
- Аветикян, Г.; Сюрмелян, Х.; Авгерян, М. (1836). Новый словарь древнеармянского языка [New Dictionary of Ancient Armenian]. Vol. I. Venice.
- Acharian, Hrachia (1952). "Армянская рукопись V века" [Armenian manuscript of the 5th century] (PDF). Вестник общественных наук (11): 69–77. Archived from the original (PDF) on 2020-07-13.
- Давтян, Г. (1980). "Рукопись" [Manuscript]. Armenian Soviet Encyclopedia. 6. Yerevan: 695.
- Кафадарян, Г.К. (1962). "Надпись Текорского храма V века и армянский алфавит с месроповским письмом" [5th century inscription of the Tekor temple and the Armenian alphabet with the Mesropov script]. Историко-филологический журнал (2): 39–54.
- Манукян, С. (2002). "Рукописный кодекс" [Manuscript Codex] (PDF). In Айвазян, О.М. (ed.). Христианская Армения: Энциклопедия [Christian Armenia: Encyclopaedia]. Yerevan. pp. 648–651.
- Матевосян, А.С. (1976). "Две ценные рукописи Матенадарану им. Месропа Маштоца" [Two valuable manuscripts to the Matenadaran named after Mesrop Mashtots] (PDF). Ejmiatsin (12). Ejmiatsin: 45–51.
- Матевосян, А.С. (1973). "Древнейшая рукопись Лазаревского института" [The oldest manuscript of the Lazarev Institute]. Историко-филологический журнал (1): 123–132 – via Pan-Armenian Digital Library.
- Матевосян, А. (1982). "Нотргир" [Notrgir]. Armenian Soviet Encyclopedia. 8. Yerevan: 348–349.
- Матевосян, А. (1982). "Шхагир" [Shghagir]. Armenian Soviet Encyclopedia. 8. Yerevan: 523.
- Овсепян, Г. (1913). Искусство письма у древних армян [The art of writing of ancient Armenians]. Vagharshapat.
- Петросян, Г.; Алексанян, В. (1980). "Палеография" [Palaeography]. Armenian Soviet Encyclopedia. 6. Yerevan: 462.
- Stone, M. (1993). "Новонайденные армянские надписи из Иерусалима" [Newly discovered Armenian inscriptions from Jerusalem] (PDF). Историко-филологический журнал (1–2): 15–26. Archived from the original (PDF) on 2015-05-26.
- Ташян, Я. (1898). Обзор армянской палеографии [An overview of Armenian palaeography]. Vienna: изд-во Мхитаристов. p. 203.
- Yuzbashyan, Karen (1959). "А. Г. Абрамян, «История армянского письма и письменности», Ереван, Айпетрат, 1959, стр. 415" [А. G. Abrahamyan, "History of Armenian writing and script", Yerevan, Haypetrat, 1959, p. 415] (PDF). Вестник общественных наук (11–12): 115–124. Archived from the original (PDF) on 2015-05-24.

in Russian

- Manukyan, S. S. (2001). "Армения: Искусство рукописной книги" [Armenia: The Art of the Handwritten Book]. Orthodox Encyclopedia. Vol. 3. pp. 286–322.
- Белявский, А.; Лазаревич, Л.; Монгайт, А., eds. (1956). "Армения в III — IV вв." [Armenia in the 3rd-4th centuries.]. Всемирная история [World History]. Vol. 2. Moscow.
- Gamkrelidze, Tamaz V. (1988). "Происхождение и типология алфавитной системы письма (Письменные системы раннехристианской эпохи)" [Origins and typology of the alphabetic writing system (Written systems of the early Christian era)] (PDF). Topics in the Study of Language (FTP). Moscow. pp. 5–33. (To view documents see Help:FTP)
- Gamkrelidze, Tamaz V. (1989). "Древнеармянская письменность «Еркатагир»" [The ancient Armenian script "Erkat'agir"]. Алфавитное письмо и древнегрузинская письменность: типология и происхождение алфавитных систем письма [Alphabetic writing and ancient Georgian script: typology and origin of alphabetic writing systems]. Edited and prefaced by A. G. Shanidze. Tbilisi: Tbilisi State University. pp. 245–252.
- Деврикян, В. (2006). "Давтак Кертог" [Davtak Kertog]. Orthodox Encyclopedia. 13. Moscow: 612.
- Jahukyan, Gevorg (1981). "Языкознание в Армении в V—XVIII вв." [Linguistics in Armenia in the V-XVIII centuries.] (PDF). In Десницкая, А.В.; Кацнельсон, С.Д. (eds.). История лингвистических учений [History of linguistic studies]. Leningrad: Nauka. pp. 7–52. Archived from the original (PDF) on 2013-10-23.
- Евангелие в древне-армянском переводе, написанное в 887 году. Фототипическое издание рукописи Лазаревскаго института восточных языков на иждивение почетнаго попечителя института князя С.С. Абамелек-Лазарева [The Gospel in Ancient Armenian translation, written in 887. Phototypical edition of the manuscript of the Lazarev Institute of Oriental Languages at the dependence of Prince S.S. Abamelek-Lazarev, Honorary Trustee of the Institute]. Moscow. 1899.
- Князевская, О.А.; Крюков, М.В. (1968). Сурков, А.А. (ed.). Палеография [Palaeography]. Vol. 5 (Concise Literary Encyclopedia ed.). Moscow: Soviet Encyclopedia. pp. 545–551.
- Муравьёв, С.Н. (1980). "О протосистеме армянского алфавита" [On the protosystem of the Armenian alphabet]. Историко-филологический журнал (2): 221–240.
- Ольдерогге, Д.А. (1975). "Из истории армяно-эфиопских связей (алфавит Маштоца)" [From the history of Armenian-Ethiopian relations (Mashtots alphabet)] (PDF). Древний Восток (1). Moscow: Nauka: 208–218.
- "Палеография" [Palaeography]. Great Soviet Encyclopedia. Moscow. 1975.
- Perikhanian, Anahit (1966). "К вопросу о происхождении армянской письменности" [On the origin of the Armenian written language]. Переднеазиатский сборник: II. Дешифровка и интерпретация письменности Древнего Востока. Moscow.
- Сусов, И.П. (2006). "4.5. Формирование лингвистической мысли в Армении" [4.5 Formation of linguistic thought in Armenia]. История языкознания [History of linguistics]. Moscow.
- Туманян, Э.Г. (1990). "Армянское письмо" [Armenian writing]. Лингвистический энциклопедический словарь. Moscow: Soviet Encyclopedia.
- Хуршудян, Э.; Акопян, Н. (1999). "Сасанидский золотой перстень с геммой на древнеармянском (V—VII вв.)" [Sassanid gold ring with a gem in Old Armenian (5th-7th centuries)]. Страны и народы Ближнего Среднего Востока. 18. Зангак-97: 182–187.
- Yuzbashyan, Karen (1987). "Армянские рукописи" [Armenian manuscripts] (PDF). Рукописная книга в культуре народов Востока [Manuscript book in the culture of the peoples of the East]. Vol. Book one. Moscow: Nauka. pp. 145–176.
- Yuzbashyan, Karen (2005). "Армянские рукописи в петербургских собраниях. Каталог" [Armenian manuscripts in St Petersburg collections. Catalogue] (PDF). Православный Палестинский сборник. 41 (104). Saint Petersburg: Дмитрий Буланин: 3–16.
- Yuzbashyan, Karen (1982). "Новая попытка истолковать происхождение армянского алфавита: открытие или заблуждение?" [A new attempt to interpret the origin of the Armenian alphabet: discovery or misconception?] (PDF). Историко-филологический журнал (1): 177–184.

in English

- Calzolari, Valentina; Stone, Michael E. (2014). Armenian Philology in the Modern Era: From Manuscript to Digital Text. Leiden: Koninklijke Brill. ISBN 978-90-04-27096-1.
- Christin, Anne-Marie (2002). A History of Writing: From Hieroglyph to Multimedia. Flammarion. pp. 258–260.
- Daniels, Peter T.; Bright, William (1996). The World's Writing Systems. Oxford University Press. ISBN 978-0-19-507993-7.
- Kouymjian, D. (1997). "Armenian paleography: a reassessment" (PDF). Scribes et Manuscrits du Moyen-Orient. Paris: Bibliothèque nationale de France: 177–188. Archived from the original (PDF) on 2023-12-10.
- Kouymjian, D. (2012). "Notes on Armenian Codicology. Part 1: Statistics Based on Surveys of Armenian Manuscripts". Comparative Oriental Manuscript Studies Newsletter (4): 18–23.
- Kouymjian, D. (2013). "Notes on Armenian Codicology. Part 2: Statistics Based on Surveys of Armenian Manuscripts" (PDF). Comparative Oriental Manuscript Studies Newsletter (6): 22–28. Archived from the original (PDF) on 2015-05-22.
- Russell, J.R. (2006). "Review of Michael E. Stone, Dickran Kouymjian, and Henning Lehmann 'Album of Armenian Paleography'". Speculum. 81 (1). N. Y.: University of Chicago Press: 278–279. doi:10.1017/S0038713400020285. Archived from the original on 2015-09-14.
- Sanjian, A.K. (1999). Medieval Armenian Manuscripts at the University of California, Los Angeles. Berkley: University of California Press. ISBN 978-0-520-09792-6.
- Stone, Michael E.; Kouymjian, Dickran; Lehmann, Henning (2002). Album of Armenian Paleography. Aarhus: Aarhus University Press. ISBN 978-87-7288-556-8.
- Stone, Michael E. (2006). Apocrypha, Pseudepigrapha, and Armenian Studies. Vol. II. Leuven: Peeters Publishers. ISBN 978-90-429-1644-9.
- Stone, Michael E. (2012). Armenian Apocrypha Relating to Abraham. Early Judaism and its literature, 37. Society of Biblical Lit. ISBN 978-1-58983-716-4.
- "History of Transcaucasia / Armenia". Encyclopedia Britannica. 27 May 2024.
- "Armenian alphabet". Encyclopedia Britannica.

in Latin

- Schröder, J.J. (1711). Thesaurus linguae Armenicae, antiquae et hodiernae. Amsterdam.
