= Aramashot Papayan =

Soviet-Armenian playwright (1911–1998)

- Born: Ashot Papayan; 15 September 1911; Batumi, Adjara
- Died: 26 November 1998 (aged 87); Yerevan, Armenia
- Resting place: Tokhmakh
- Occupations: Actor, playwright, screenwriter and director
- Writing career
- Genre: primarily comedies

Aramashot Papayan (Armenian: Արամաշոտ Պապայան; September 15, 1911 – November 26, 1998) was a Soviet Armenian playwright, screenwriter, actor and director. Originally named Ashot, he changed his name to Aramashot upon the death of his nephew Aram Papayan in memory.

== Early life ==
Papayan was born as Ashot Papayan on September 15, 1911 in Batumi, Adjara. His parents, Grap and Petros, fled from Bitlis during the massacres of the Armenian population in the Ottoman Empire, which preceded the Armenian genocide. His aunt married a Pasha, who saved her life and allowed her to resettle elsewhere. Many of his extended family was killed during the genocide.

At the age of fifteen, Papayan's father Petros and uncle Hyrapet both died, leaving him to be the main source of income for his family. Papayan did hard labor at the start of his life to support his immediate and extended family. He took on the responsibility of several different jobs such as a cobbler, a gatherer at a tea plantation, a construction worker and a cargo transporter. His difficult childhood played an instrumental role in his love for comedic playwriting. He felt that through laughter one can overcome the darkest moments in life. Papayan once said, "Optimistic, healthy laughter enthuses me. My preference for laughter comes from those living, natural and lively sources, from that native cauldron that gives shape to natural temperament."

In 1933 Papayan married Yeva Papazyan, a well educated woman from Sukhumi, whom he had four children with: Emma, Rafael, Seda and Aram.

=== Education ===
Papayan graduated from the Shahumian School of Batumi in 1926. In 1930 he studied at the Rostov-on-Don Pedagogical Institute. In 1947–1949 he studied at Yerevan University and later graduated from Moscow's Maxim Gorki Institute of Literature in 1951.

== Career ==
=== Acting ===
Papayan began his theatrical career by acting in small unprofessional roles, but his career grew as he began taking his work seriously. During his apprenticeship at the Armenian State Theatre of the Northern Caucasus, he became the lead actor. In 1930, he, and a few theatre lovers, reinstated the Rostov-on-Don Armenian dramatic theatre. They invited the Armenian director Arshak Burjalyan to help them reinstate the Rostov-on-Don theatre. He stayed for two seasons and dramatically improved the theatre. They also invited the Armenian actor Hovhannes Abelyan, who encouraged Papayan in his career. Papayan's first large role was the character President Von Walter in the play "Intrigue and Love" by Friedrich von Schiller. He soon gained recognition as an extraordinary talent who had a gift for acting. He began to gain more fame and recognition with his roles of the characters Othello in William Shakespeare's Othello and Brother Balthazer in Hakob Paronyan's "Brother Balthazar." During this time he would work with other famous Armenian actors such as Martin Lucinyan, Hayk and Isabella Danzas. At this time he also gained support from the famous director A. Bouzchahian. Papayan's success opened doors for him and his colleagues at the Rostov-on-Don theatre to be able to perform in other cities.

Papayan also worked at the Kirovakan and Echmiadzin theatres.

=== Playwrighting ===
Papayan soon transitioned from acting to writing and staging plays. Of the transition he said, “Although my artistic career as a theatrical artist remained incomplete, you can say that it gave me an important experience for my playwriting career.” Through acting he was able to become familiar with plays and the designs of the set. He was able to see the inner workings of the theatre as well as its schedule. All of this led him to understand and know what the audience expected. In 1935, Papayan briefly dabbled into directing at the Batumi Armenian theatre, where he directed the comedy “The Bridal Auction.” He also worked at the Armenian Theatre of Krasnadar, staging the play “The Brother” and “Blind Musician” by M. Khochanyan. He then went on to work at the Ashtarak Theatre in the 1940s, helping it gain success.

His nephew, Aram Papayan, often worked with him on these projects, but Aram Papayan's main occupation was a journalist at the "Stalinets" newspaper.

Ashot Papayan's career was interrupted by his service in the Great Patriotic War. He served in a military college in Baku, Azerbaijan. His nephew served as a deputy editor of the "Zashchitnik Otechestva" newspaper, as well as the "Communist" newspaper. He also worked in the commissariat of Yerevan. In 1945, Papayan and Aram reunited, co-writing and staging the play, "The Great Wedding." They had also co-written the plays "Love without Intrigue" and "Lucky Ones," but the play "The Great Wedding," shot both of them to stardom. The operetta of the play was composed by the famous musician Vardan Tigranyan. Soon after the war ended and "The Great Wedding" met great success, Aram Papayan was killed in an automobile accident. Devastated, Ashot Papayan combined his birth name with his nephew's name. Since then he was referred to as Aramashot Papayan. Years later, in 1970, Paruyr Sevak wrote a tribute article to the late Aram Papayan in the Soviet "Literature Newspaper" titled, "The Dead Don’t Age.”

An excerpt of the article states, "Later, a very emotional resurrection took place. There was Ashot Papayan and there was Aram Papayan. They signed their plays as Ashot And Aram Papayan’s, together. The capital And disappeared and the Soviet Armenian genre of playwriting gained a new name. Aramashot appeared while erasing the And. The younger came first while the older went last. By doing this, Aramashot, one of the most famous playwrights of our day, immortalized the memory of his younger brother. But brothers aren’t only by blood, in certain instances, there are also brothers by pen. Like one of them, I bow my head before the tombstone of my prematurely dead brother by pen."

Papayan was a member of the USSR Writers Union since 1944. He was elected to the board of the Writers Union in 1971 along with Sergo Payazat, Abig Avagyan, Paruyr Sevak, Sero Khanzadyan, Hamo Sahyan and Hrachya Hovhannisyan.

Some of his most famous works were "The Great Wedding," “The World, Yes, has Turned Upside Down," "The Overseas Fiancé" and "Be Nice, I'm Dead.”

According to Armenia's theatrical statistics, his play "The World, Yes, has Turned Upside Down" was one of the most staged plays in the history of the Armenian Theatre.

Papayan's plays have been staged in Russia, Ukraine, Azerbaijan, Egypt, Georgia, Turkmenistan, Syria, Moldova, Nagorno-Karabakh, Lebanon, Cyprus, Bulgaria, Belarus, the United States, England and France.

Armenian Actors and Directors Who Have Worked on Papayan's Plays

- Vardan Ajemyan (directed) – The World Yes, Has Turned Upside Down
- Gurgen Janibekyan (acted) – The World, Yes, Has Turned Upside Down
- Arus Asryan (acted) – The World, Yes, Has Turned Upside Down
- Sos Sargsyan (acted) – The World, Yes, Has Turned Upside Down
- Edgar Elbakyan (acted) – The World, Yes, Has Turned Upside Down
- Armen Khostikyan (acted) – The World, Yes, Has Turned Upside Down
- Donara Mkrtchyan (acted) – The World, Yes, Has Turned Upside Down
- Zhenya Avetisyan (acted) – The World, Yes, Has Turned Upside Down
- Yervand Ghazanchyan (directed) – Be Nice, I’m Dead (Gna Meri Ari Sirem)
- Tigranuhi Ter-Markosyan (acted) – Be Nice, I’m Dead (Gna Meri Ari Sirem)
- Vigen Stepanyan (acted) – Welcome to the birth of Hakob Nshanich
- Yvetta Baburyan (acted) – Welcome to the birth if Hakob Nshanich
- Zhenya Nersisyan (acted) – Welcome to the Birthday of Hakob Nshanich
- Vahram Yeghsatyan (acted) – Welcome to the Birthday of Hakob Nshanich
- Rafael Kotanjyan (acted) – Welcome to the birth of Hakon Nshanich
- Nishan Parlakian (directed/translated) – Be Nice, I’m Dead. Nishan Parlakian's translation of Be Nice, I’m Dead, is the first ever contemporary Armenian play to be translated into English.

== Later life ==
In 1982, his son Rafael Papayan, a philologist who studied under Juri Lotman and co-founded the Armenian Helsinki Foundation of Human Rights, was arrested and taken to a maximum security prison camp. He was accused of anti-soviet propaganda and agitation. He was sentenced to four years in a Mordovia prison and two years in exile. His sentence was cut short due to Gorbachev’s reforms. He went on to be a judge on the Constitutional Court of Armenia.

Aramashot Papayan became one of the most staged playwrights in the Soviet Union during the 20th century. Of his success director Vardan Ajemian said, "There are two reasons for his success. He deeply recognizes the spirit of the audience and he has the nerve for theatre."

Towards the end of his life he began writing memoirs, which remained incomplete and unpublished. They are currently being held in the archive of the Charents Museum of Literature and Arts.

Papayan died in Yerevan, Armenia on November 26, 1998. He was 87 years old.

== Works ==
Staged Plays

- Dream – 1936 drama
- Our Fight is Fair – 1941
- Rise – 1943
- The Great Wedding – 1944
- Stunning Strike – 1956
- The Tireless Groom – 1956
- The Living Dead – 1963
- Welcome to the Birthday of Hakob Nshanich – 1965
- The World, Yes, Has Turned Upside Down – 1967
- The Overseas Fiancé – 1972
- Be Nice, I’m Dead (Gna Meri Ari Sirem)

Written Plays

- Dream – 1936 drama
- Lucky Ones
- Love without Intrigue
- Our Fight is Fair – 1941
- Rise – 1943
- The Great Wedding – 1944
- Stunning Strike – 1956
- The Tireless Groom – 1956
- The Living Dead – 1963
- Welcome to the Birthday of Hakob Nshanich – 1965
- The World, Yes, Has Turned Upside Down – 1967
- The Overseas Fiancé – 1972
- Be Nice I’m Dead (Gna Meri Ari Sirem)
- The Roses of Yerevan
- The Things Satan Will Do When God is Asleep
- April 1
- Oh my Kyufta
- Christening
- Things Like That Happen Too
- Trouble from Jealousy
- Things are Frantic at Master Margari's Home
- Wedding at the Doorstep of Death
- Validating the Groom
- Manruk
- Heart in a Trap
- How Many Smiles are Around Me
- I Want a Homeland

Filmography

- David Bek 1943 – Actor
- Manrunk (Trifle) 1954 – Screenwriter
- Visiting the Groom/ The Bride 1954 (short) – Screenwriter
- About My Friend 1958 – Screenwriter
- Meeting at the Exhibition 1968 – Actor
- The World, Yes, Has Turned Upside Down – Playwright
- Welcome to the Birthday of Hakob – Playwright

Published Books

- Collection of plays (Ashot Papayan's play "Lucky" by Aram Papayan is included in the book), Yerevan, Kultlushrat, 1950, 116 pages.
- Stunning blow, Yerevan, 1955, 39 pages.
- The Great Wedding, Yerevan, 1960, 115 pages.
- Comedies, Yerevan, 1962, 450 pages.
- Laughter, Yerevan, 1965, 396 pages.
- The world, yes, has turned upside down, Yerevan, "Armenia", 1968, 112 pages.
- The world, yes, has turned upside down, Yerevan, "Armenia", 1972, 449 pages.
- The Overseas fiancé. A collection of plays. Soviet writer, 1982, 408 pages.
- Be Nice, I’m Dead, United States, 1990, 118 pages.

== Awards ==
- Order of Friendship of Peoples (14.09.1981)
- "Badge of Honor" medal
- Honored Art Worker of the USSR (1975)
