= Renewable energy in Armenia =

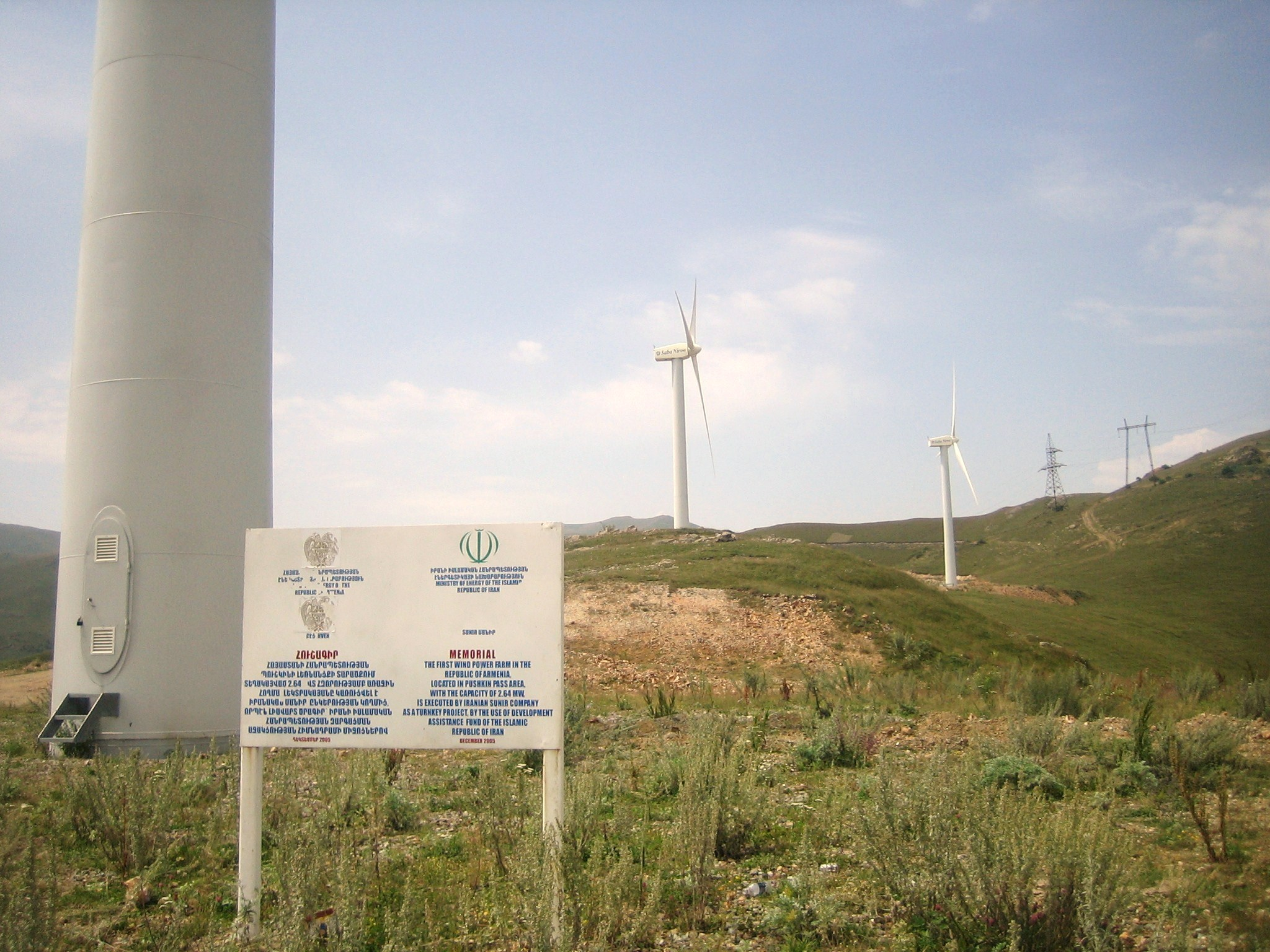
Lori 1 Wind Farm in Lori Province

Renewable energy in Armenia ranges from geothermal, hydroelectric, solar and wind energy in Armenia.

== Development ==
The European Union has supported Armenia's transition to sustainable energy through various initiatives and grants. In 2019, the former Head of the EU Delegation to Armenia, Andrea Wiktorin stated: "Armenia is moving forward on its sustainable energy pathway, with strong support from the European Union."

According to the International Energy Agency, imports of oil and gas continue to cover 75% of Armenia's energy needs. However, the Government of Armenia has focused it's energy policy towards developing indigenous energy sources, mainly renewable, and on replacing the country's main nuclear reactor.

Meanwhile, energy efficiency policy has also become a bigger priority as energy security and reliability remain key focus areas of the government. Armenia is part of the EU4Energy Programme, which provides the six countries of the Eastern Partnership with the necessary tools for effective evidence-based policy design and shaping policy in such sectors as energy security, sustainable energy and energy markets.

== Sources ==
=== Geothermal ===
Armenia is constructing the Jermaghbyur Geothermal Power Plant which will be the country's largest geothermal power plant having an installed electric capacity of 150 MW.

As of 2018, the Ministry of Energy and Natural Resources of Armenia is considering the development of a geothermal plant on the Jermaghbyur and Karkar sites in a package solution with a single investor.

An $8.55M grant was awarded by the World Bank in 2015 for further exploration of geothermal resources in Armenia.

Reconnaissance drilling for Armenia's first geothermal power plant in Jermaghbyur (Jermaghbyur Geothermal Power Plant) was conducted in 2016. The drilling works of the first wells with the depth of 1500m and the second well of 1682m have been completed. The total cost of the geothermal power plant construction project at Karkar site is expected to make about $100 million. Karkar geothermal power plant with a capacity of 30 MW will generate around 250 million kWh of electricity in a year.

A high pressure (20-25 atmosphere pressure) hot water (up to 250 °C) considered to be available in depth of 2500–3000 meters in Jermaghbyur is a potential source of geothermal energy with a capacity of 25 MW.

=== Bioenergy ===
The bioenergy sphere is gradually developing in Armenia. There are three rudimentary branches of bio energy: biofuel, biomass and biogas. Many scientists see the future of renewable energy of Armenia in bio energy.

The first is biofuel. As is accepted worldwide, the substantial sources of bio-ethanol are maize and sugarcane. Through these ingredients, bio ethanol is generated. Even in the case of blending it 50–50 with oil, the price will be cheaper than in ordinary cases. Thus, prices for transportation will decrease as well. The weather in Armenia is not appropriate for growing sugarcane, so the Jerusalem artichoke is considered to replace it. Moreover, its high concentration of carbohydrates makes it a better source for bio-ethanol production. Another type of cheap biofuel is created by compressing straw, sawdust, and the pods of sunflowers in a crusher into granules, which are then burned. It is feasible to receive 2 cubic meters (m^{3}) of gas from the burning of 1 kilogram (kg) of those granules. Scientists believe this will give Armenia the opportunity to provide heat for houses and to produce electricity, which would not be dependent on gas pipes or oil.

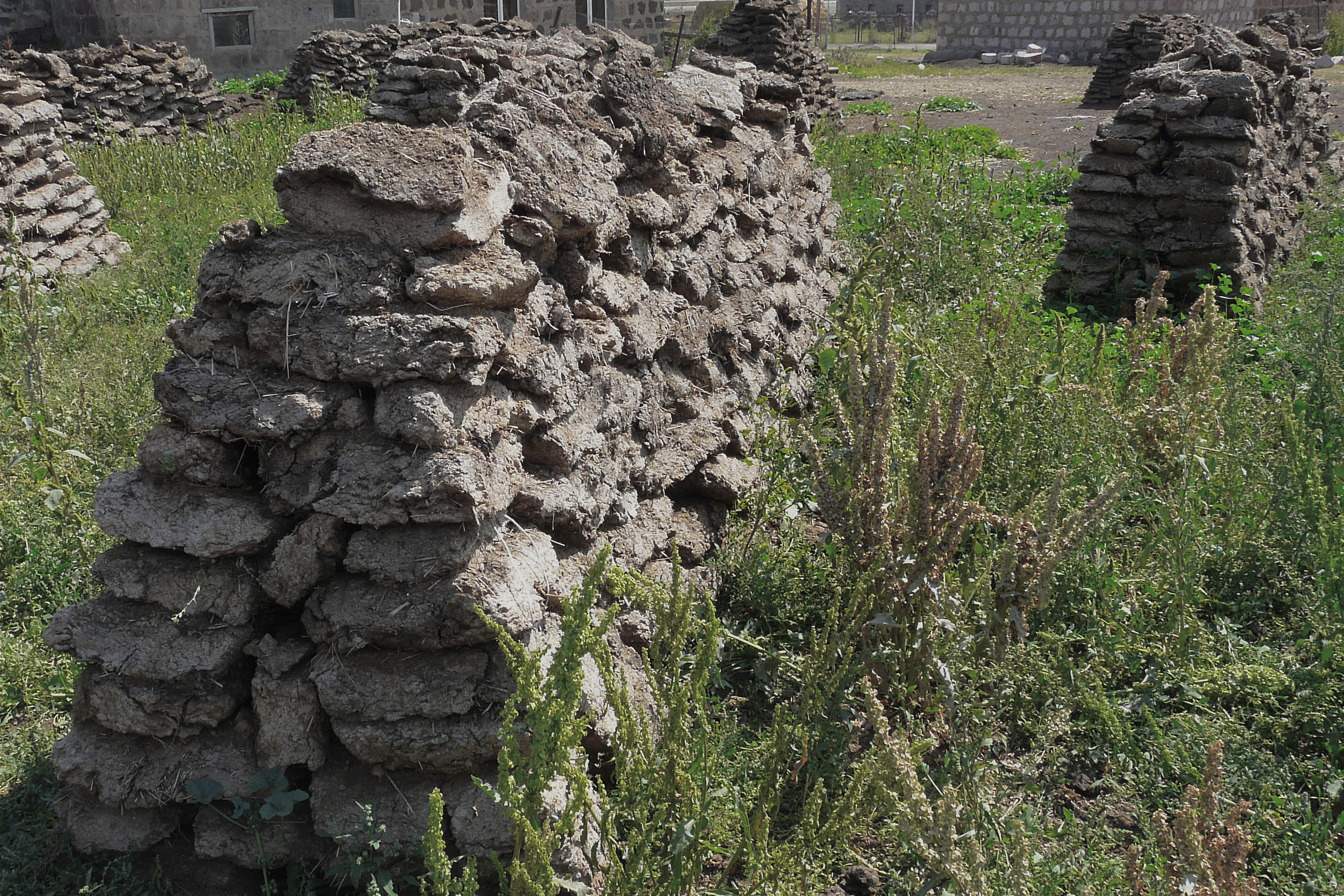
Dry animal dung fuel in Armenia

The second one is biomass. Scientists share the opinion that Armenia has the most energy-diverse market in the Caucasus. The reason for this is that, in addition to gas and electricity used for heating, people from many towns and villages use biomass, such as wood and manure. Thus biomass pellets have large prospective as they burn cleaner, hotter, and are more conventional.

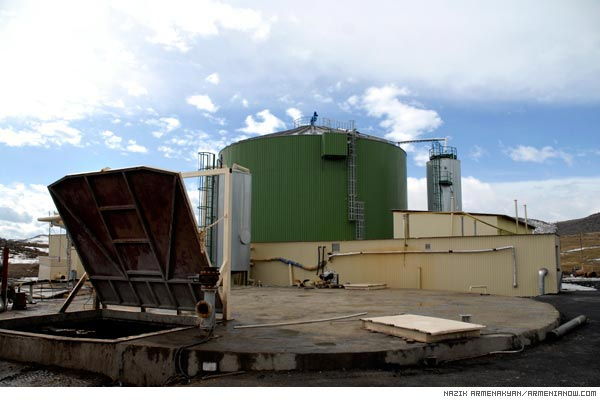
Lusakert Biogas Plant

Biogas yielded from manure can be a good source for generating both heat and electricity. An example of this in Armenia is Lusakert Biogas Plant in Nor Geghi, Kotayk Marz. It was built in 2008, and is still working properly with a nominal capacity of 0.85 MW. After being built, the power plant won a National Energy Globe Award.

== See also ==
- Energy in Armenia
- Electricity sector in Armenia
- Solar power in Armenia
- Renewable energy
- Renewable energy by country
- Renewable energy in Asia
- Renewable energy in Europe
