= Karkar Geothermal Power Plant =

Geothermal power plant

Coordinates: 39°47′00.2″N 45°56′27.6″E

Karkar GPP proposed site
- Official name: Karkar Geothermal Power Plant
- Country: Armenia
- Location: Karkar
- Status: Proposed

Geothermal power station
- Type: Flash

Power generation
- Nameplate capacity: 28-30 MW
- Annual net output: 250 million kWh

The Karkar Geothermal Power Plant (Karkar GTPP) (Armenian: Կարկառի երկրաջերմաէլեկտրակայան) is a proposed geothermal power plant to be constructed in Armenia. The plant will be the first of its kind in Armenia and will be situated at the Karkar site in the southernmost province of Armenia, Syunik. Initial studies envisage the construction of a 28-30 MW capacity geothermal power plant with an annual electric output of 250 million kilowatt hours (kWh) according to data provided in 2016. The Karkar GTPP will allow for the production of heat to be used in the heating of greenhouses, residential buildings, and industrial sites. Commissioned in 2008-2009, the Karkar GTPP is a unique project in Armenia in that it does not possess an analogue in the region, and positively differs from other energy producing power plants in its renewability of resources, independence from imported energy sources, as well as its minimal environmental impact.

== Site selection ==
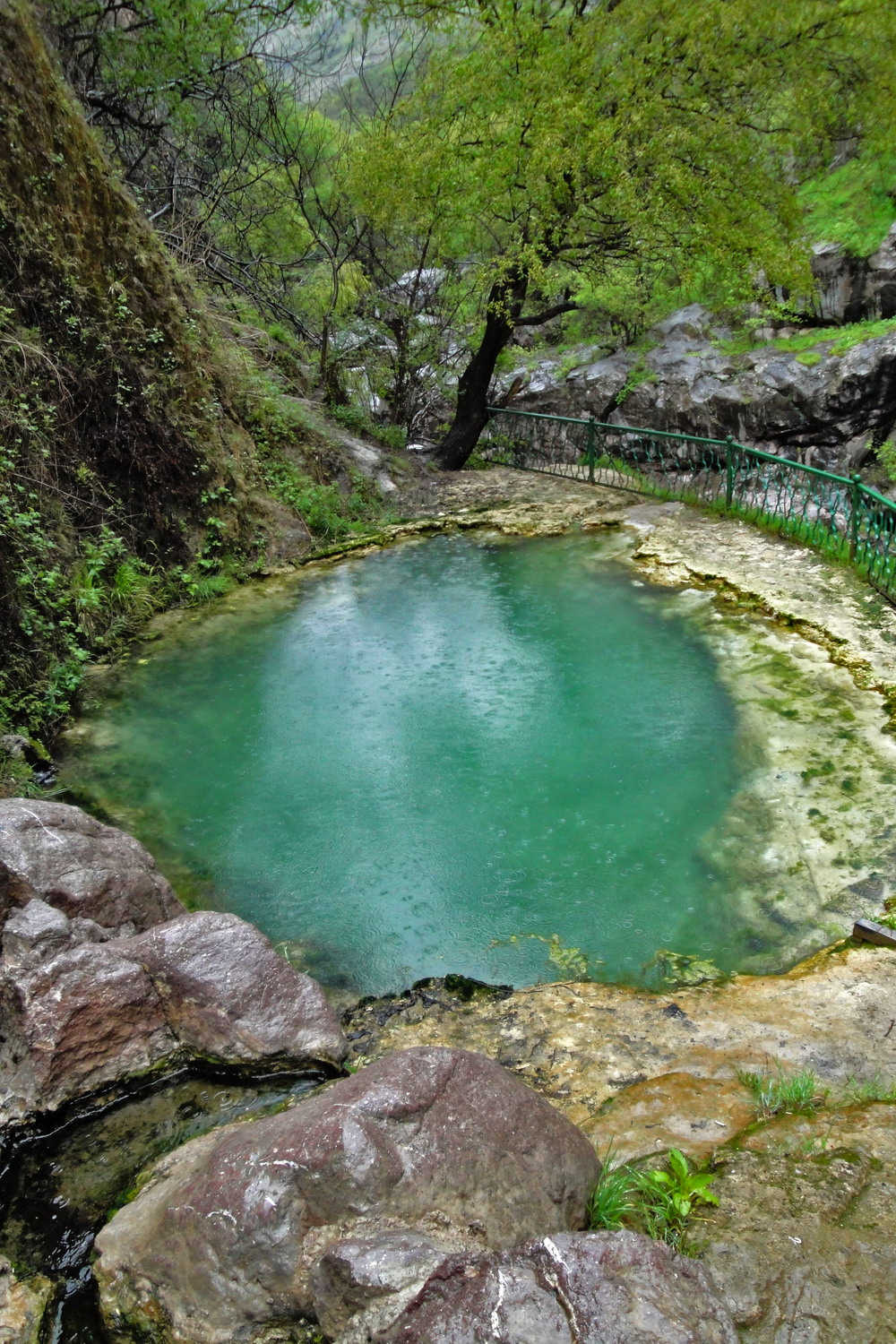
A thermal lake near Satani Kamurj, Syunik Province

The Karkar site was selected for exploratory drilling on the basis of field investigations for the prospective sites of Jermaghbyur and Karkar, which were recognized as the most promising by both local and international geothermal experts. In 2006, the World Bank (WB) Energy Invest PIU contracted Ameria CJSC, a professional advisory and insurance services company registered in Armenia to draft a detailed feasibility study for the construction of the Karkar GTPP.

The study was executed in the framework of a governmental plan aimed at diversifying energy sources in Armenia, and achieving greater independence from foreign imported energy sources. The results of the feasibility study demonstrated the possibility of constructing a flash type geothermal power plant functioning on the basis of 6 production boreholes at 2.5–3 km depth, and 2 boreholes for return flow at 3 km depth with an installed capacity of 25 MW. The necessary investment was estimated in the amount of 17.6 billion AMD, with specific costs per kilowatt of installed capacity at US$1564. At the time of the study, the annual average electricity production was thought to be 199.4 million kWh. That number has today grown to 250 million kWh. The study demonstrated the strategic importance and effectiveness of using geothermal energy in Armenia for the provision of heat supply and the generation of electric power.

The field investigations at the prospective sites, which included field scoutings, magnetotelluric (MT) sounding and 3D MT studies, along with independent interpretations of the results of these studies, were supported under the Geofund 2: Armenia Geothermal Project financed by the GEF and were completed in 2012.

== Exploratory Drilling ==
The Geothermal Exploratory Drilling Project (GEDP) is a new project consisting of two independent stages, which aim to confirm the suitability of the geothermal resource at the Karkar field for electric power generation. If confirmed, future steps will include involvement of the private sector in the development of a geothermal power plant. Geothermal resources differ from other renewable energy sources, such as wind, solar and hydro in that the commercial exploitability of a geothermal field largely depends on its meeting of certain specific parameters of temperature and pressure. These parameters may be considered with sufficient confidence only upon viable assessment of the results of exploratory drillings.

The GEDP was implemented with the support of the World Bank. On Monday, 8 June 2016 the World Bank Board of Executive Directors approved a US$8.55 million grant for the realization of the first stage of the project, with Arthur Kochnakyan appointed as the World Bank Task Team Leader for the project. The objective of the Government of Armenia is to construct a geothermal power plant at the Karkar site upon confirmation of the availability of exploitable geothermal resources. With a total potential for geothermal power currently estimated at approximately 150MW, indigenous Armenian geothermal resources have the potential to become an affordable source of base load electricity, in turn contributing to the country's energy security.

== Initial stage ==
Initial exploration consists of drilling of three separate wells 1500 m deep, which will require the use of the US$9 million provided by the Climate Investment Funds and the 2 million AMD supplied by the Government of Armenia. The much-needed involvement of commercial investors for the funding of the resource validation phase of the project has been greatly deterred by a combination of high capital requirements, with drilling costs typically ranging between US$2 and US$5 million per well, highly uncertain results, and the time required for its completion. The R2E2 Fund, a non-profit organization established by the Government of Armenia in 2005 with the specific objective of promoting development of renewable energies and energy efficiency markets in Armenia, will be responsible for the implementation of the project. The Fund has the required capacity and necessary experience in implementing Bank financed projects.

July 2016 saw the construction of the first slim well for exploratory purposes. An access road to the Karkar site was previously constructed to allow for the transportation and installation of rig pads required for drilling of the slim well(s), as well as other infrastructures. Should primary drilling yield positive results, a full feasibility study of the area will be completed to provide necessary information regarding the type of geothermal technology to be installed at the site. The feasibility study will also allow for the determination of future economic and financial performance estimates, as well as for helping find solutions to issues ranging from compliance with environmental and social safeguards to legal and regulatory concerns. The contribution of the Government of Armenia to the project is expressed in the form of land provision, support in obtaining all the necessary permits, co-financing of taxes, supporting the construction of transmission lines and the infrastructure demanded at the site, as well as the provision of tax exemptions.

During a policy seminar held on 23 September 2016 regarding "The Challenges of Energy Security in Armenia", Deputy Minister of Energy Infrastructures and Natural Resources of Armenia, Areg Galstyan, announced that the first results of exploratory drilling of geothermal sources were due in 2016. In a latter interview given on 27 October 2016, the same deputy minister informed journalists of the completion of the appraisal of geothermal resources in the Karkar site with optimistic first results for the survey, particularly with regards to compliance of specific temperature and pressure requirements. A final assessment of the area's geothermal power capacity is to be drafted on the basis of the results obtained upon completion of the exploratory drilling stage.

== Second stage ==
The second stage of GEDP envisages the construction phase of the geothermal power station. Initial construction costs of the geothermal power plant are projected to be US$90 million to 110 million, which are to be subsidized by public and private capital (i.e commercial debt and equity) in accordance with a specific financing plan of the Government of Armenia. An international tender is to be announced based on the final results of the exploratory drillings to attract investors for the development of the plant, where priority will be given to the lowest bidder.

In the event of its construction, the Karkar Geothermal Power Plant is set to occupy an approximate area of 1.5 hectares, which will include piping and parking areas, warehouses and maintenance facilities, a fluid storage house, workers' quarters, and associated facilities pursuant to the building footprint of the future plant. A total of 4 to 10 production and injection wells with casing diameters of 18 5/8 inches at the surface narrowing to 7 inches at 1250 meters are to be drilled and installed to harness the heat of the rocks situated at similar depths. The heat trapped by these rocks reach temperatures of 99 °C at depths of 920 meters, escalating towards 250-300 °C at 2500–3000 meters as demonstrated by the Jermaghbyur borehole data.

== See also ==
- Jermaghbyur Geothermal Power Plant
- Electricity sector in Armenia
- Renewable energy in Armenia
