= Currency of Armenia =

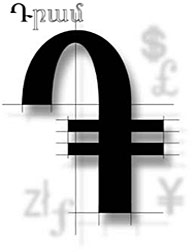
The Armenian dram sign

This article provides a historical summary of the currencies and monetary units of the country of Armenia throughout its history, in addition to the Armenian regions of the Russian Empire and Transcaucasian SSR and the majority-Armenian but internationally unrecognized Republic of Artsakh.

== List of currencies of Armenia ==
Past and present currencies used in Armenia include:

- Dram coins
- Takvorin coins
- First Transcaucasian ruble
- Armenian ruble
- Second Transcaucasian ruble
- Soviet ruble
- Russian ruble (CIS monetary union)
- Armenian dram
  - Luma, 1/100 of a dram
- Artsakh dram

== History ==
The first instance of a "dram" currency (Armenian: դրամ, lit. "money") was in the period from 1199 to 1375, when silver coins called dram or tram were issued. Dram or Takvorin coinage would periodically continue to be produced until the modern era. A series of attempts to localize the Russian ruble under the Soviet Union and Commonwealth of Independent States (CIS) followed. On 21 September 1991, a national referendum proclaimed Armenia as a republic independent from the Soviet Union. The Central Bank of Armenia, established on 27 March 1993, was given the exclusive right of issuing the national currency.

In the immediate aftermath of the collapse of the Soviet Union, attempts were made to maintain a common currency (the Russian ruble) among CIS states. Armenia joined this ruble zone. However it soon became clear that maintaining a currency union in the unstable political and economical circumstances of the post-Soviet states would be very difficult. The Ruble Zone effectively collapsed with the unilateral 1993 Russian monetary reform process. As a result, the remaining CIS participants – Kazakhstan, Uzbekistan, Turkmenistan, Moldova, Armenia, and Georgia – were 'pushed out' and forced to introduce separate currencies. Armenia was one of the last countries to do so when it introduced the dram on 22 November 1993.

== See also ==
- Economy of Armenia
- List of people on coins of Armenia
