= Rafael Papayan =

Armenian philologist (1942–2010)

- Born: 22 December 1942; Soviet Armenia
- Died: 5 October 2010 (aged 68); Yerevan, Armenia
- Occupations: philologist, political prisoner, human rights activist, writer, judge on the Constitutional Court of Armenia

Rafael Aramashoti Papayan (Armenian: Ռաֆայել Արամաշոտի Պապայան; December 22, 1942 – October 5, 2010) was a philologist, political prisoner, human rights activist, writer and a judge on the Constitutional Court of Armenia.

== Early life ==
Rafael Papayan was born on December 22, 1942, in Soviet Armenia in the city of Yerevan. He is the son of Aramashot and Yeva Papayan. His father was an Armenian playwright and actor.

In 1964 he was removed from the Young Communist Union of Yerevan Brusov State University of Languages and Social Sciences due to a published article in the "Brusovets" student newspaper.

He married Arpine Papayan in January 1970, whom he had met in 1967 at a poetry theatre. Together they had two children, Vahagn and Anahit Papayan.

=== Education ===
In 1965 he graduated from the Yerevan Brusov State University of Languages and Social Sciences as a philologist. He continued his studies in the University of Tartu from 1969 to 1972 under the guidance of the literary historian and semiotician, Juri Lotman. He received the title of Candidate of Sciences while defending his scientific thesis.

== Career ==
=== Teaching ===
From 1965 to 1967, Papayan worked as a teacher in the Ujan village of the Ashtarak region. Soon after, he became a junior fellow at the department of Russian Languages at the Yerevan Brusov State University of Languages and Social Sciences. Following that, he was a junior fellow at the cabinet of the literary relations of Yerevan State University.

From 1972 to 1980 Papayan worked as a lecturer and professor at Yerevan State University.

In 1981–1982, he worked in the laboratory of Armenology as a senior researcher at Yerevan State University.

In 1989 he became the founder and head of the chair of Armenology at the Yerevan State Conservatory.

=== Human Rights and Political Activity ===
Papayan took part in dissident activities from early on. He was one of the founders of the Armenian Helsinki Group in 1975, which discovered and published various human rights abuses within Soviet Armenia. He took part in preparing documents, international correspondence and passing on samizdat literature. After documented evidence of the Soviet Union's violations were presented in the 1977 Belgrade Conference, Papayan and his colleague Edmond Avetyan’s apartments were searched. No arrests were made due to their high-profile status as scholars in Armenia and abroad. Following this, Papayan was stripped of his right to teach at Yerevan State University. From 1977 to 1982 Papayan did not teach but continued to engage in scientific and political activities.

On November 10, 1982, Papayan was arrested and charged under Article 65 of the Criminal Code of the Armenian SSR- anti-Soviet agitation and propaganda. He was accused of circulating samizdat literature. In July 1983, Papayan was sentenced to four years in a maximum security prison camp in Barashevo, Mordovia and two years in exile. Papayan was joined by Georgi Khomizuri, Henrik Altunyan, Levan Berdzenishvili and many other intellectuals in the strict political prison camp. They took part in many strikes, including hunger strikes, which caused Papayan to be transferred to solitary confinement several times. During his sentence he would use special fonts in his letters to transfer information to his friends outside of the prison camp. This information would be spread through secret information channels. In November 1986 he was exiled to Millerovo, Russia. In 1987 he was released early due to Gorbachev’s reforms.

Upon his return to Yerevan, Armenia, Papayan took part in the national movement and was one of the independent intellectual figures that pushed for Armenia's final independence. In 1989 he formed and chaired the Armenian League for Human Rights. He participated in the United Nations Commission on Human Rights in Geneva in March 1990 to present a report on the Nagorno-Karabakh conflict. He was the first person to present the human rights crisis of Nagorno-Karabakh on the stage of the United Nations Commission on Human Rights.

In 1990-1995 he was the chairman of the Standing Committee for Human Rights.

In 1990 he was elected as deputy of the National Assembly (Armenia) and re-elected in 1995.

In 1995–1997 he and was the Chairman of the Standing Committee on Education, Science and Culture.

In 1997 he became a member of the Constitutional Court and in 1998 he was awarded the Highest Qualification of a Judge.

He was posthumously awarded the Gold Medal of the Constitutional Court of Armenia.

=== Spiritual Leadership ===
Papayan was a member of the Supreme Spiritual Council of the Armenian Apostolic Church since 1991.

In 1992 he was a member of the Religious Council of the Holy See of Etchmiadzin.

In 1994–1997 he was a member of the inter-parliamentary council on orthodoxy.

In 1995 he was awarded by the Russian Orthodox Church and by the All Russian Patriarch Alexy II of Moscow. He was given the medal of St. Daniel Moskovsky for the "Services provided to the Holy Church."

On August 15, 2003, Papayan was awarded the medal of St. Nerses Shnorhali by the Catholicos of All Armenians, Karekin II.

=== Writing ===
Papayan's literary works range from translations, philosophy, literary criticism, science and poetry. He is the author of more than 150 literary works and scientific articles. His works have been published in Armenia, Russia, Estonia, France and elsewhere.

==== Poetry ====
- Alarms – Yerevan, 1991, 83 pages
- To Anahit – Yerevan, 2002
- Flight – Yerevan, 2010, 288 pages
- Rainbow – 2010

==== Translations ====
- Misak Metsarents Poetry – Yerevan, 1997
- Fyodor Tyutchev Poetry – Yerevan, 2006, 445 pages
- Verses and Songs – Yerevan, 2008, 187 pages
- 20th Century Armenian Poetry; Selected Pages – Moscow, Russia, 2008, 296 pages
- The Unsilenceable Belfry by Paruyr Sevak – Yerevan, 2009, 343 pages

==== Philosophy ====
- Christianity and Law; International Seminar – Yerevan, Armenia, 2001, 144 pages
- Christian Roots of Modern Law – Mother See of Holy Etchmiadzin Publishing House, 2002, 679 pages

==== Literary Criticism ====
- Comparative Typology of National Verse – Yerevan, 1980, 228 pages
- Reflections on a Line by Pushkin – Yerevan, 2014, 79 pages

=== Musician ===
Papayan was a self-taught musician who played the piano. He was accepted into the Romanos Melikian State Musical College in 1960 but did not complete his studies due to his simultaneous enrollment at Yerevan Brusov State University of Languages and Social Sciences. He also composed music, most of which accompanied his poetry.

Among performed or published works are:

- "Ode to Holy Church of Armenia" (Choir of Armenian National Philharmonic Orchestra, conducted by Loris Tjeknavorian, 2001
- "Anthem of the Constitutional Court of Armenia."
- "String Quartet" (2009)

== Later life ==
In the last years of his life Papayan was working on his book Flight during his cancer diagnosis. The book consisted of selected poems and translations. He died as soon as he completed the final edits. The book Flight was dedicated to all the victims of the Soviet Gulag.

Papayan died in Yerevan, Armenia on October 5, 2010, at the age of 68. His funeral service was conducted by the Catholicos of All Armenians, Karekin II.
