= Central Bank Visitor Centre (Armenia) =

Coordinates: 40°10′33″N 44°30′38″E

- ՀՀ կենտրոնական բանկի այցելուների կենտրոն
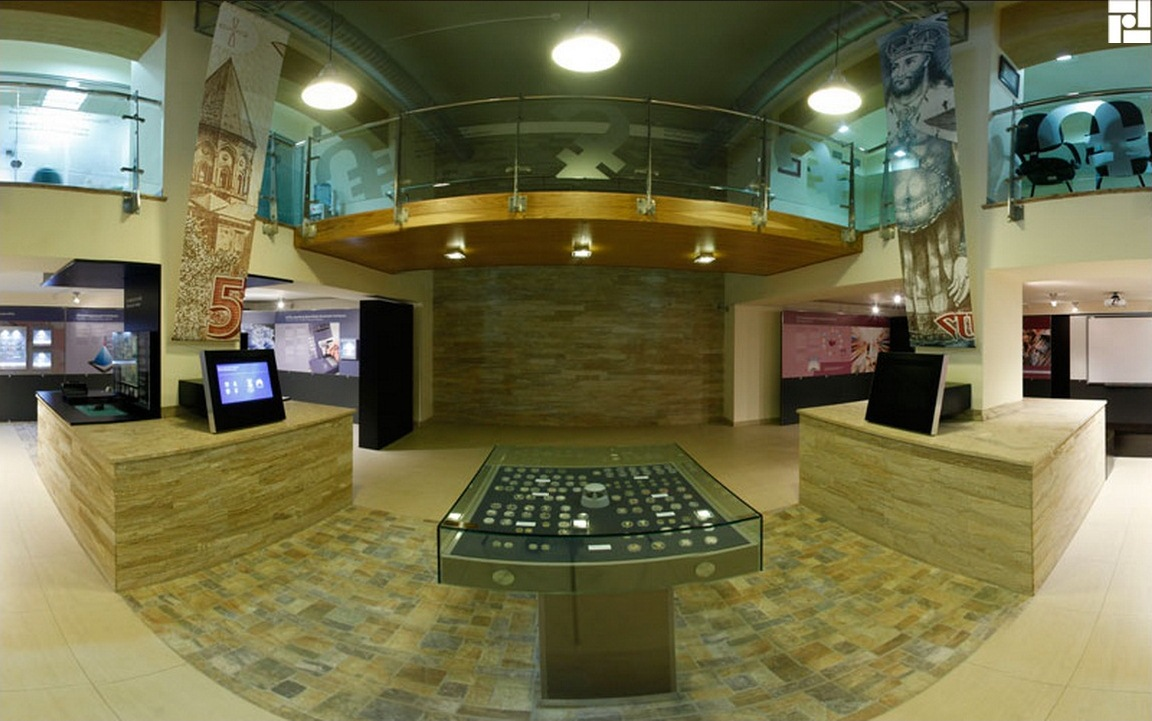
- Established: 20 September 2011
- Location: Yerevan, Armenia
- Type: Interactive museum
- Director: Ms. Zaruhi Barseghyan

The Central Bank Visitor Centre (Armenian: ՀՀ կենտրոնական բանկի այցելուների կենտրոն) is a Centre and an interactive museum in Yerevan, Armenia dedicated to the activities of the Central Bank of Armenia, the monetary policy of Armenia, and the history of money. The museum was opened on 20 September 2011. It is located in the historic building of the Central Bank and occupies 2 floors.

== Exhibitions ==
Exhibition resources include 24 static displays, 2 interactive zones – a laboratory for checking notes and coins, an automated teller machine, 2 sets of multimedia games, a movie on the history of the national currency, 2 movies on the history and activities of the Central Bank, cartoon films about price stability and financial system's operations, and thematic video-clips.

== Historical exhibition ==
In the historical section of the exhibition, the history of money circulation is presented, starting with the pre-money era and the first Armenian coins of the Kingdoms of Sophene and Commagene, the coins of Tigranes the Great, the Parthians and the Sassanid, the Roman Empire, the Arab Caliphate, the king Kiurike II, Byzantium; on the display are the coins of Cilicia, Mongolian, Persian, Ottoman coins, banknotes of the Russian Empire, the Transcaucasian Commissariat, the First Armenian Republic, Soviet Armenia, the Transcaucasian Democratic Federative Republic and the Soviet Union, two series of the coins and notes of the Republic of Armenia, all commemorative coins and the history of the Armenian banking system.

- Pre-money era
- First coins of Armenian states of Sophene and Commagene, 3-1 centuries BC.
- Silver and copper coins of Tigran the Great (95- 55 BC) of the Artashessian dynasty, 1st century BC to AD 1st century
- Arsacid dynasty, coins of the Romans, Parthians, Sassanid, 1–7 centuries
- Coins of Arab Caliphate, Dvin, coins of Georgian kings, 7–13 centuries, Byzantine, the Armenian Bagratuni dynasty, 9-11 centuries, copper coins of the king Kiurike II, middle of 11th century, the first coin with Armenian inscriptions
- Mongol-Tatar yoke, 13 – 14 centuries, Ani.
- The Russian Empire, early 19th century to 1917; Opening the Erivan branch of the State Bank of the Russian Empire, 1893.
- Bonds of the Transcaucasian commissariat, 1917–1918. These are the first notes which carry writings in Armenian.
- Rubles of the first Republic of Armenia, 1918–1920
- Soviet Armenia, 1921–1922
- Transcaucasian Federative Union, 1923–1924
- The Union of Soviet Socialist Republics 1924 -1991(1993)
- Armenia as an independent country, September 21, 1991

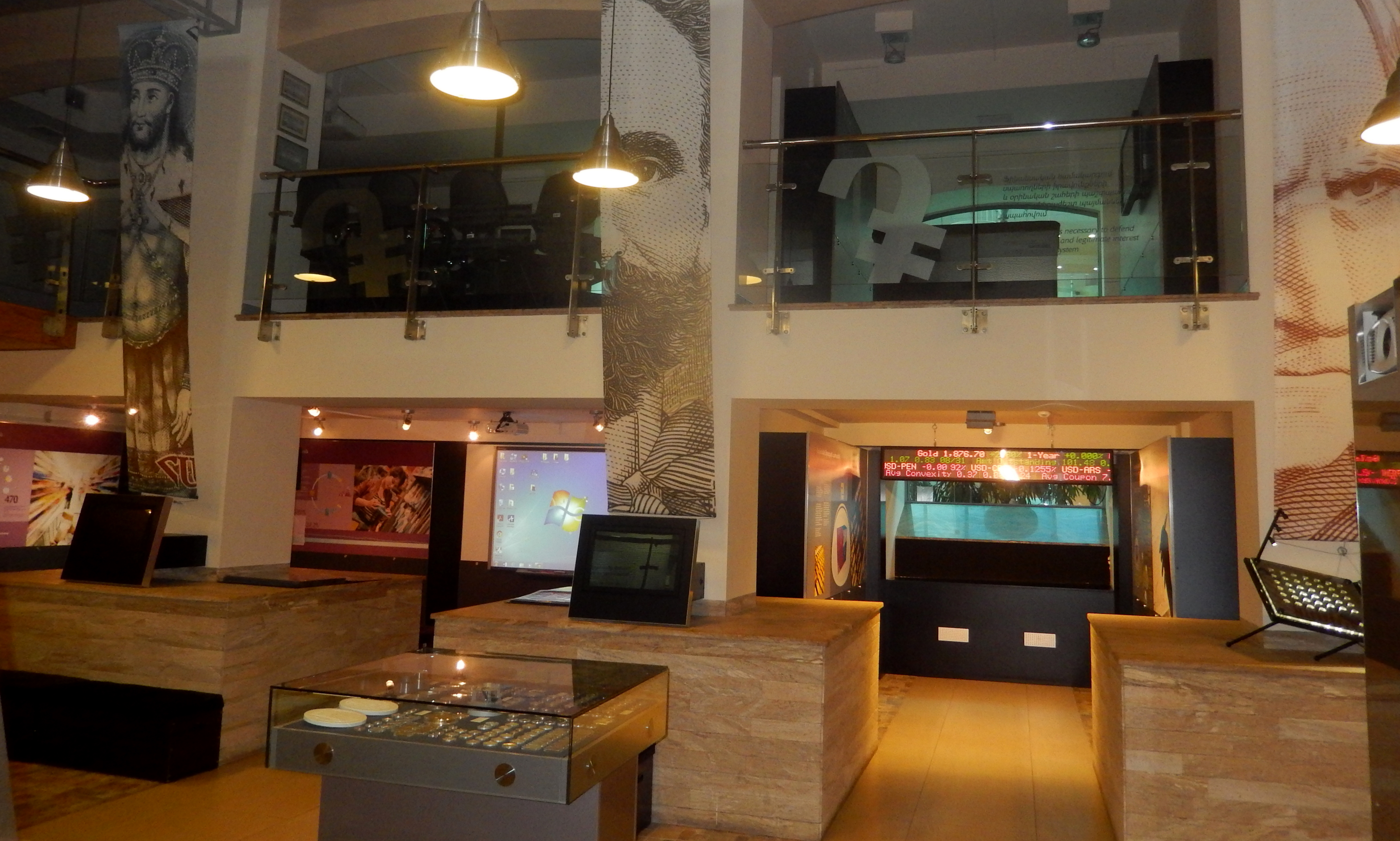

== Functions of the Central Bank of Armenia ==
Further information on the functions of the Central Bank can be found, including:

- Maintaining price stability; the inflation rate, the refinancing rate, the consumer basket,
- Maintaining stability of the financial system; the system's structure, the Fund for Guaranteeing Deposits of Individuals, the Office of Financial System Mediator, the Credit Bureau,
- Emission of National currency of the Republic of Armenia,
- Developing the payment and settlements systems,
- Managing the international reserves of Armenia.

== See also ==
- Armenian dram
- Armenian dram sign
- Economy of Armenia
