= Sovetashen =

Sovetashen may refer to:

- Nubarashen, Armenia
- Zangakatun, Armenia
