= Vardan Ajemian =

- Վարդան Աճեմյան
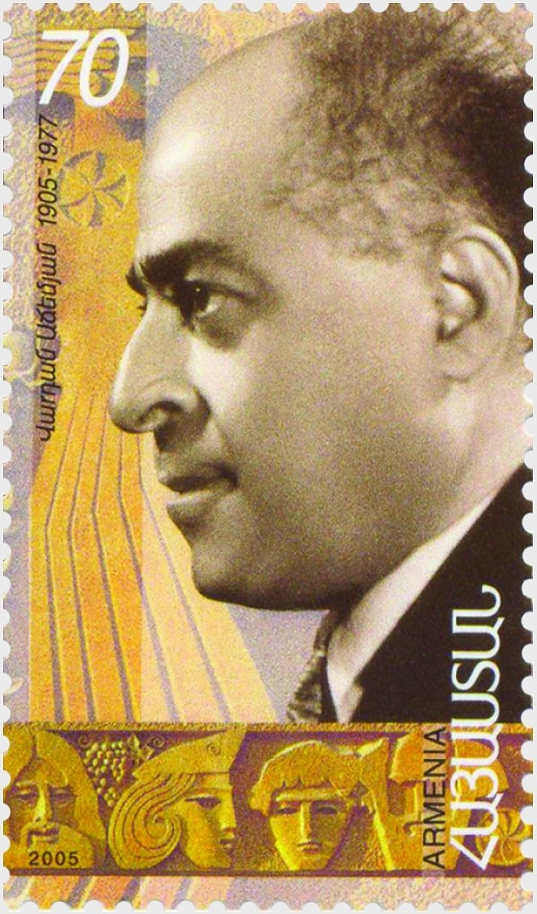
- Ajemian on a stamp of Armenia
- Born: September 15, 1905; Van, Ottoman Empire
- Died: January 24, 1977 (aged 71); Yerevan, Armenian SSR, Soviet Union
- Occupations: theatral director and actor
- Known for: founder of the Second Armenian State Theatre (Gyumri State Theatre)
- Awards: People's Artist of the USSR (1965) Hero of Socialist Labour (1975) State Prize of the Armenian SSR (1971)

Vardan Mkrtchi Ajemian (Note: Armenian: Վարդան Մկրտչի Աճեմյան, romanized: Vardan Mkrtči Ač̣emyan; Western Armenian: Վարդան Աճէմեան, romanized: Vartan Ajēmean) (September 15, 1905 – January 24, 1977) was an Armenian theatrical director and actor. He was named People's Artist of USSR in 1965 and Hero of Socialist Labour in 1975.

== Biography ==
Ajemian was born in Van, Ottoman Empire and studied in Yerevan and Moscow. In 1928 he founded the Second Armenian State Theatre (Gyumri State Theatre). In 1939 he moved to Yerevan Sundukian Theatre and became its artistic director. He directed Alexander Shirvanzade's For the Honour (1939), William Saroyan's My Heart is in the Mountains (1961), Papazian's Rock (1944), Nairi Zarian's Ara Geghetsik (1946), Aramashot Papayan's The World, Yes, Turned Upside Down (1967) and several musical presentations. He won State Prizes of the USSR in 1951 and of the Armenian SSR in 1971. He died in Yerevan, Armenian SSR.

== Awards ==
- Hero of Socialist Labor (8 December 1975)
- People's Artist of the USSR (30 September 1965)
- Honored Cultural Figure of the Armenian SSR (1967)
- State Prize of the Armenian SSR (1971)
- Stalin Prize, 3rd class (1951)
- Order of Lenin (27 June 1956, 8 December 1975)
- Order of the Badge of Honor (24 November 1945)

== See also ==
- Vardan Adjemyan (b. 1956) is a grandson.

== Sources ==
- Armenian Concise Encyclopedia, Ed. by acad. K. Khudaverdian, Yerevan, 1990, p. 147-148
