= Vadim Yankov =

Russian mathematician (1935–2024)

- Born: 1 February 1935
- Died: 11 March 2024 (aged 89)
- Conviction: Anti-Soviet agitation
- Penalty: 4 years in prison 3 years in exile

Details
- Date apprehended: 1982
- Imprisoned at: Russia, Soviet Union

Vadim Anatolyevich Yankov (Russian: Вади́м Анато́льевич Янко́в; 1 February 1935 – 11 March 2024) was a Russian mathematician, philosopher, and political prisoner.

In 1968, Yankov co-signed a letter of 99 Soviet mathematicians asking for the release of imprisoned mathematician Alexander Esenin-Volpin.

Shortly before the 1981 martial law crisis in Poland, Yankov sent out a seven-page samizdat letter "A Letter to Russian Workers about the Events in Poland". In it, he encouraged the Soviet working class to follow the example of Solidarity, stressing social participation and non-violent protest.

In 1982, he was arrested and charged with anti-Soviet agitation and propaganda. He was sentenced in January 1983 to four years of imprisonment and three years in internal exile. He served his time in Dubravlag labor camp in Mordovia, near Moscow, and his exile in Buryatia in south-central Siberia. He was released in January 1987 and rehabilitated in 1991. Yankov is featured as a prominent character in Levan Berdzenishvili's novel Sacred Darkness, describing their joint time in prison.

After 1991, he taught mathematics and philosophy at the Department of Intellectual Systems at Russian State University for the Humanities in Moscow.

Yankov died on 11 March 2024, at the age of 89.

== Bibliography ==
- Alex Citkin, Ioannis M. Vandoulakis (eds.), V. A. Yankov on Non-Classical Logics, History and Philosophy of Mathematics, Cham, Switzerland, 2022.
- Alex Citkin, Ioannis M. Vandoulakis "In Memoriam Vadim Anatol’evich Yankov (1935-2024)" ArXiv, https://arxiv.org/pdf/2502.05525v1
- Kirill Yankov, Alex Citkin, Ioannis Vandoulakis and Tatiana Denisova, In memory of the distinguished logician, philosopher and political activist V.A. Yankov (1935 - 2024), Logica Universalis Webinar (2024, August 14), https://doi.org/10.52843/cassyni.jsnd58
