= Levan Berdzenishvili =

Georgian politician

Levan Valerianis dze Berdzenishvili (Georgian: ლევან ვალერიანის ძე ბერძენიშვილი) is a Georgian politician, dissident and academic, who served as the director of the National Parliamentary Library of Georgia from 1998 until 2004.

== Biography ==
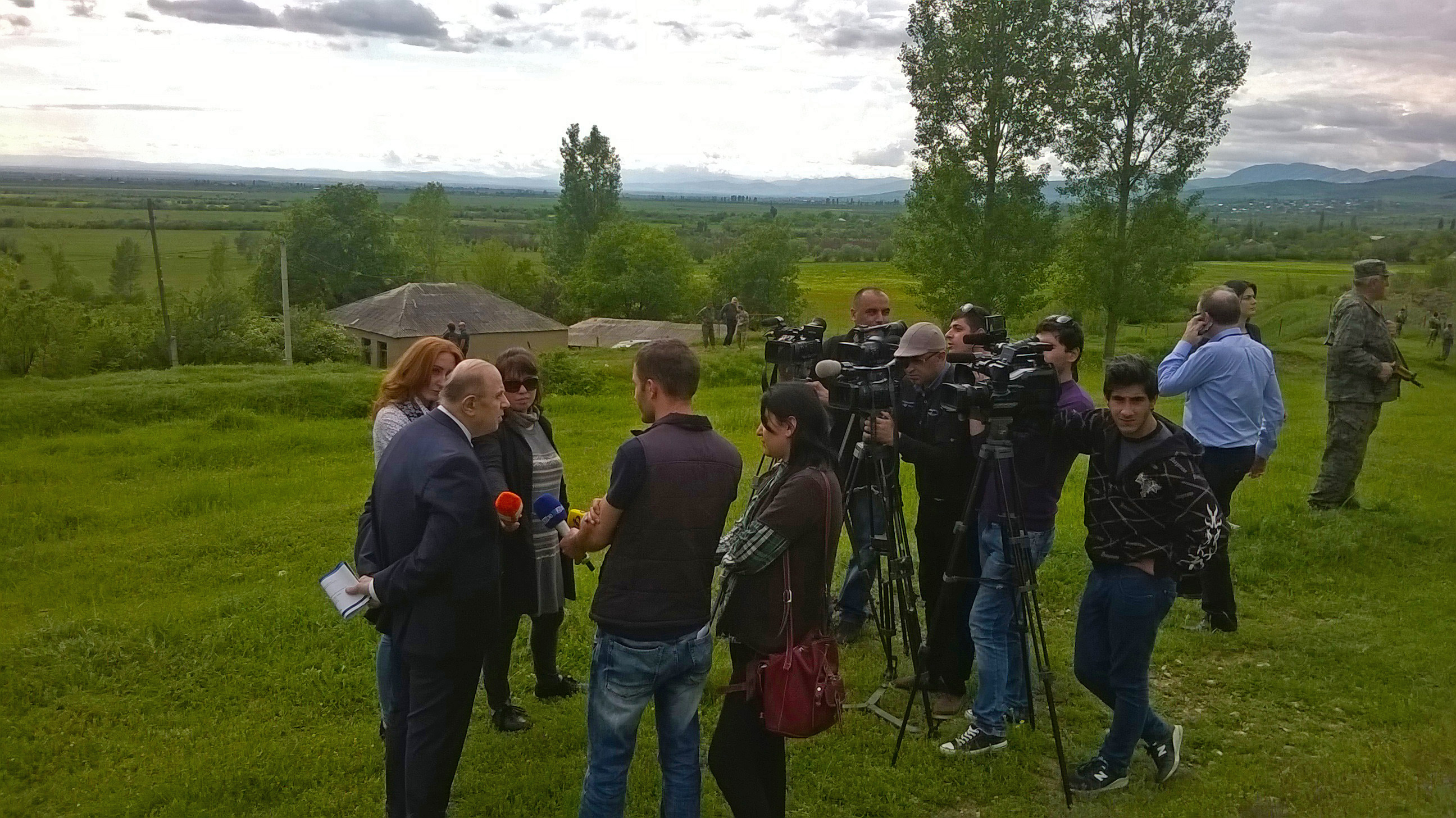
Berdzenishvili speaking with journalists near the Russian-occupied territories in Georgia.

Berdzenishvili was born in Batumi in 1953, and is the older brother of David Berdzenisvhili, also a politician. On May 21, 1978, Berdzenishvili and his brother David, together with Vakhtang Dzabiradze and Vakhtang Shonia, founded the Republican Party of Georgia.

In June 1983, he was arrested by the Soviet authorities and served several years in prison, as a dissident. Berdzenishvili has described his experiences in an autobiographical novel, Sacred Darkness: The Last Days of the GULAG, published in English in 2019. In the book, Berdzenishvili describes the years in prison as his "best years" because of the "people that surrounded me, people the KGB had so zealously brought together.” His book includes short sketches of fellow dissidents that he was imprisoned with, including Vadim Yankov, Rafael Papayan, Henrikh Altunyan, and others. In February 2020, Sacred Darkness was nominated for the EBRD literature prize.

From 2012 to 2016, Berdzenishvili served as a member of the Georgian Parliament as part of a coalition led by Georgian Dream, of which he later became a fierce critic. In this capacity, he also served on various committees, briefly heading up the committee of European integration. He previously served as an MP from 2004 to 2008, as part of the National Movement – Democrats. Berdzenishvili was among the supporters of the Rose Revolution, as a member of the National Movement, which he joined in 2002. Shortly after the Rose Revolution, Berdzenishvili and the Republican Party split from the governing faction, in June 2004.

Berdzenishvili has written on Greek and Latin comedies, and teaches at various universities in Georgia. Berdzenishvili also is a frequent commenter on public and social affairs in Georgia.
