= Da (Armenian) =

Letter in the Armenian alphabet

- Դ դ

Usage
- Writing system: Armenian script
- Type: Alphabetic
- Language of origin: Armenian language
- Sound values: d (Eastern Armenian) tʰ (Western Armenian)
- In Unicode: U+534, U+564
- Alphabetical position: 4

History
- Development: 𓉿: 𐤃; Δ δ; Դ դ
- Time period: 405 to present

Other
- Associated numbers: 4

Da, Ta, or T’a (majuscule: Դ; minuscule: դ; Armenian: դա) is the fourth letter of the Armenian alphabet, representing the voiced alveolar plosive (/d/) in Eastern Armenian and the aspirated voiceless alveolar plosive (/tʰ/) in Western Armenian. It is typically romanized with the letter D. It was part of the alphabet created by Mesrop Mashtots in the 5th century CE. In the Armenian numeral system, it has a value of 4.

The capital form of this letter, crossed with two horizontal lines, forms the Armenian dram sign.

== Character codes ==
Character information
Preview	Դ		դ	
Unicode name	ARMENIAN CAPITAL LETTER DA		ARMENIAN SMALL LETTER DA	
Encodings	decimal	hex	dec	hex
Unicode	1332	U+0534	1380	U+0564
UTF-8	212 180	D4 B4	213 164	D5 A4
Numeric character reference	&#1332;	&#x534;	&#1380;	&#x564;

== Gallery ==
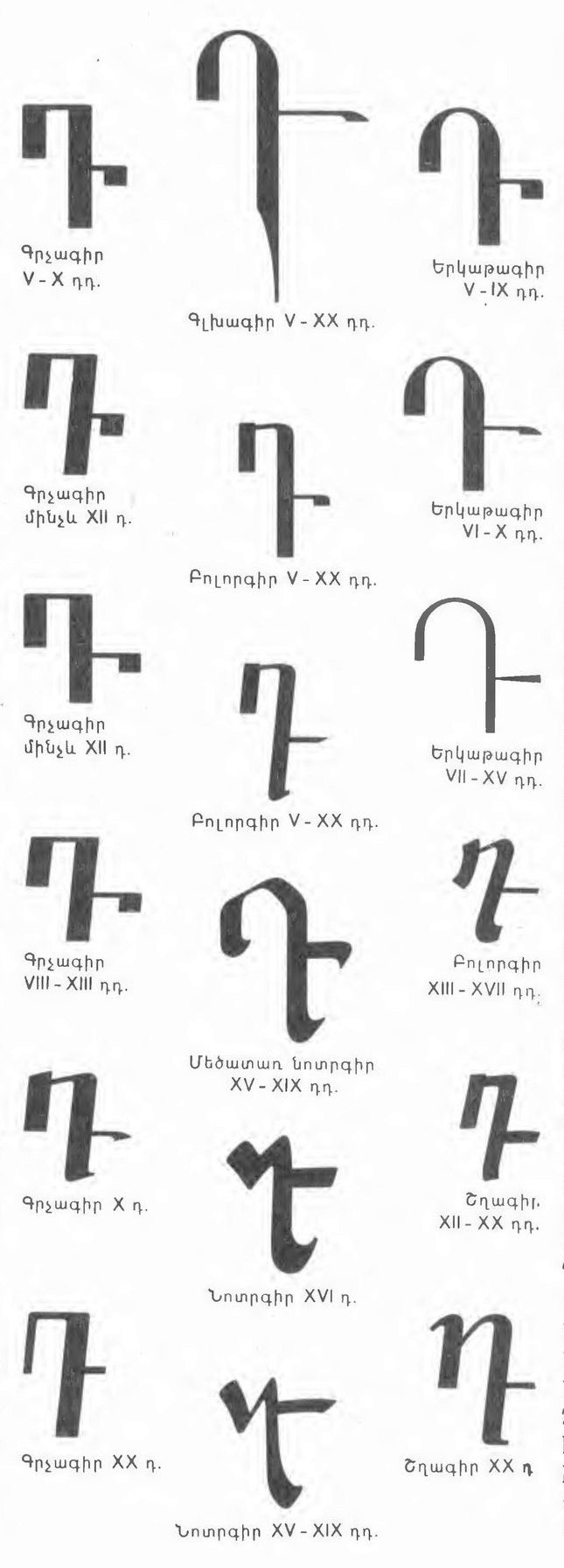
Various historic forms

Rounded Erkat'agir

Angular Erkat'agir

Bolorgir

Notrgir

Shghagir

Typographic form

Handwritten form

Eastern Braille form Dots-145

Western Braille form Dots-1456

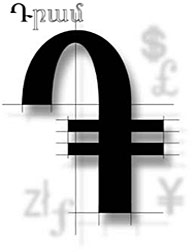
The Armenian dram sign
