= Hybrid paper-polymer banknote =

Type of banknote

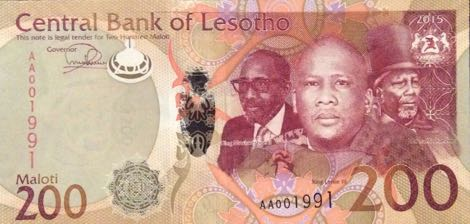
Hybrid banknote of Lesotho Maloti 200 in De La Rue's Optiks

A hybrid paper-polymer banknote or composite substrate is a banknote made from a mixture of paper and polymer substance.

Hybrid banknotes are essentially a paper banknote with a polymer patch. A polymer patch/band is applied vertically over the entire height of paper banknote, thus creating a clear window. The height of the polymer window generally measures 74 mm (depending on the height of the banknote) × 16 mm. Its thickness is 25 micrometres. Bulgaria was the first country to produce a hybrid paper polymer banknote, in a denomination of 20 Bulgarian leva in 2005.

Manufacturers of hybrid banknotes include Giesecke+Devrient's Hybrid and Varifeye, De La Rue's Optiks, Louisenthal's Hybrid, Landqart AG's DuraSafe and Banque de France's EverFit.

The countries and monetary unions which use hybrid banknotes include:

- Armenia
- Bahamas
- Bermuda
- Bhutan
- Bulgaria
- Burundi
- Cambodia
- C.CFA
- Comoros
- EU
- Fiji
- Iceland
- Iraq
- Jamaica
- Kazakhstan
- Latvia
- Lesotho
- Madagascar
- Malaysia
- Mauritania
- Morocco
- Oman
- Papua New Guinea
- Qatar
- Zimbabwe
- Russia
- Seychelles
- Solomon Islands
- South Africa
- Suriname
- Eswatini
- Switzerland
- Tajikistan
- Tonga
- UAE
- United Kingdom (Scotland)

== Gallery ==
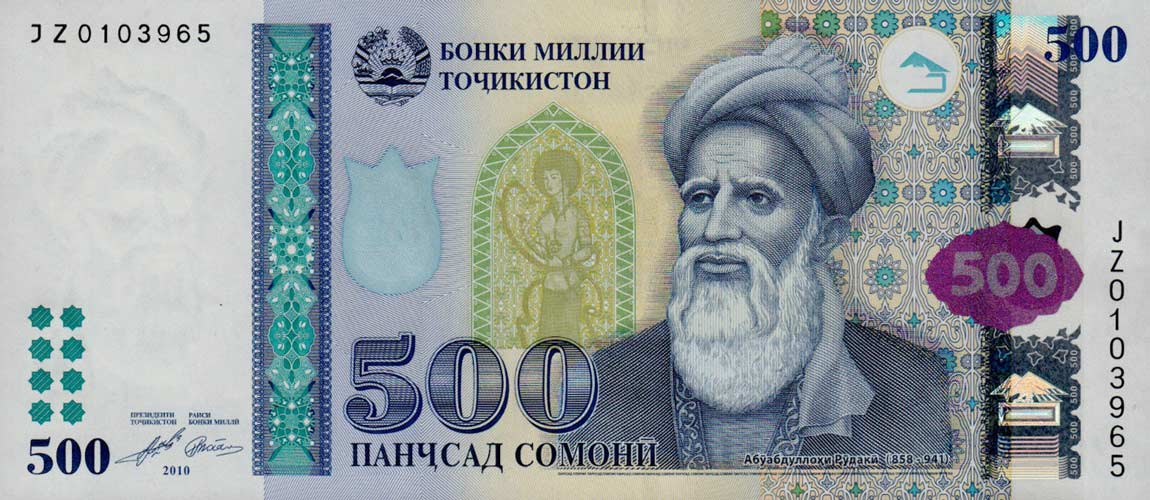
Tajikistan's 500 somoni banknote in G+D's Hybrid

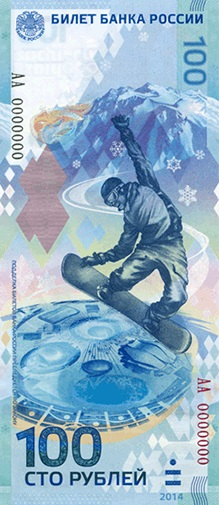
Russia's 100 ruble commemorating 2014 Winter Olympics

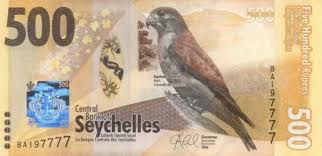
Seychelles's 500 rupee in De La Rue's Optiks

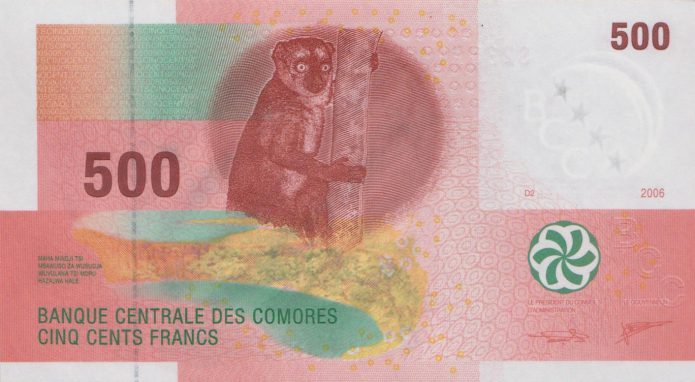
Comoros' 500 franc

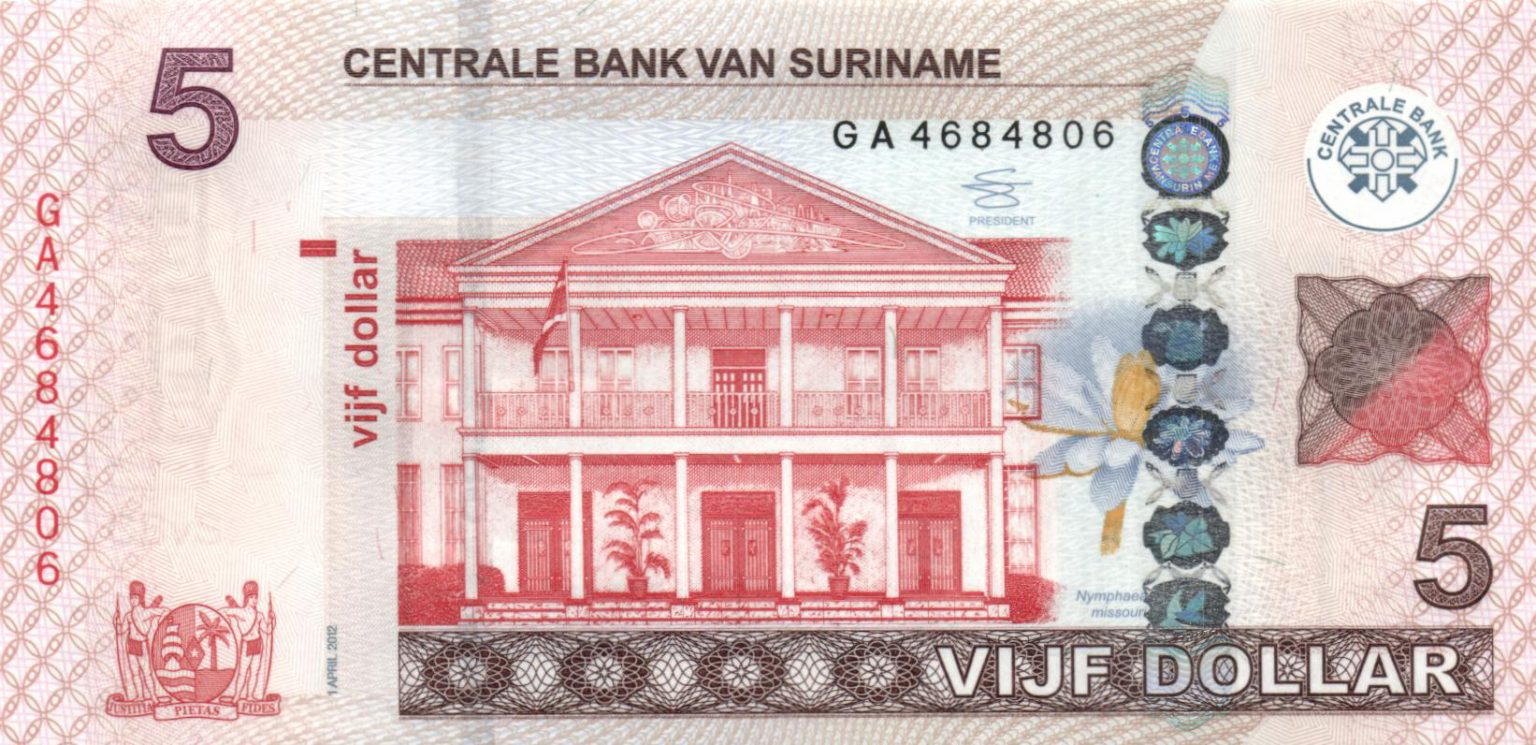
Suriname's 5 dollar

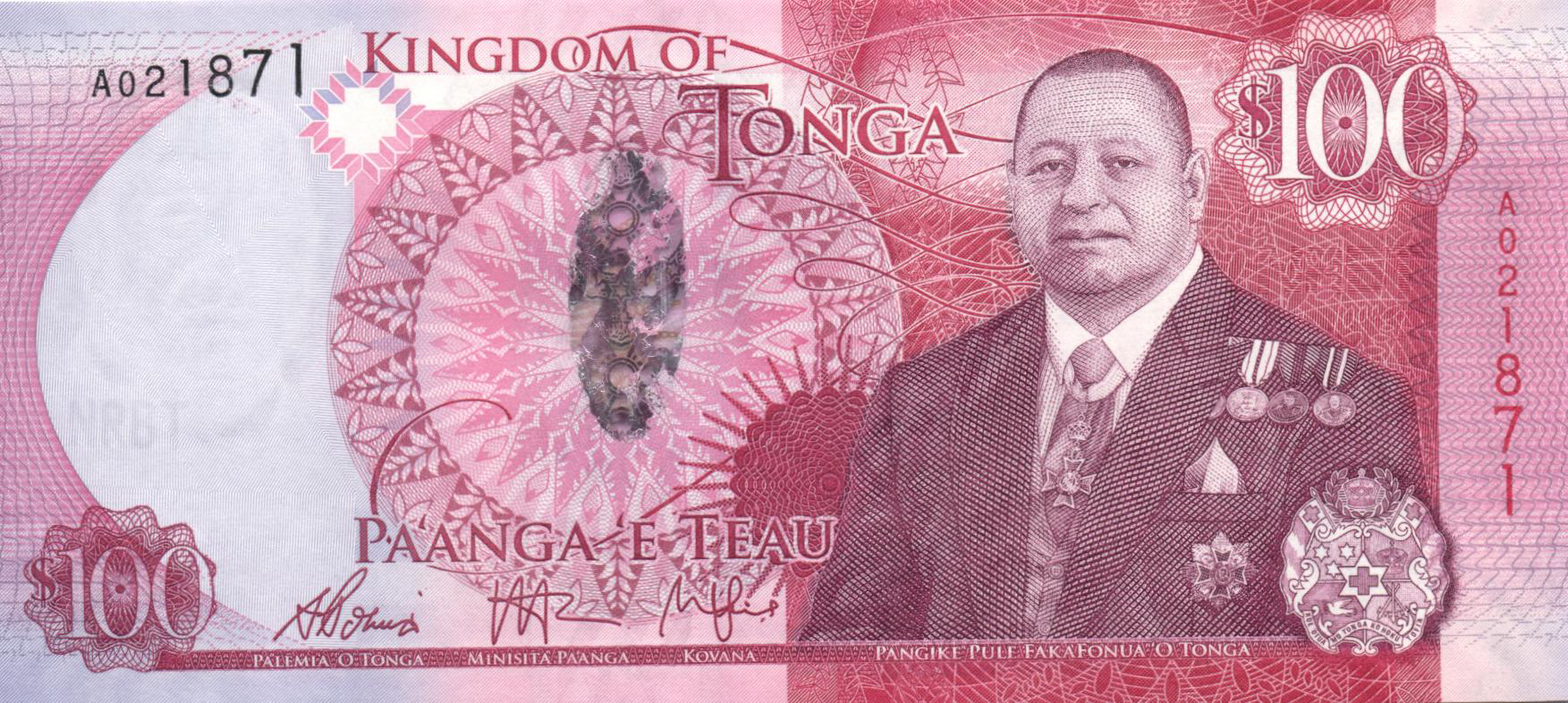
Tonga's 100 paanga banknote in De La Rue's Optiks

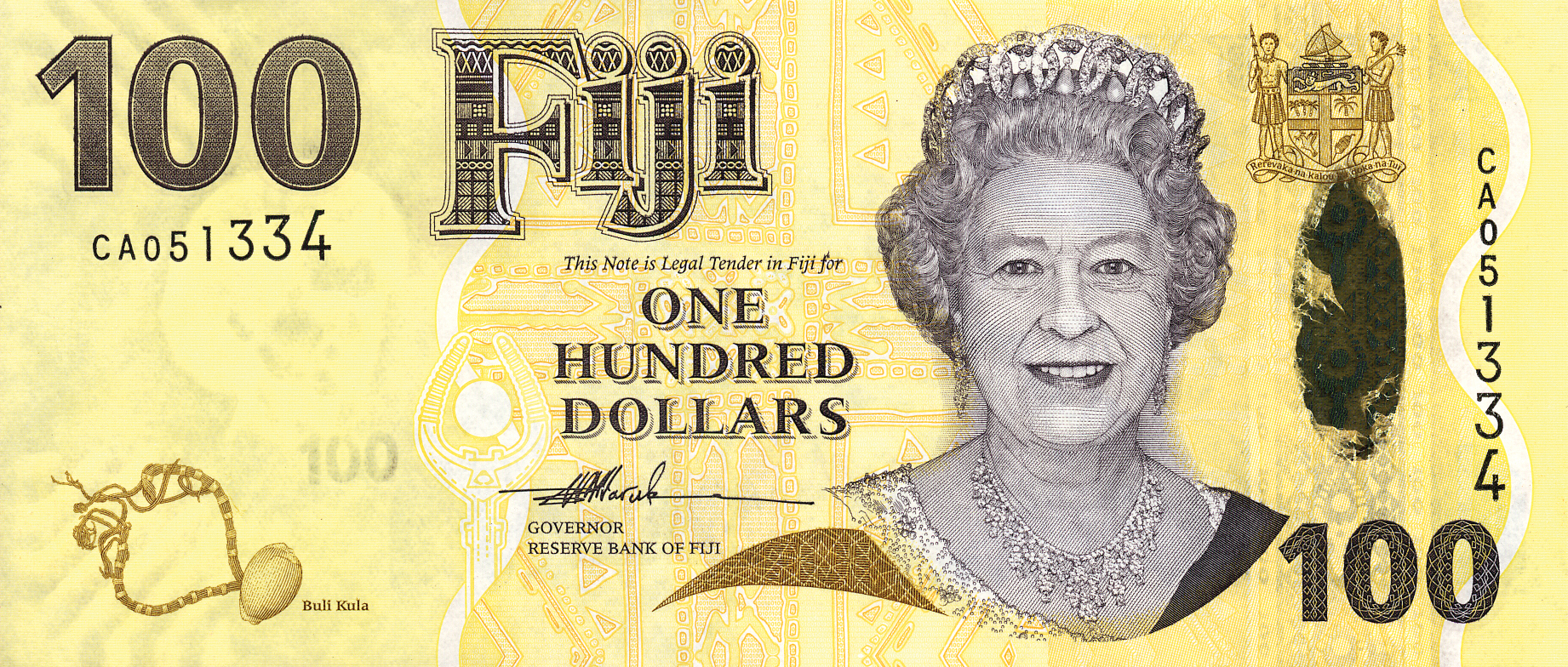
Fiji's 100 dollar in De La Rue's Optiks

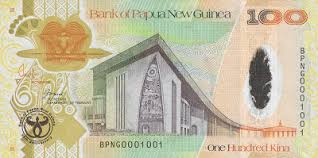
Papua new Guinea's 100 kina in De La Rue's Optiks

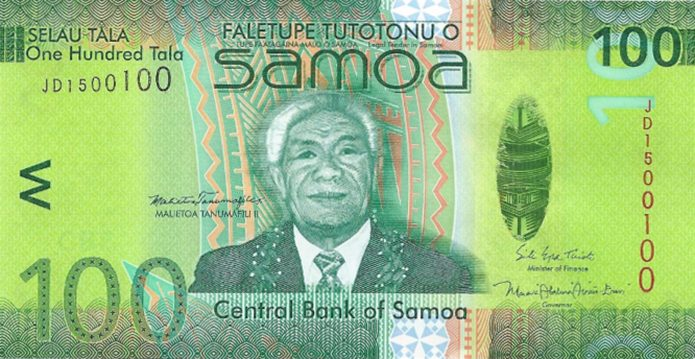
Samoa's 100 tālā in De La Rue's Optiks

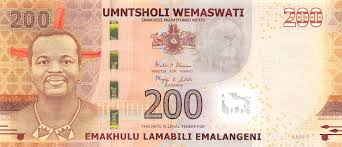
Eswatini's 200 lilageni in G+D's Hybrid

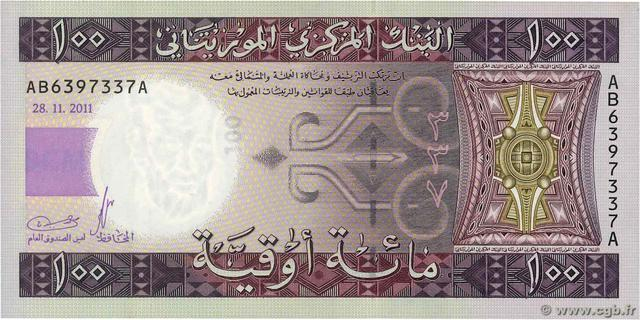
Mauritania's 100 ouguiya in G+D's Hybrid

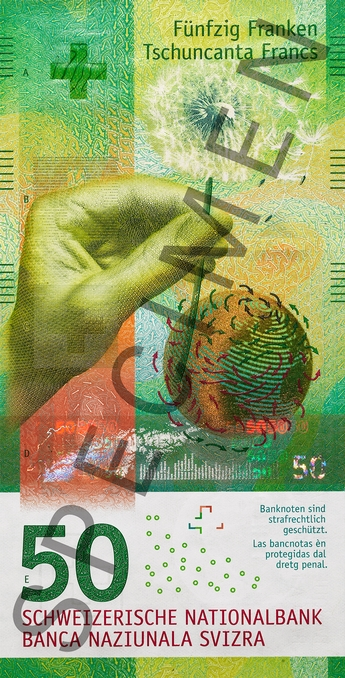
Switzerland's 9th Series 50 franc banknote in Landqart AG's DuraSafe

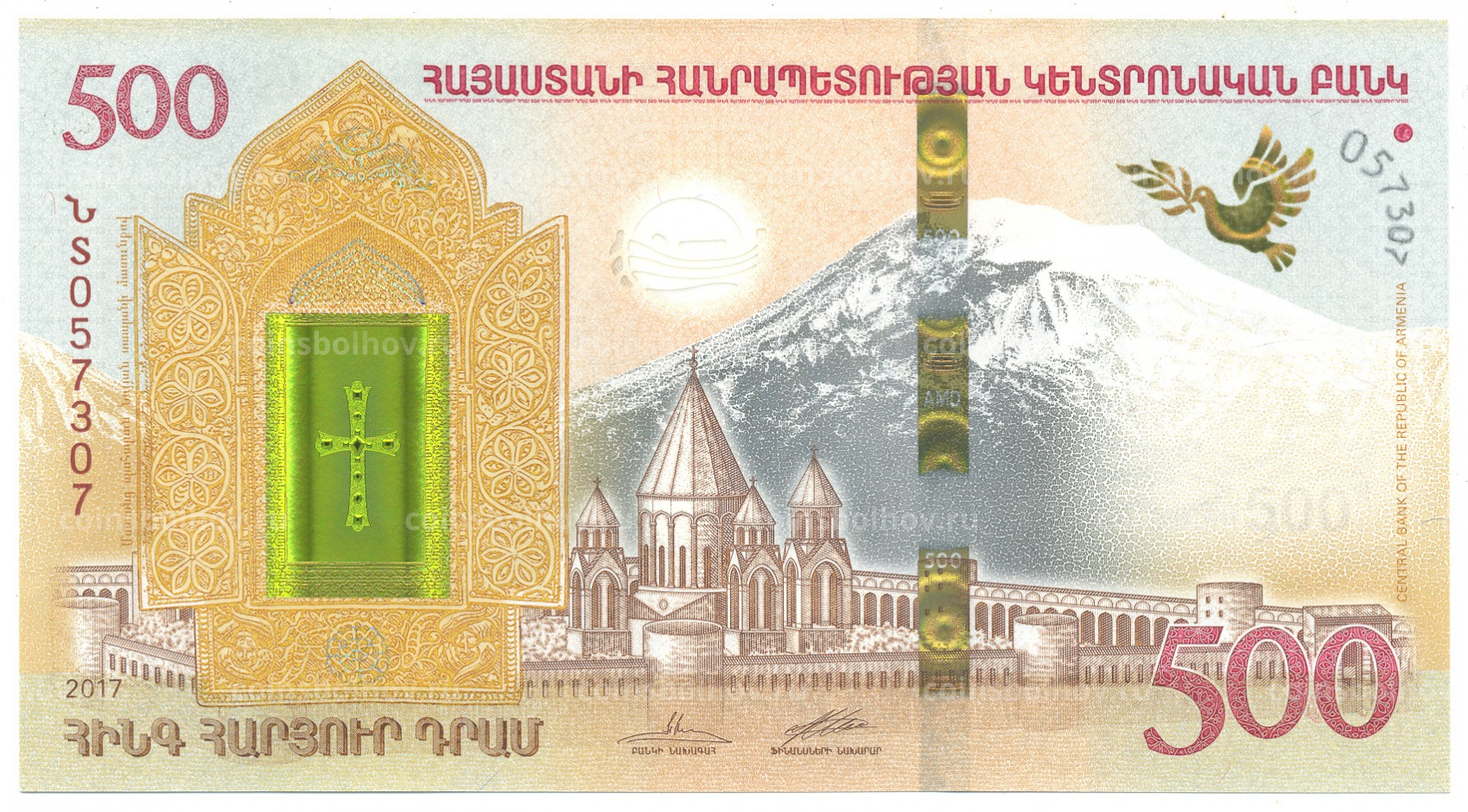
Armenia's 500 dram released to commemorate Noah's Ark

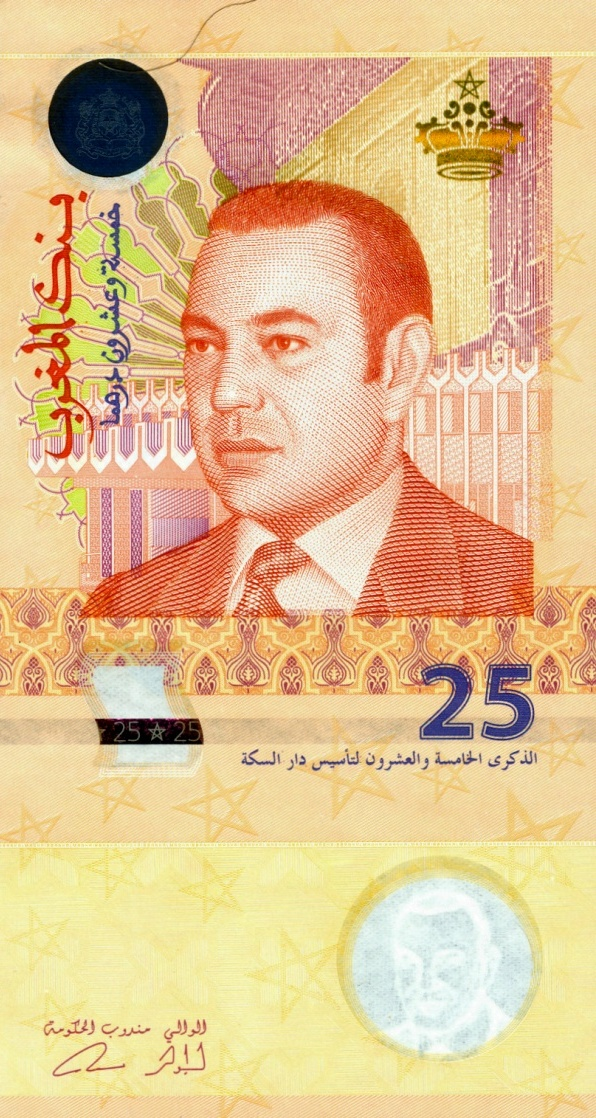
Morocco's 25 dirham produced in Landqart AG's DuraSafe
