= List of people on coins of Armenia =

This is a list of notables, mythological persons and deities on coins of Armenia.

== Artaxiad Kingdom ==
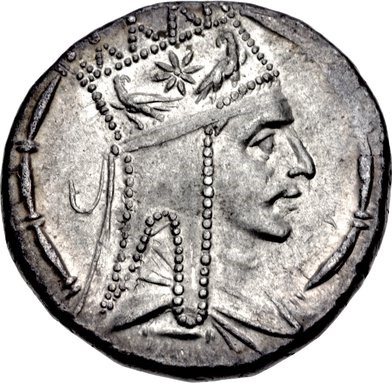
Coin of Tigranes the Great

Name	Year	Denomination	Special Notes
Artaxias I	190-159 BCE	bronze coins	The King's profile on the obverse
Artavasdes I	159-123 BCE	bronze coins	The King's profile on the obverse
Tigranes I	123-95 BCE	bronze coins	The King's profile on the obverse
Tigranes the Great	95-55 BCE	Silver and bronze coins	The King's profile on the obverse
Artavasdes II	55-34 BCE	Silver and bronze coins	The King's profile on the obverse
Artaxias II	33-20 BCE	Silver and bronze coins	The King's profile on the obverse
Tigranes III	20-10 BCE	bronze coins	The King's profile on the obverse
Tigranes IV	10-2 BCE	bronze coins	The King's profile on the obverse
Erato of Armenia		bronze coins	The Queen's profile on the obverse, also shares obverse with Tigranes IV or Tigranes V

== Kingdom of Cilicia ==
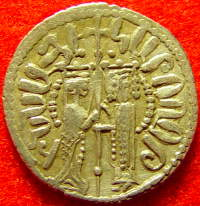
Coin of Hetoum I and Zabel

Name	Year	Denomination	Special Notes
Levon I	1129-1137	Dram	The Sovereign Prince on the obverse
Queen Zabel	1219-1252	Dram	
Hethum I, King of Armenia	1226-1269	Dram	The King on the obverse
Hethum II, King of Armenia	1289-1296	Dram	The King on the obverse
Constantine III, King of Armenia	1345-1363	Dram	The King on the obverse

== Republic of Armenia ==
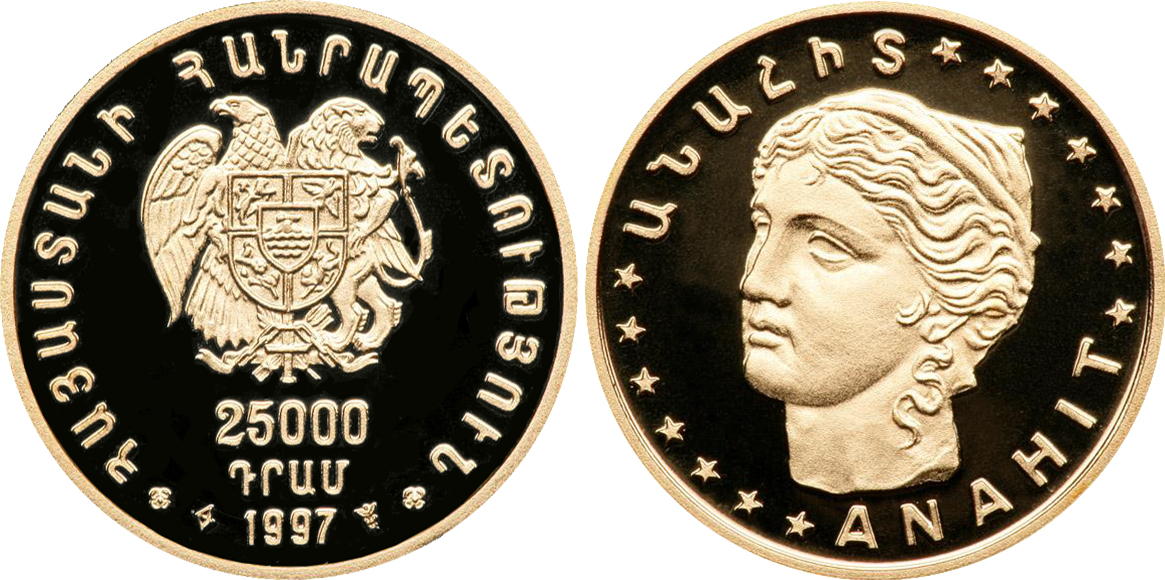
Ancient Armenian Goddess depicted on modern gold coin

Name	Year	Denomination	Special Notes
Anahit	1997	25 000 drams	Gold coin
William Saroyan	2008	10 000 drams	Gold coin, W. Saroyan's 100th Birthday
Marshal Hovhannes Bagramyan	1997	100 drams	H. Bagramyan's 100th Birthday
Saint Mary	1995	100 drams	50th Anniversary of UN; St. Mary from an old Armenian manuscript
Yeghishe Charents, Armenian poet	1997	100 drams	Y. Charents’ 100th Birthday
David of Sasun	1994	25 drams	Monument to David of Sasun in Yerevan
Aram Khachaturian	2003	100 drams	Silver coin, A. Khachaturian's 100th Anniversary

== See also ==
- Armenian dram
- Currency of Armenia
