= Armenian dram sign =

Currency sign

֏

Armenian dram sign
- In Unicode: U+058F ֏ ARMENIAN DRAM SIGN

Currency
- Currency: Armenian dram

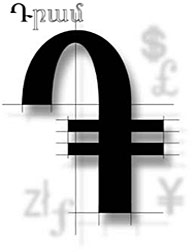
The original idea by K. Komendaryan for the dram sign shape, among other currency symbols. The Euro was not announced yet.

The Armenian dram sign (֏, image:; Armenian: Դրամ; code: AMD) is the currency sign of the Armenian dram. In Unicode, it is encoded at U+058F ֏ ARMENIAN DRAM SIGN.

After its proclamation of independence, Armenia put into circulation its own national currency, the Armenian dram, and the need for a monetary sign became immediately apparent. The shape chosen is a slightly modified version of the capital letter da (which, like the Roman D, is the fourth letter of the Armenian alphabet).

== History ==
=== Heritage of Mashtots ===
There is a strong belief that the shape of dram sign (symbol) is a direct projection of the Armenian alphabet – the work of Mesrop Mashtots. It is not hard to notice the clean-cut geometry of the Armenian letters, as did the author of the sign, K. Komendaryan, when he studied the alphabet. Later he became a proponent for the hypothesis which states that the prototype of the Armenian alphabet is a variety of combinations of the resembling curves and the horizontal elements. Subsequently, these horizontal elements played a key role in the sign development.

=== Date of creation ===
The first known usage of the sign was on 7 September 1995, when it was used in handwritten notes for the cash flow of a start-up company. Although a number of artists and businessmen developed and offered alternate designs for it, the original form has remained in use. It is now part of the Armenian standard for national characters and symbols and in Armenian computer fonts.

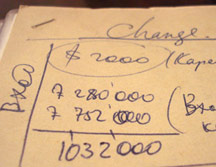
One of the first records of exchange of Armenian currency, AMD being exchanged at the rate of 516 dram/USD.

=== Incentives ===
The objective of the sign is to symbolize the Armenian national currency and come in handy wherever a graphical symbol for the currency is in demand, for instance in: financial documents, price-lists and tags, currency exchange displays, computer fonts, correspondence, etc.

At the time of the sign's development were outlined the definite fundamental criteria for it, namely the sign has:

- to denote the Armenian National Currency by graphical means;
- to recall the outlines of Armenian letters;
- to include the elements typical for the foreign monetary symbols;
- to be easily reproduced with a few strokes;
- to be enough plain for its identification and memorizing.

=== Present to Republic ===
In 2001, Komendaryan took the opportunity to give the sign to the Republic of Armenia in connection with the celebration of the 1700th anniversary of the proclamation of Christianity as Armenia's state religion. The proposal for the sign was mailed to the then President of Armenia, Robert Kocharyan. At the same time congratulations on the anniversary, together with a copy of the proposal, were sent to the Catholicos of all Armenians, Garegin II.

=== CBA contest ===
From the office of the President, the proposal has been forwarded to the Central Bank of Armenia (CBA), which announced the contest, entertained the offer among the other proposals and approved it together with the other similar design. The CBA Panel Ordinance declared to "accept the designs of dram symbol presented by K. Komendaryan and R. Arutchyan ... and pass it to the state organizations for the official processing and standardization."

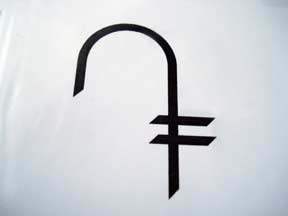
Proposal by R. Arutchyan

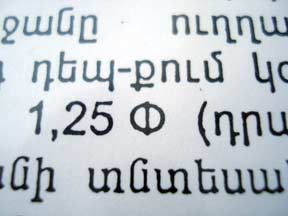
Proposal by V. Phenesyan

=== Other proposals ===
To the right are the designs for dram sign submitted to the CBA contest by an artist R. Arutchyan and an architect V. Phenesyan respectively. The proposal by R. Arutchyan cognates with Euro sign elements. In its turn, the proposal by Phenesyan is based on the first letter of Armenian word Փող (money, pronounced as "phokh").

=== Placement on Armenian dram bills and a coin ===
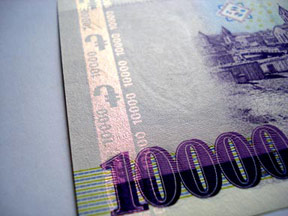
10,000 Dram bill

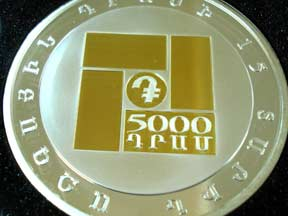
5000 Dram Coin

1000 Dram Bill

For the very first time, the original shape of the sign was depicted on the Armenian banknote in 2003, specifically on the reverse side of the 10,000 Armenian dram bill, which has been reissued in 2006 and 2008. In 2008, in connection with the celebration of the 15th anniversary of the Armenian currency was issued 5000 dram Commemorative coin with the dram sign on the reverse side of the coin. In 2011, the sign has been placed on the 1000 dram bill.

== Shape and status ==
The graphics of the dram sign was developed on the basis of the shape of the first letter of Armenian word "Դրամ" (money, pronounced as "dram") and the two horizontal strokes, found in a range of well-known monetary signs. As a result, this sign combines its Armenian origin and the two strokes present in the majority of foreign monetary symbols. The meaning of those two strokes was researched by the author and is being presented in his lectures.

=== Copyright and national attributes ===
To ensure protection of authorship the author has sent requests to the Armenian National Standards Institute in 1997 and the Copyright Bureau of the U.S. Library of Congress in 2001. However, Article 6 of Law on Copyright and Neighboring Rights adopted by the National Assembly of Armenia on 8 December 1999 and revised on 15 June 2006, asserts that state emblems and signs are not considered as objects for copyright. Hence, the dram symbol may be treated as one of the national attributes, the mandatory items of which are flag, national seal, anthem, and money.

=== Standardization ===
There are the international and republican standards pertinent to money and monetary symbols:

- ISO 4217, Codes for the Representation of Currencies and Funds – defines the format of three-letter abbreviation for world monetary instruments. It assigned the code AMD to the Armenian dram.
- Arm. Stand. 34.001-2006, Character Sets and Keyboards – defines Armenian characters encoding and keyboard layouts. The code for the sign is 91 and shorthand is 'armdram'.
- Unicode 6.1 and ISO/IEC 10646, Joint standardization for coding multilingual text.

In 2007, the Armenian National Institute for Standardization, Measurements and Metrology made an amendment to the Character Sets and Keyboards table and enacted to replace the collocation "dram sign" by the graphics of the symbol.

On 15 June 2011, the Unicode Technical Committee (UTC) accepted the dram sign for inclusion in the future versions of the Unicode Standard and assigned a code for the sign - U+058F (֏). In 2012, the sign was finally adopted in the Armenian block of ISO and Unicode international standards.

=== Variations of design ===
On creation of the dram symbol's original shape a number of designs for it were developed to conform to the most popular font styles and their derivatives (italic, bold). In 2001, the designs together with the original shape were given to the Republic as templates for national font sets. Below are presented three main templates; however, there is now a variety of sign shapes in Armenian computer fonts.

Similar to Arial fontstyle, 2001, K.K.

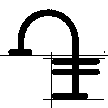
Similar to Courier fontstyle, 2001. K.K.

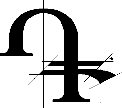
Similar to Times fontstyle, 2001, K.K.

In 2008, under the auspices of the Ministry of Culture of Armenia and Microsoft-Armenia in National Book Chamber of Armenia took place "Granshan 2008" first competition for the complete set of Armenian letters and characters, which embraced the sign together with the other characters and symbols.

== Promotion ==
Official presentations of the sign were made by its designer at the Central Bank of Armenia and at the first Congress of Armenian Technologies (ArmTech 2007) in San Francisco. The designer also arranged several lectures in Armenia, including at the Armenian State University of Economics.

In connection with celebration of the 15th Anniversary of Armenian dram, in November 2008, the Central Bank of Armenia issued a 5000 dram commemorative coin with the sign on the reverse side just against Noah's Ark with the National Coat of Arms on its obverse. The same year the sign was widely populated in a number of local periodicals. In 2011, the dram sign appeared on the renewed official site of the CBA and in the design of its new Visitors Center.

The complete information on the sign, together with the considerations on its usage has been presented at Granshan'12 and Wikipedia international conferences, both devoted to the 500th Anniversary of Armenian book printing.

== See also ==
- Currency of Armenia
- Currency symbol
