= Lusakert Biogas Plant =

Biogas plant in Armenia

- Country: Armenia
- Location: Kotayk Marz
- Status: Operational

Thermal power station
- Primary fuel: Biogas

Power generation
- Nameplate capacity: 0.85 MW
- Annual net output: 7 GWh

Lusakert Biogas Plant (LBP) is a biogas plant in Nor Geghi, about 26 kilometres (16 mi) north of Yerevan, Armenia. It generates electricity by combustion of biogas produced from animal manure of the Lusakert Pedigree Poultry Plant. The LBP started its operations in October 2008.

== History ==
The project was proposed and carried out by the Max Concern (Armenia) and Vekst Foundation (Norway). The construction of the plant started in August 2007 and was finished a year later. In the sphere of clean development, Lusakert Biogas Plant was the first in Armenia. It was registered in UN in September 2006, in the framework of Kyoto Protocol. Since the LBP implies future potential renewable energy projects, it is significant for the development of renewable energy industry in Armenia.

Lusakert Biogas Plant was awarded National Energy Globe Award Armenia (overall winner) in 2007

== Technical description ==
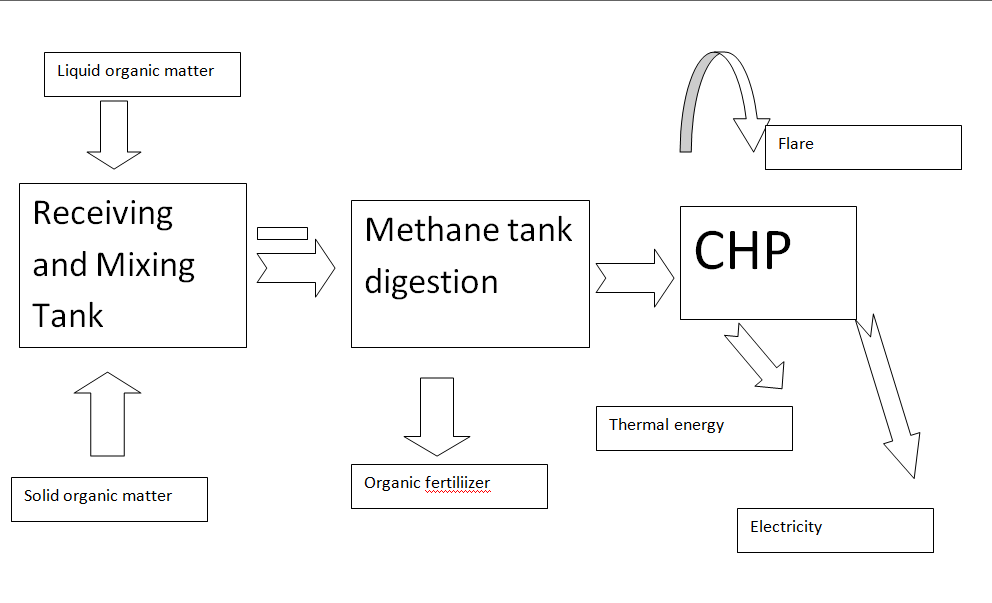
The structure of LBP–scheme describes how the LBP operates

The Lusaker Biogas Plant generates heat and electricity from biogas produced from poultry manure of the Lusakert Pedigree Poultry Plant. For production of biogas, the liquid manure is processed in an anaerobic digesters of 2,200 cubic metres (78,000 cu ft) at temperature of 38 °C (100 °F). There is an option to build the second digester. The LBP was considered to produce 5,280 cubic metres per day (186,000 cu ft/d) of biogas with a methane (CH_{4}) content of 70%. Remains of manure are used for production of 75,000 tonnes of organic fertilizer per year. After removing sulfuric acid from gas, it is used for heat and power generation. The LBP has installed electric capacity of 0.85 MW and it is able to generate 7 GWh of electricity annually. The average capacity that Lusakert Biogas Plant runs with is 50-60%. The electricity produced at LBP is sold at 40 drams (about 7.5 cents) per kilowatt. In 2014, the plant did not generate electricity due to economic difficulties of the poultry plant which resulted in low amounts of wastes.

The project duration is 21 years.

== Impact ==
It was planned that Lusakert Biogas Plant reduces greenhouse gas emissions to the atmosphere 63,000 tonnes per year of CO_{2} equivalent. In 2008–2011, the plant decreased almost 37000 tons of CO_{2} emissions to the atmosphere. It reduces local pollution of ground and water as well. LBP helps the local inhabitants to get rid of the disgusting smell of poultry emissions.

== Shareholders ==
The largest shareholders of Lusakert Biogas Plant are Max Concern (the owner of Lusakert Pedigree Poultry Plant - 58%), Vekst Foundation (Norway - 16%), the Danish Development Fund and Bigadan (Denmark) - both 13%.
