= Paruyr Sevak =

Armenian and Soviet writer, poet and literary critic (1924–1971)

Paruyr Sevak Պարույր Սևակ
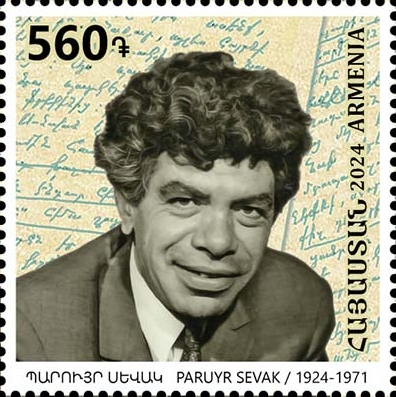
- Sevak on a 2024 stamp of Armenia
- Born: Paruyr Ghazaryan; January 24, 1924; Chanakhchi, Transcaucasian SFSR, Soviet Union
- Died: June 17, 1971 (aged 47); Yerevan, Armenian SSR, Soviet Union
- Resting place: Zangakatun, Armenia
- Occupation: Poet
- Spouse(s): Maya Avagyan, Nelli Menagharishvili
- Writing career
- Period: 1940s–1970s
- Notable works: "We Are Few But We Are Called Armenians," "The Unsilenceable Belfry," "Man in a Palm," "Immortals Command"

Sevak reading one of his most famous poems Live, live (Ապրե՜լ, ապրե՜լ)

Paruyr Sevak (Armenian: Պարույր Սևակ; January 24, 1924 – June 17, 1971) was an Armenian poet, translator and literary critic. A major figure in Soviet Armenia during the Khrushchev Thaw, Sevak and his works remain widely popular in Armenia today. He is considered one of the greatest Armenian poets of the 20th century.

== Early career ==
Sevak was born Paruyr Ghazaryan (Armenian: Պարույր Ղազարյան) in the village of Chanakhchi (now Zangakatun), Armenian SSR, Soviet Union to Rafael and Anahit Soghomonyan on January 24, 1924. (Note: Sevak's date of birth is incorrectly recorded as January 26 in various sources and official documents. Since he was born during the mourning ceremonies following the death of Vladimir Lenin, his birth was recorded two days late.) (Note: Instead of receiving his father's surname, Soghomonyan, Paruyr received the surname Ghazaryan, formed from his paternal grandfather's given name.) His ancestors had migrated to Chanakhchi, a remote, mountainous village, from the village of Havtvan in Salmast (Salmas), Iran in 1828. Young Paruyr attended the village school, where he wrote his first poems and published them in the school wall newspaper. Sevak spent part of his childhood and adolescence in a location called Navchalu yayla (Note: Yayla is a word of Turkic origin meaning 'highland' or 'mountain pasture'.) near his native village; in his early writings, he signed his writings with 'Navchalu' as the location where they were written. In 1939, he became a student at the philological faculty of Yerevan State University. He graduated in 1945. The same year he started his postgraduate studies in Armenian literature at the Abeghyan Institute of Literature of the Armenian SSR Academy of Sciences, which lasted until 1948. In 1951, Sevak went to Moscow to study at the Gorky Institute of World Literature.

== Thaw and literary work ==
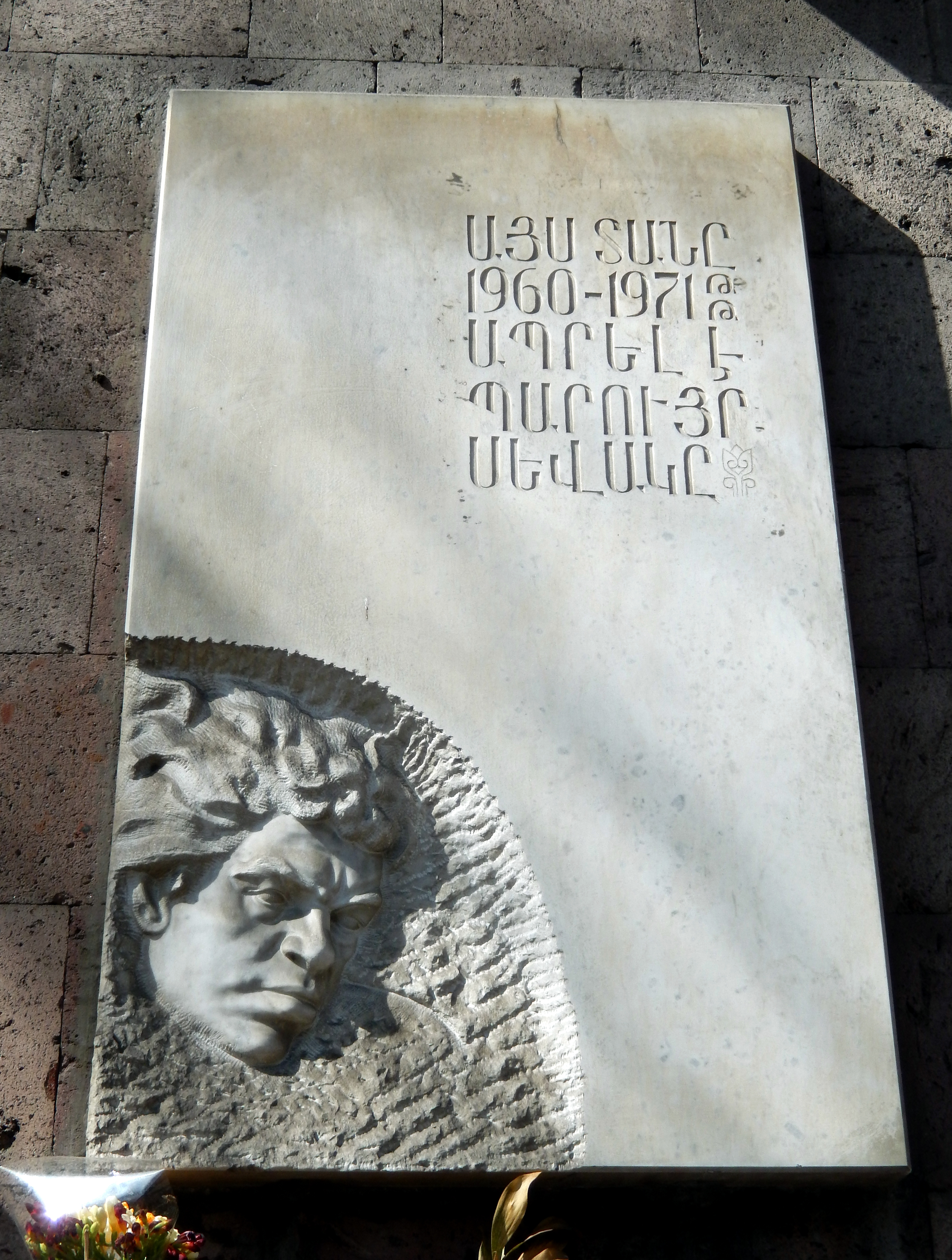
Plaque marking the building where Paruyr Sevak lived on Kasyan Street in Yerevan

After graduation from the Gorky Institute, Sevak worked there as a professor of translation in 1957–59, at the height of Nikita Khrushchev's Thaw. In 1959, he authored the long poem Anlr’eli zangakatunë (The Unsilenceable Belfry or The Incessant Bell-tower) [hy], a work dedicated to Armenian composer Komitas and to the memory of the Armenian genocide.

In 1960, Sevak moved back to Yerevan where he resumed his prolific literary, scientific, and public career. He returned to the Abeghyan Institute, this time as a scientific researcher. In 1966, Sevak signed a petition supporting the unification of Nagorno-Karabakh with Soviet Armenia, alongside Martiros Saryan, Yervand Kochar, Hamo Sahyan, and other major Armenian cultural figures.

From 1966 to 1971, Sevak served as secretary on the Board of the Writers Union of Armenia. In 1967, he became a doctor of philology after his dissertation defense. In 1968, Sevak was elected to the Supreme Soviet of the Armenian SSR.

== Death and legacy ==
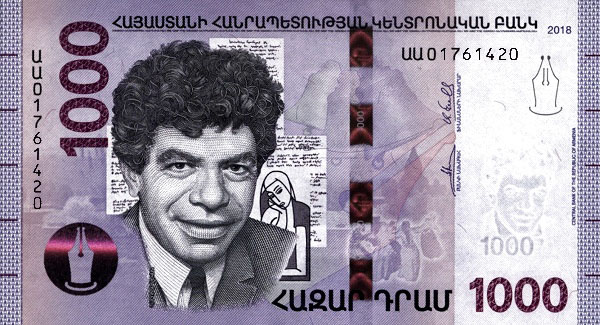
Paruyr Sevak on a 2018 1000 Dram banknote

Sevak died on June 17, 1971, in a car crash while on a drive back to Yerevan. In previous years, he had voiced his criticism of the cultural policies of the Soviet government and for this, many Armenians believe, he was murdered by the Soviet government. His wife, Nelly Menagharishvili, also died in the car crash.

Sevak was buried in the backyard of his home, in Zangakatun, which later became a museum open to the public. One of the main streets of Yerevan's Kanaker-Zeytun District is named after him. School #123 of Yerevan is also named after Sevak. In 1984, Levon Mkrtchyan directed the film Paruyr Sevak for Armenfilm. On 2018, the third series of Dram banknotes were printed, featuring Sevak on the 1000 Dram note.

== Publications ==
- (1948) Anmahnerë hramayum en (Անմահները հրամայում են (The immortals command))
- (1953) Anhasht mtermut’yun (Անհաշտ մտերմություն (Irreconcilable intimacy))
- (1954) Siro chanaparh (Սիրո ճանապարհ (Path of love))
- (1969) Yeghits’i luys (Եղիցի լույս (Let there be light)
- (1971) Dzer tsanot’nerë (Ձեր ծանոթները (Your acquaintances))
- (1972–1976) Yerkeri zhoghovatsu vets’ hatorov (Երկերի ժողովածու վեց հատորով (Collected works in six volumes))
- (1982–1983) Yerker: zhoghovatsu yerek’ hatorov (Երկեր ։ ժողովածու երեք հատորով (Collected works in three volumes))

=== Translations into English ===
- Selected Poems. Translated with an introduction by Garig Basmadjian. Jerusalem: St. James Press, 1973.
- Paruyr Sevak's Poetry: Select Translations from Armenian. Translated by Jack Aslanian. Yerevan: VMV-Print, 2011.
- The Incessant Bell-tower. Translated by Svetlana Vardanian. Yerevan: Limush Press, 2015 (2nd revised ed.: 2017).
