= Garig Basmadjian =

- Գարիկ Բասմաջյան
- Born: 20 December 1947; Jerusalem
- Died: July 29, 1989 (aged 41); Moscow, Soviet Union
- Citizenship: Israel; France
- Occupations: Poet, gallerist, translator, collector, writer

Garig Basmadjian was a well-known French collector of paintings and antiques of Armenian origin. He was the owner of the "Gorky" gallery of Russian art on the Parisian Boulevard Raspail (Boulevard Raspail) (now the gallery is managed by his sister). He was also a poet and translator of poetry.

He disappeared in July 1989 in Moscow.

== Biography ==
He was born on December 20, 1947 in the Armenian quarter of Jerusalem.

He received his higher education in Yerevan, graduating from Yerevan State University with a degree in philology. In 1972, Garig Basmadjian met a French woman of Armenian origin in Yerevan and soon married her. In the same year, the newlyweds moved to Paris.

Basmadjian translated poetry from Armenian into English, and from European languages into Russian and Armenian. He wrote his own poems. A collection of his poems was published in the USSR.

The collector organized his first exhibition, dedicated to the works of Armenian painters, in 1978, in a small rented space. In 1978 he organized his first gallery "Galerie Basmadjian" in Montparnasse. In the gallery he demonstrated contemporary Soviet painting to European collectors. In 1981, Basmadjian exhibited all his acquisitions in his personal gallery of Russian art "Gorky" opened on Boulevard Raspail, which he named in honor of the Armenian abstract artist Arshile Gorky.

Basmadjian became known for his exhibitions in Moscow, Leningrad, and Europe; his collection of antiques; and his work with contemporary Soviet artists, especially Russian and Armenian ones. Basmadjian's gallery sold individual paintings to the Centre Pompidou.

Some time later, Basmadjian established ties with the Soviet Ministry of Culture; the gallerist helped buy paintings by Russian masters at a fair price and return them to the USSR.

Basmadjian visited the USSR repeatedly, bringing paintings from his collection to the Hermitage and the Tretyakov Gallery, and he donated some items to museums free of charge. In April 1988, Basmadjian and the Soviet Ministry of Culture reached an agreement to organize exhibitions in the Hermitage and the Tretyakov Gallery of paintings he owned.

He also set up a business selling computers in the USSR.

Basmadjian's last visit to the USSR took place in the summer of 1989: first, he wanted to collect his property from the Hermitage, and he also planned to formalize a donation to the Hermitage and discuss the sale to the Soviet Union of the painting Portrait of D. S. Yakovleva by Vladimir Borovikovsky.

On 29 July 1989, Garig left the Rossiya Hotel in Moscow with an unknown companion "for negotiations", got into his beige Zhiguli, drove off, and disappeared. It is presumed that Basmadjian was abducted and then murdered. Crime boss Oleg Asmakov (known as Asmak, Alik Magadan and Alex Taim) and the Soviet antique mafia were suspected of his murder; there were also suspicions and witnesses claiming that the KGB was involved. His fate was unsuccessfully investigated by KGB operatives, the French police (whose head, Pierre Fauqueux, personally came to the USSR for this purpose), and the best private detectives from London. This was the first high-profile disappearance of a public figure from the art world and of a French citizen during Perestroika.

On July 12, 2022, journalist Seva Kaplan, known for his interviews with multiple Russian mobsters, claimed, citing an anonymous source, that Basmadjian's body was passed through a meat grinder to dispose of it, and that the killing was the first murder committed by the Solntsevskaya Bratva, allegedly carried out by Oleg Asmakov.
