= Armenian dram =

Currency of Armenia

հայկական դրամ (Armenian)
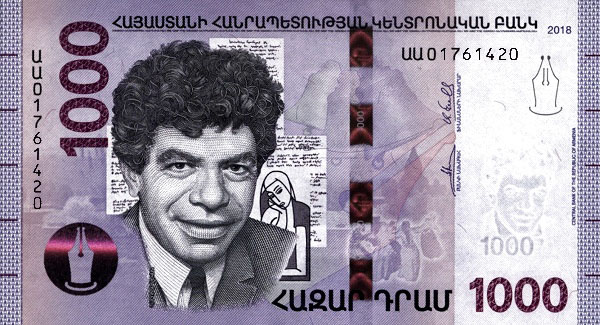

ISO 4217
- Code: AMD (numeric: 051)
- Subunit: 0.01

Units of account
- Plural: The language(s) of this currency do(es) not have a morphological plural distinction.
- Symbol: ֏
- Subunit
- 1/100: luma (լումա)

Denominations
- Banknotes
- Freq. used: ֏1,000, ֏2,000, ֏5,000, ֏10,000, ֏20,000, ֏50,000
- Rarely used: ֏50, ֏100, ֏500, ֏100,000
- Coins
- Freq. used: ֏10, ֏20, ֏50, ֏100, ֏200, ֏500
- Rarely used: 10, 20, 50 luma, ֏1, ֏3, ֏5

Demographics
- Date of introduction: 22 November 1993
- Replaced: Soviet rouble (SUR)
- Official user(s): Armenia
- Unofficial user: Georgia: Javakheti (Javakhk) region (de facto until c. 2005)

Issuance
- Central bank: Central Bank of Armenia
- Website: cba.am

Valuation
- Inflation: -0.6%
- Source: , December 2023

The Armenian dram (Armenian: դրամ; sign: ֏; abbreviation: դր.; ISO code: AMD) is the currency of Armenia. It was historically subdivided into 100 luma (լումա). The Central Bank of Armenia is responsible for issuance and circulation of dram banknotes and coins, as well as implementing the monetary policy of Armenia.

The word dram means "money" and is cognate with the Greek drachma and the Arabic dirham, as well as the English weight unit dram.

== History ==
The first instance of a "dram" currency was in the period from 1199 to 1375, when silver coins called dram or tram were issued. Dram or Takvorin coinage would periodically continue to be produced for some time until the loss of Armenia's independence. The establishment of Russian Armenia saw the adoption of the Imperial ruble, followed by a series of attempts to localize the Russian ruble under the Soviet Union and Commonwealth of Independent States (CIS). On 21 September 1991, a national referendum proclaimed Armenia as a republic independent from the Soviet Union. The Central Bank of Armenia, established on 27 March 1993, was given the exclusive right of issuing the national currency.

In the immediate aftermath of the collapse of the Soviet Union, attempts were made to maintain a common currency (the Russian rouble) among CIS states. Armenia joined this rouble zone. However it soon became clear that maintaining a currency union in the unstable political and economical circumstances of the post-Soviet states would be very difficult. The Rouble Zone effectively collapsed with the unilateral 1993 Russian monetary reform process. As a result, the remaining CIS participants – Kazakhstan, Uzbekistan, Turkmenistan, Moldova, Armenia and Georgia – were 'pushed out' and forced to introduce separate currencies. Armenia was one of the last countries to do so when it introduced the dram on 22 November 1993.

=== Armenian dram sign ===
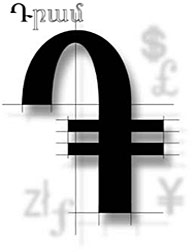
The dram sign

As the result of common business practice and the unique pattern of Armenian letters, the shape of the sign and its variations appeared in the business scratches (daybooks). Until the official endorsement of the sign a number of artists and businessmen developed and offered various shapes for it. Now the dram symbol is included in the Armenian standard for the national characters and symbols and in the Armenian computer fonts. The current standard sign for the Armenian dram (֏, image:; Armenian: Դրամ; code: AMD) was designed in 1995. In Unicode, it is encoded at U+058F ֏ ARMENIAN DRAM SIGN.

== Coins ==
In 1994, a first series of aluminium coins was introduced in denominations of 10, 20, and 50 luma, 1, 3, 5, and 10 drams. In 2003 and 2004, a second series consisting of 10, 20, 50, 100, 200 and 500 dram coins was introduced to replace the first series.

The Central Bank has also issued a great number of commemorative coins intended for sale to collectors. A listing can be found at the authorized central bank distributors.

=== First series (1994–2002) ===
In 1994, a first series of aluminium coins was introduced in denominations of 10, 20, and 50 luma, 1, 3, 5, and 10 drams. The other coins are officially in circulation but rarely used because of their low nominal value.

First series (1994)
| Image | | Value | Technical parameters | | | Description | | |
| Obverse | Reverse | Value | Diameter | Mass | Composition | Edge | Obverse | Reverse |
|---|---|---|---|---|---|---|---|---|
| | | 10 luma | 16 mm | 0.6 g | Aluminium | Smooth | Armenian coat of arms | Value, year of minting |
| | | 20 luma | 18 mm | 0.75 g | Aluminium | Smooth | Armenian coat of arms | Value, year of minting |
| | | 50 luma | 20 mm | 0.95 g | Aluminium | Smooth | Armenian coat of arms | Value, year of minting |
| | | ֏1 | 22 mm | 1.4 g | Aluminium | Reeded | Armenian coat of arms | Value, year of minting |
| | | ֏3 | 24 mm | 1.65 g | Aluminium | Reeded | Armenian coat of arms | Value, year of minting |
| | | ֏5 | 26 mm | 2 g | Aluminium | Smooth | Armenian coat of arms | Value, year of minting |
| | | ֏10 | 28 mm | 2.3 g | Aluminium | Smooth | Armenian coat of arms | Value, year of minting |
These images are to scale at 2.5 pixels per millimetre. For table standards, see the coin specification table.

- All coins bear the year of the first issue (1994).

=== Second series (2003–present) ===
In 2003 and 2004, a new series of coins was introduced in denominations of 10, 20, 50, 100, 200 and 500 drams.

Second series (2003-2004)
| Image | | Value | Technical parameters | | | Description | | |
| Obverse | Reverse | Value | Diameter | Mass | Composition | Edge | Obverse | Reverse |
|---|---|---|---|---|---|---|---|---|
| | | ֏10 | 20 mm | 1.3 g | Aluminium | Reeded | Armenian coat of arms | Value, ornaments, year of minting |
| | | ֏20 | 20.5 mm | 2.75 g | Copper-plated Steel | Smooth | Armenian coat of arms | Value, ornaments, year of minting |
| | | ֏50 | 21.5 mm | 3.45 g | Brass-plated steel | Reeded | Armenian coat of arms | Value, ornaments, year of minting |
| | | ֏100 | 22.5 mm | 4 g | Nickel-plated Steel | Reeded | Armenian coat of arms | Value, ornaments, year of minting |
| | | ֏200 | 24 mm | 4.5 g | Brass | Reeded | Armenian coat of arms | Value, ornaments, year of minting |
| | | ֏500 | 22 mm | 5 g | Bi-Metallic Copper-nickel center in Brass ring | Segmented reeding | Armenian coat of arms | Value, ornaments, year of minting |
These images are to scale at 2.5 pixels per millimetre. For table standards, see the coin specification table.

- All coins bear the year of the first issue (2003 or 2004).

== Banknotes ==
A first series of banknotes was issued in November 1993. It was withdrawn from circulation by 2005. A second series was issued from 1998 onwards which is still in use at present.

=== First series (1993–1998) ===
On 22 November 1993, banknotes of 10, 25, 50, 100, 200, and 500 drams were issued. Notes for ֏1,000 and ֏5,000 were put into circulation later.

First series (1993–1998)
| Image | | Value | Dimensions | Main Color | Description | |
| Obverse | Reverse | Value | Dimensions | Main Color | Obverse | Reverse |
|---|---|---|---|---|---|---|
| | | ֏10 | 125 x 62 mm | Brown and purple | Yerevan Train Station and David of Sasun statue | Mount Ararat |
| | | ֏25 | 125 x 62 mm | Yellow, brown and blue | Urartian cuneiform tablet and a lion relief from Erebuni fortress | Ornaments |
| | | ֏50 | 125 x 62 mm | Blue and red | National Gallery and History Museum of Armenia | Armenian parliament building |
| | | ֏100 | 125 x 62 mm | Blue, purple and red | Mount Ararat and Zvartnots Cathedral | Yerevan Opera Theatre |
| | | ֏200 | 135 x 62 mm | Brown, green, yellow and red | Saint Hripsime Church in Echmiadzin | Ornaments |
| | | ֏500 | 135 x 62 mm | Green, brown and blue | Mount Ararat and a Tigranes the Great tetradrachm | Ornaments |
| | | ֏1,000 | 145 x 68 mm | Brown and orange | Mesrop Mashtots statue and Matenadaran | 7th century obelisk monument in Aghitu Memorial |
| | | ֏5,000 | 145 x 71 mm | Green, yellow and purple | Temple of Garni | Bronze head of goddess Anahit (Satala Aphrodite) kept in the British Museum |
These images are to scale at 0.7 pixel per millimetre (18 pixel per inch). For table standards, see the banknote specification table.

=== Second series (1998–2017) ===
Banknotes of ֏50, ֏100, and ֏500 are rarely seen in circulation. Coins of ֏50, ֏100, and ֏500 are used instead.
A commemorative ֏50,000 note was issued on 4 June 2001 in commemoration of the 1,700th anniversary of the adoption of Christianity in Armenia.

Second series (1998–2017)
| Image | | Value | Dimensions | Main Color | Description | |
| Obverse | Reverse | Value | Dimensions | Main Color | Obverse | Reverse |
|---|---|---|---|---|---|---|
| | | ֏50 | 122 x 65 mm | Pink, blue and grey | Aram Khachaturian (1903–1978) and Armenian Opera Theater | A scene from the ballet Gayane by Khachaturian, and Mount Ararat |
| | | ֏100 | 122 x 65 mm | Blue and grey | Viktor Hambardzumyan (1908–1996) | Byurakan Observatory |
| | | ֏500 | 129 x 72 mm | Grey | Alexander Tamanian (1878–1936) | Government House in Yerevan designed by Alexander Tamanyan |
| | | ֏1,000 | 136 x 72 mm | Green and pink | Yeghishe Charents (1897–1937) | An image of old Yerevan depicting the government building of the First Republic |
| | | ֏5,000 | 143 x 72 mm | Yellow and green | Hovhannes Tumanyan (1869–1923) | Nature scene from Lori, from one of Martiros Saryan's paintings |
| | | ֏10,000 | 150 x 72 mm | Purple | Avetik Isahakyan (1875–1957) | An image of old Gyumri |
| | | ֏20,000 | 155 x 72 mm | Yellow, red and brown | Martiros Saryan (1880–1972) | Detail from an Armenian landscape by Martiros Saryan |
| | | ֏50,000 | 160 x 79 mm | Brown and red | Etchmiadzin Cathedral | St. Gregory the Illuminator and king Tiridates the Great holding a symbol representing the Armenian Church; on the right, a khachkar from Kecharis Monastery. |
| | | ֏100,000 | 160 x 72 mm | Blue | Abgar V of Edessa | Abgar V of Edessa receiving the mandylion from St. Thaddeus (not pictured). |
These images are to scale at 0.7 pixel per millimetre (18 pixel per inch). For table standards, see the banknote specification table.

=== 500 dram commemorative note (2017) ===
A 500 dram commemorative note was issued on 22 November 2017 to commemorate both the story of Noah's Ark and the 25th anniversary of Armenia's national currency.

commemorative note (2017)
| Image | | Value | Dimensions | Main Color | Description | |
| Obverse | Reverse | Value | Dimensions | Main Color | Obverse | Reverse |
|---|---|---|---|---|---|---|
| | | ֏500 | 140 × 76 mm | Brown and grey | Reliquary containing a fragment of Noah's Ark (left); etching by Friedrich Parrot of Etchmiadzin Cathedral with Mount Ararat in the background | Etching by Jacob Carolsfeld of Noah, his family members and animals against the background of Mount Ararat |
These images are to scale at 0.7 pixel per millimetre (18 pixel per inch). For table standards, see the banknote specification table.

=== Third series (2018–present) ===
A third series of Armenian dram banknotes was issued in 2018, All denominations for this series are the same as its previous issues, with the 2,000 dram banknote as a newly introduced denomination, the 50,000 dram banknote re-issued for this series and the omission of the 50, 100, 500, and 100,000 dram banknotes for this issue. The new series are printed on hybrid substrates of Louisenthal.

The first three denominations, ֏10,000, ֏20,000 and ֏50,000, were issued on November 22, 2018 to mark 25 years of Armenian currency. The final three denominations, ֏1,000, ֏2,000 and ֏5,000 were issued on December 25, 2018.

Third series (2018–present)
| Image | | Value | Dimensions | Main Color | Description | |
| Obverse | Reverse | Value | Dimensions | Main Color | Obverse | Reverse |
|---|---|---|---|---|---|---|
| | | ֏1,000 | 130 × 72 mm | Violet | Paruyr Sevak (1924–1971), poems | Paryur Sevak house (museum), Zangakatun; statue of Sevak |
| | | ֏2,000 | 135 × 72 mm | Brown | Tigran Petrosian (1929–1984), chessboard | Tigran Petrosian Chess House (Yerevan), statue of Petrosyan |
| | | ֏5,000 | 140 × 72 mm | Red | William Saroyan (1908–1981), covers from Saroyan's books, mountain | Statue of Saroyan (Yerevan) |
| | | ֏10,000 | 145 × 72 mm | Gray-purple | Komitas (1869–1935) | Gevorgian Seminary and statue of Komitas, Vagharshapat (Etchmiadzin) |
| | | ֏20,000 | 150 × 72 mm | Green | Ivan Aivazovsky (1817–1900) | Aivazovsky National Art Gallery Museum and statue of Aivazovskiy, Feodosia (Crimea) |
| | | ֏50,000 | 155 × 72 mm | Gold | Saint Gregory the Illuminator (257–331), manuscripts telling the life of St. Gregory, images of the dome of the Mother Cathedral of Holy Etchmiadzin and the winged cross | Khor Virap monastery (Chapel of St. Gregory), Ararat Plain, tombstone of St. Gregory the Illuminator (Etchmiadzin), statue of St. Gregory the Illuminator |
These images are to scale at 0.7 pixel per millimetre (18 pixel per inch). For table standards, see the banknote specification table.

== Exchange rates ==
The modern dram came into effect on 22 November 1993, at a rate of Rbls 200 = 1 dram (US$1 = 404 drams).

Current AMD exchange rates
| From Google Finance: | AUD CAD CHF CNY EUR GBP HKD JPY USD RUB |
| From Yahoo! Finance: | AUD CAD CHF CNY EUR GBP HKD JPY USD RUB |
| From XE.com: | AUD CAD CHF CNY EUR GBP HKD JPY USD RUB |
| From OANDA: | AUD CAD CHF CNY EUR GBP HKD JPY USD RUB |

Note: Rates obtained from these websites may be slightly different from the rates the Central Bank of Armenia publishes

== See also ==
- Artsakh dram
- Economy of Armenia
- List of currencies
- List of currencies in Europe
- List of circulating currencies
- List of people on coins of Armenia
