= Louisenthal Paper Mill =

Paper mill based in Gmund am Tegernsee

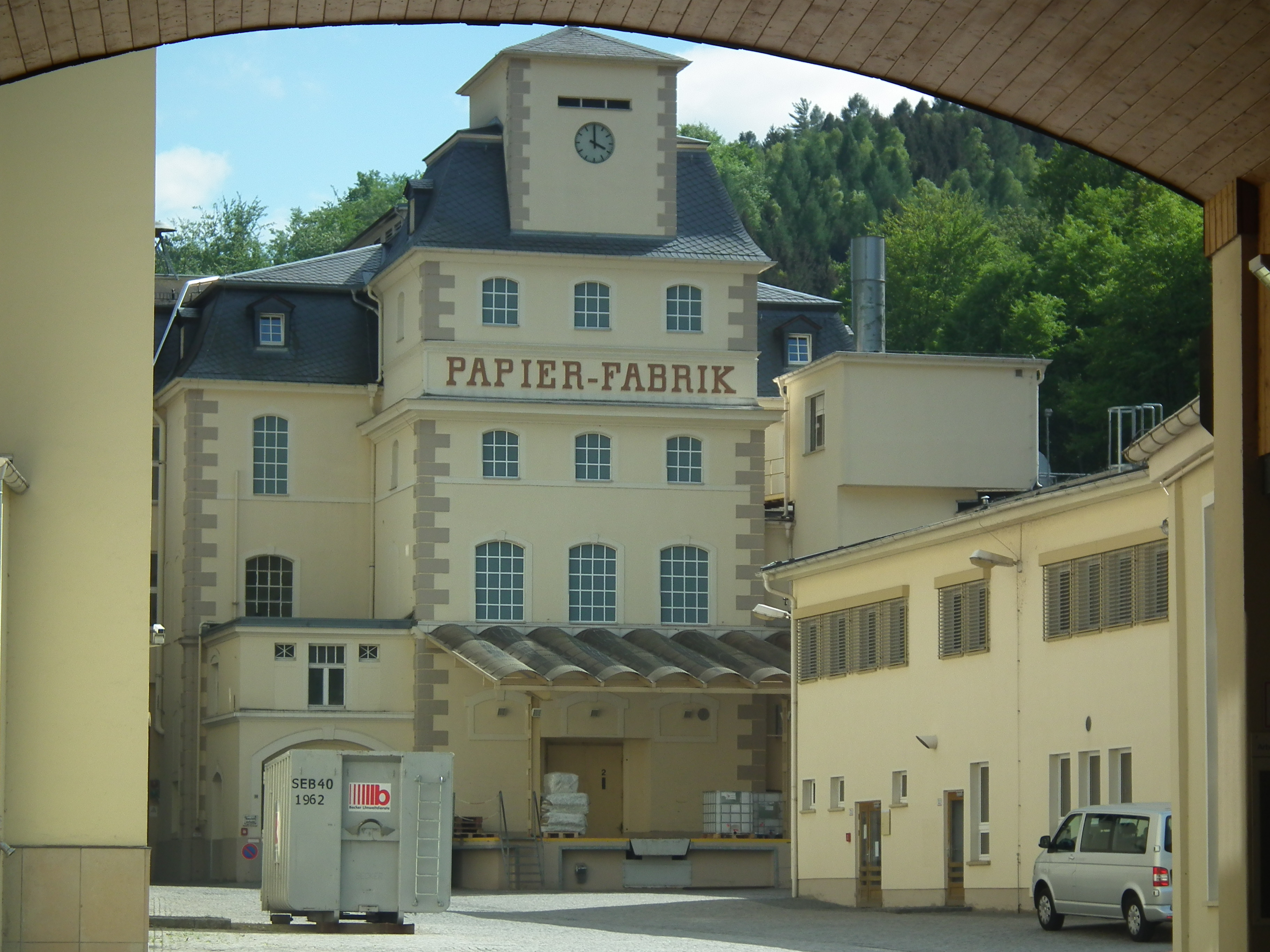
The Louisenthal Paper Mill in Königstein

The Louisenthal Paper Mill, or Papierfabrik Louisenthal (PL) in regional language, is a German manufacturer of security paper. Founded in 1878, the company has been a subsidiary of the Giesecke+Devrient company since 1964 which is best known as a German manufacturer of banknotes.

== History ==
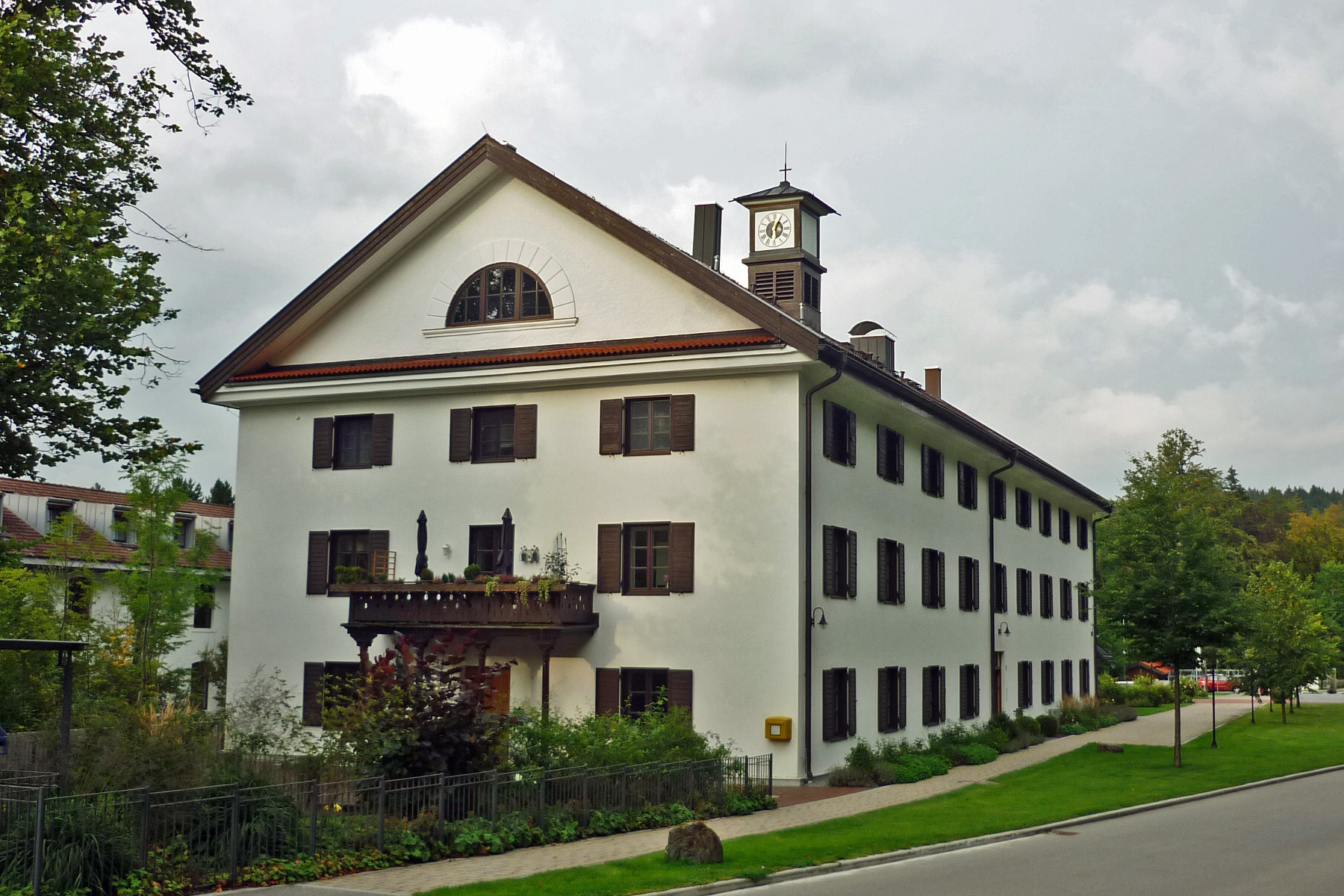
Earlier central building of Papierfabrik Louisenthal in Gmund, now Siegfried-Otto-Haus

In 1878, a paper mill was established in Gmund am Tegernsee. Since 1964, the company has been a subsidiary of Giesecke+Devrient. The company owns a second factory at Königstein, Saxony, acquired in 1991 after the German reunification.

== Manufacturing ==
The substrate bears essential security features of banknotes to protect against counterfeiting. In the early days of banknote production, security paper was equipped with real watermarks and security threads.

In 1994 the world's first banknote paper with hologram stripes was produced in Louisenthal (the 2000 leva banknote for Bulgaria). After plastic banknotes could not establish themselves on the market, the mill brought a banknote onto the market in 2008 which combined the advantages of paper and polymer banknotes.

In 2019, the company was the creator of two new technologies in a new set of banknotes by the Bulgarian National Bank, which won the Best New Banknote award given by the High Security Printing EMEA Conference in Malta.

As of 2020, the Louisenthal paper mill claims to be a leading supplier of advanced film elements as security features that produce color shifts and three-dimensional effects depending on the viewing angle.

== Production ==
Employing a workforce of around 1,100, 320 of which are located at the Königstein site near Dresden, the paper mill produces about 13,000 tons of paper per year.
