= Zangakatun =

Village in Ararat, Armenia

Zangakatun Զանգակատուն
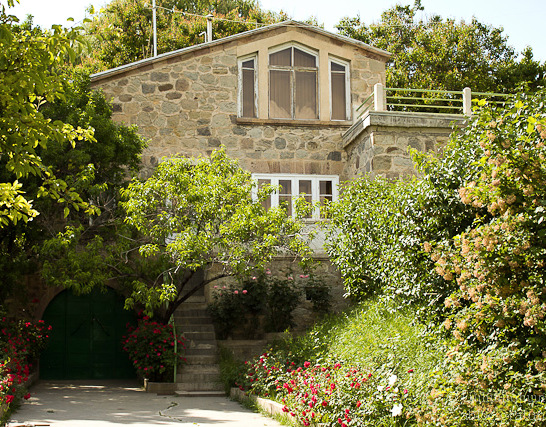
- Paruyr Sevak House-Museum in Zangakatun

- Location within Armenia Location within Ararat
- Coordinates: 39°48′34″N 45°03′04″E
- Country: Armenia
- Province: Ararat
- Municipality: Ararat

Population (2011)
  - Total: 1,042
- Time zone: UTC+4
  - Summer (DST): UTC+5

Zangakatun (Armenian: Զանգակատուն) is a village in the Ararat Municipality of the Ararat Province of Armenia. Zangakatun is the birthplace and burial site of Paruyr Sevak; his house is a museum. The village is also home to a 10th-century chapel.
