= Binary distribution (disambiguation) =

Binary distribution may refer to:

- Binary distribution, geographical term
- Software distribution, a method of software distribution, where the software is given out in a compiled form
- Bernoulli distribution, a discrete probability distribution which compels the random variable to take one of two values.
