= Romanization of Armenian =

There are various systems of romanization of the Armenian alphabet.

== Transliteration systems ==
=== Hübschmann-Meillet (1913) ===
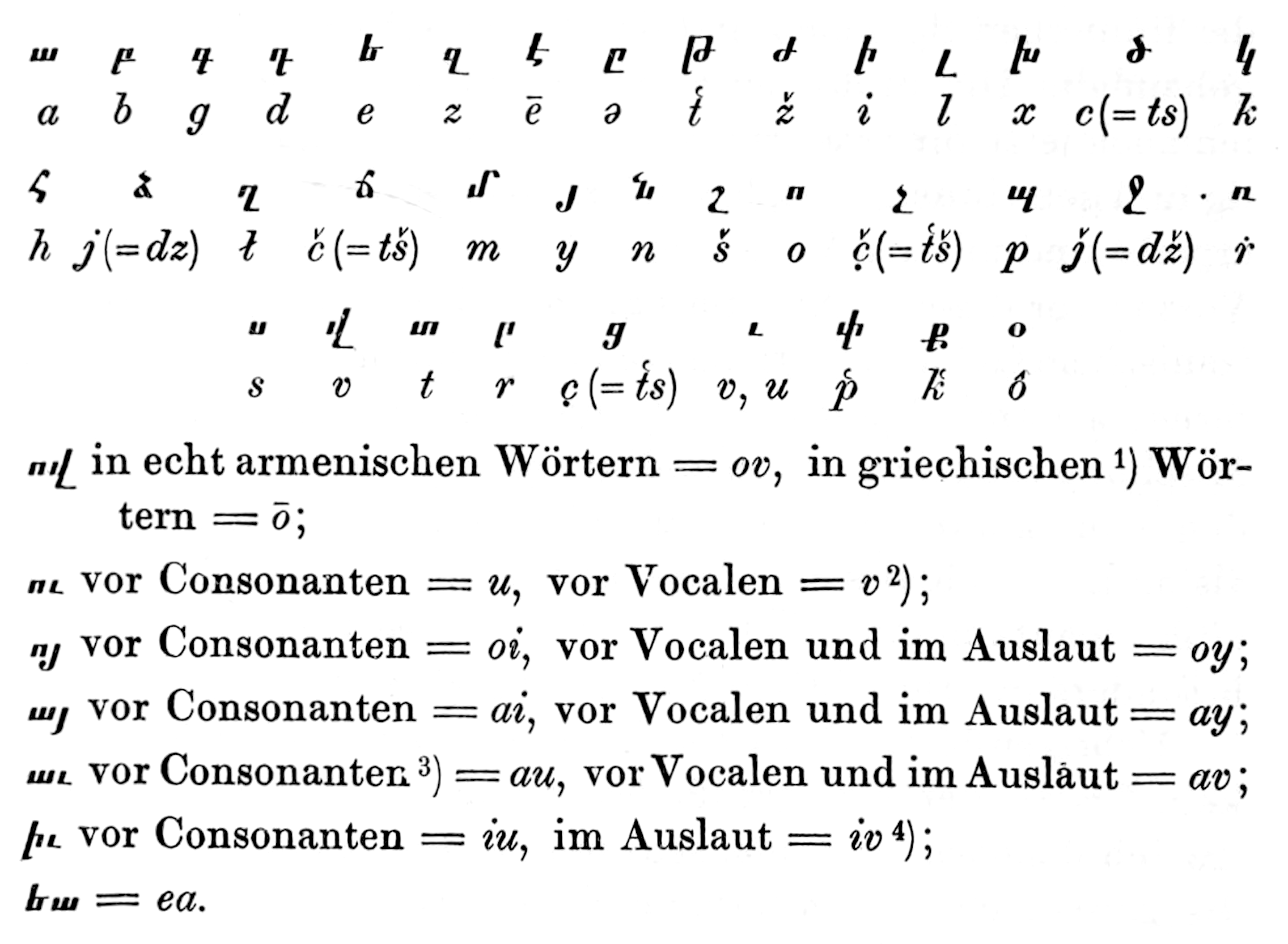
Hübschmann's Armenian alphabet romanization in Armenische Grammatik (1897).

In linguistic literature on Classical Armenian, the commonly used transliteration is that of Hübschmann-Meillet (1913). For aspirated consonants, Heinrich Hübschmann used the Greek rough breathing diacritic (U+0314) above the letter, a reversed comma combining above the letter and serves a similar purpose in Greek: t̔, ch̔, č̔, p̔, k̔. Antoine Meillet, after using the letter h in digraphs, used the same diacritic as Hübschmann but on the right of the letter, with fonts displaying either a half ring or a reversed comma. Émile Benveniste and the Revue des Études Arméniennes continued this use of the breathing mark on the side of the letter. Some authors use a combining dot above diacritic (U+0307) to express the aspirates: ṫ, cḣ, č̇, ṗ, k̇.

However, the computer support (fonts, rendering systems, availability on usual applications) of these combining diacritics has been poor for long, so some documents resorted to use, as possible fallbacks, their spacing variants (so-called “modifier letters”) written after the letter instead of above it, such as the spacing dot above ⟨˙⟩ (U+02D9), or the spacing turned comma ⟨‘⟩ (U+02BB) — or sometimes the spacing Greek-script rough breaking ⟨῾⟩ (U+1FFE), or the spacing grave accent ⟨ˋ⟩ or ASCII backquote or ⟨`⟩ (U+02CB or U+0060) even if they are too flat, or even the ASCII apostrophe-quote ⟨'⟩ (U+0027) when there was no confusion possible.

The preferred character today is the spacing left half-ring ⟨ʿ⟩ (U+02BF), or the spacing turned comma ⟨‘⟩ (U+02BB, which has the shape of a single left quotation mark), or the spacing reversed comma ⟨ʽ⟩ (U+02BD, which is the Latin-script equivalent of the Greek-script rough breathing), with the spacing turned comma having the advantage of excellent support in many Latin fonts because it is visually identical to the left single quote ⟨‘⟩.

Also, some ambiguities were not solved to work with modern vernacular Armenian, which has two dialects, both using two possible orthographies (besides, the modern orthography is used for Classical Armenian in modern publications).

=== BGN/PCGN (1981) ===
BGN/PCGN romanization (1981) uses a right single quotation mark (more accurately, a modifier letter apostrophe) to express aspirates, tʼ, chʼ, tsʼ, pʼ, kʼ, the opposite of the original rough breathing diacritic.

This romanization was taken up by ISO (1996) and is considered obsolete. This system is a loose transcription and is not reversible (without using dictionary lookup), notably for single Armenian letters romanized into digraphs (these non-reversible, or ambiguous romanizations are shown in a red cell in the table below).

Some Armenian letters have several romanizations, depending on their context:

- the Armenian vowel letter Ե/ե should be romanized as ye initially or after the vowel characters Ե/ե, Է/է, Ը/ը, Ի/ի, Ո/ո, ՈՒ/ու and Օ/օ; in all other cases it should be romanized as e;
- the Armenian vowel letter Ո/ո should be romanized as vo initially, except in the word ով where it should be romanized as ov; in all other cases it should be romanized as o;
- the Armenian consonant letter և should be romanized yev initially, in isolation or after the vowel characters Ե/ե, Է/է, Ը/ը, Ի/ի, Ո/ո, ՈՒ/ու and Օ/օ; in all other cases it should be romanized as ev.

=== ISO 9985 (1996) ===
ISO 9985 (1996) is the international standard for transliteration of the modern Armenian alphabet. Like with the BGN/PCGN romanization, the apostrophe is used to denote most of the aspirates.

This system is reversible because it avoids the use of digraphs and returns to the Hübschmann-Meillet (however some diacritics for vowels are also modified).

The aspirate series is not treated consistently in ISO 9985: while pʼ, tʼ, cʼ, kʼ are romanized with an apostrophe-like mark, aspirated չ č is not, and instead its unaspirated counterpart ճ is transcribed č̣ with an underdot appearing nowhere else in the system. Note that in this scheme, č (signifying չ) collides with the Hübschmann-Meillet transliteration (where it signifies ճ).

This system is recommended for international bibliographic text interchange (it is also the base of simplified romanizations found to localize the Armenian toponomy of for transliterating human names), where it works very well with the common ISO/IEC 8859-2 Latin encoding used in Central Europe.

=== ALA-LC (1997) ===
ALA-LC romanization (1997) is largely compatible with BGN/PCGN, but returns to expressing aspirates with a left single quotation mark (in fact the modifier letter left half-ring ʿ U+02BF, US-MARC hexadecimal code B0, that is also used to denote ayin in Arabic, so some documents may contain either the preferred left half-ring, or sometimes the ASCII backquote ` U+0060).

This standard changes the transliteration scheme used between Classical/Eastern Armenian and Western Armenian for the Armenian consonants represented by swapping the pairs b vs. p, g vs. k, d vs. t, dz vs. ts and ch vs. j.

In all cases, and to make this romanization less ambiguous and reversible,

- a soft sign (a prime, US-MARC hexadecimal code A7) is inserted between two separate letters that would otherwise be interpreted as a digraph (in red in the table below); no prime is present in the middle of romanized digraphs zh, kh, ts, dz, gh and ch representing a single Armenian letter;
- with the Classical Armenian orthography only, the vowel represented by e will be represented by y instead, when it is at the initial position in a name and followed by another vowel; this difficulty has disappeared in modern Armenian with the reformed orthography that changed the original Armenian letter in such case;
- with the Classical Armenian orthography only, the vowel represented by y will be represented by h instead, when it is at the initial position of a word or of a radical in a compound word; this difficulty has disappeared in modern Armenian with the reformed orthography that changed the original Armenian letter in such case.

=== ASCII-only input methods ===
On various Armenian websites, non-standard transliterators have appeared, which allows inputting modern Western or Eastern Armenian text using ASCII-only characters. It is not a proper transliterator but can be convenient for users that don't have Armenian keyboards.

Despite these input methods being commonly used, they do not adhere to any approved international or Armenian standard, so they are not recommended for the romanization of Armenian. Note that the input methods recognize the Latin digraphs zh, dz, gh, tw, sh, vo, ch, rr for Classic or Eastern Armenian, and zh, dz, tz, gh, vo, ch, rr for Western Armenian, but offer no way to disambiguate words where the digraphs should not be recognized.

Some Armenian letters are entered as Latin digraphs, and may also be followed by the input of an ASCII single quote (which acts as the only letter modifier recognized) but this quote does not always mean that the intended Armenian letter should be aspirated (this may be the reverse for the input ch'), it is also used as a vowel modifier. Due to ambiguities, texts must be corrected by entering an intermediate dummy character before entering the second Latin letter or quote, then removing the dummy character, so that the automatic input converter keeps the Armenian letters distinct.

== Transliteration tables ==
Some Armenian letters have very different phonetic sounds between Classical or Eastern Armenian and Western Armenian, so that the usage of Armenian letters is different between the two sub-branches of the language.

This is made visible in the table below by coloring transliterations specific to Classical or Eastern Armenian on green background, and those for Western Armenian on blue background. Other letters are transliterated independently of the language branch. However, cells with red background contain transliterations that are context dependent (and may in some cases create ambiguities, only the ISO 9985 and Hübschmann-Meillet romanizations do not use any context-dependent ambiguous digraphs for transcribing simple Armenian letters that are not ligatures, but the former is inconsistent with its representation of aspirated consonants and incompatible with all other systems for a pair of letters).

Armenian script	capital	Ա	Բ	Գ	Դ	Ե	Զ	Է	Ը	Թ	Ժ	Ի	Լ	Խ	Ծ	Կ	Հ	Ձ	Ղ	Ճ	Մ
Armenian script	capital	0531	0532	0533	0534	0535	0536	0537	0538	0539	053A	053B	053C	053D	053E	053F	0540	0541	0542	0543	0544
Armenian script	minuscule	ա	բ	գ	դ	ե	զ	է	ը	թ	ժ	ի	լ	խ	ծ	կ	հ	ձ	ղ	ճ	մ
Armenian script	minuscule	0561	0562	0563	0564	0565	0566	0567	0568	0569	056A	057B	056C	056D	056E	057F	0570	0571	0572	0573	0574
Romanization of Classical or Eastern Armenian	ASCII input	a	b	g	d	e	z	e'	y'	t'	zh	i	l	x	c'	k	h	dz	gh	tw	m
Romanization of Classical or Eastern Armenian	Hübschmann-Meillet	a	b	g	d	e	z	ê	ə	t̔, ṫ	ž	i	l	x	c	k	h	j	ł	č	m
Romanization of Classical or Eastern Armenian	ISO 9985	a	b	g	d	e	z	ē	ë	tʼ	ž	i	l	x	ç	k	h	j	ġ	č̣	m
Romanization of Classical or Eastern Armenian	BGN/PCGN	a	b	g	d	e, ye	z	e	y	tʼ	zh	i	l	kh	ts	k	h	dz	gh	ch	m
Romanization of Classical or Eastern Armenian	ALA-LC	a	b	g	d	e, y	z	ē	ě	tʿ	zh	i	l	kh	ts	k	h	dz	gh	ch	m
Romanization of Western Armenian	ALA-LC	a	p	k	t	e, y	z	ē	ě	tʿ	zh	i	l	kh	dz	g	h	ts	gh	j	m
Romanization of Western Armenian	ASCII input	a	p	k	t	e	z	e'	y	t'	zh	i	l	x	dz	g	h	tz	gh	j	m
Armenian script	capital	Յ	Ն	Շ	Ո	Չ	Պ	Ջ	Ռ	Ս	Վ	Տ	Ր	Ց	Ւ	Փ	Ք	Օ	Ֆ	ՈՒ	
Armenian script	capital	0545	0546	0547	0548	0549	054A	054B	054C	054D	054E	054F	0550	0551	0552	0553	0554	0555	0556	0548; 0552	
Armenian script	minuscule	յ	ն	շ	ո	չ	պ	ջ	ռ	ս	վ	տ	ր	ց	ւ	փ	ք	օ	ֆ	ու	և (եւ)
Armenian script	minuscule	0575	0576	0577	0578	0579	057A	057B	057C	057D	057E	057F	0580	0581	0582	0583	0584	0585	0586	0578; 0582	0587
Romanization of Classical or Eastern Armenian	ASCII input	y	n	sh	vo	ch	p	j	rr	s	v	t	r	c	w	p'	k', q	o	f	u	ev
Romanization of Classical or Eastern Armenian	Hübschmann-Meillet	y	n	š	o	č̔, č̇	p	ǰ	r̄	s	v	t	r	c̔, ċ	w	p̔, ṗ	k̔, k̇	ô	f	u	ev
Romanization of Classical or Eastern Armenian	ISO 9985	y	n	š	o	č	p	ǰ	ṙ	s	v	t	r	cʼ	w	pʼ	kʼ	ò	f	ow	ew
Romanization of Classical or Eastern Armenian	BGN/PCGN	y	n	sh	o, vo	chʼ	p	j	rr	s	v	t	r	tsʼ	w	pʼ	kʼ	o	f	u	ev, yev
Romanization of Classical or Eastern Armenian	ALA-LC	y, h	n	sh	o	chʿ	p	j	ṛ	s	v	t	r	tsʿ	w	pʿ	kʿ	ō	f	u	ew, ev
Romanization of Western Armenian	ALA-LC	y, h	n	sh	o	chʿ	b	ch	ṛ	s	v	d	r	tsʿ	w	pʿ	kʿ	ō	f	u	ew, ev
Romanization of Western Armenian	ASCII input	h'	n	sh	vo	ch	b	ch'	rr	s	v	d	r	c	w	p'	k', q	o	f	u	ev

Note that in the table above, the last two columns refer to digraphs, not isolated letters (however, they are considered letters in the Reformed orthography). However the last column displays the ligature that is used in the Classical orthography only as an isolated symbol for the short Armenian word ew (meaning and) and its derivations in a way similar to the ampersand (&) in the Latin script (in the Reformed orthography, it is also used at the middle and the end of words instead of եվ); the same transliteration to ew (classical Armenian) or ev (reformed orthography) will be used for the letters this ligature represents, when they are used as digraphs: it used to refer to the w consonant, now it refers to the v consonant.

Armenian script also uses some other digraphs that are often written as optional ligatures, in lowercase only (five of them are encoded in Unicode only for full roundtrip compatibility with some legacy encodings); when present, these ligatures (which are purely typographic and carry no semantic distinction in normal Armenian texts) must be romanized by decomposing their component letters.

== See also ==
- Armenian language
  - Classical Armenian
  - Western Armenian
  - Eastern Armenian
- Armenian alphabet
  - Classical Armenian orthography
  - Armenian orthography reform
- List of ISO romanizations
