= Michael Clyne =

Australian linguist, academic and intellectual

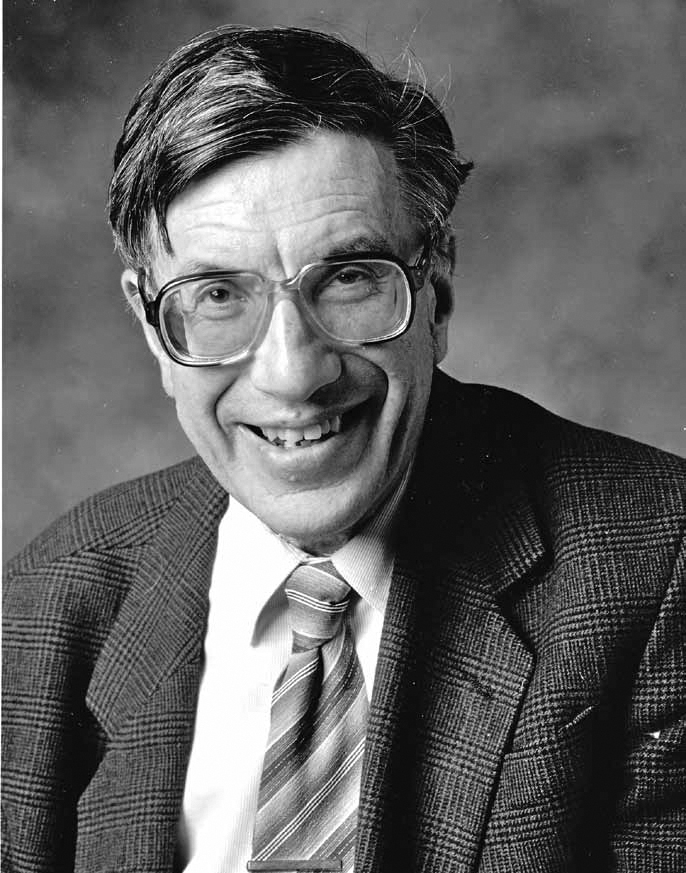
- Clyne
- Born: 12 October 1939; Prahran, Victoria, Melbourne, Australia
- Died: 29 October 2010 (aged 71)
- Education: University of Melbourne, Monash University
- Occupation: Linguist
- Known for: Contributions to multilingualism, sociolinguistics, contact linguistics

Michael George Clyne AM FAHA FASSA (12 October 1939 – 29 October 2010) was an Australian linguist, academic and intellectual. He was a scholar in various fields of linguistics, including sociolinguistics, pragmatics, bilingualism and multilingualism, second language learning, contact linguistics and intercultural communication.

== Biography ==
Clyne was born on 12 October 1939 in Prahran, Melbourne. He was the only child of the Jewish Austrian couple Johannes Jacob and Edith Cecily Clyne who had left their home country after the Anschluss. He was educated at Christ Church Grammar School, and at Caulfield Grammar School, where he was taught by Samuel Billigheimer. Clyne studied for his Bachelor and Master of Arts degrees at the University of Melbourne, focusing on Germanic and French languages. He undertook further graduate studies in German and general linguistics at Utrecht and Bonn Universities, before joining the German language faculty at Monash University in Melbourne in 1962. He earned a PhD from Monash in 1965, and was a Professor of Linguistics at the University from 1988 to 2001. In 2001, he became a professorial fellow of linguistics at Melbourne University and director of the university's Research Unit for Multilingualism and Cross-Cultural Communication. He retired in 2005.

Clyne was on the editorial board of at least 13 international journals. He was a Visiting Professor of Linguistics at the Ruprecht Karl University of Heidelberg and the University of Stuttgart. He spoke fluent English, German and Dutch, and had also studied French, Italian, Swedish and Norwegian.

He was made a Member of the Order of Australia (AM) on 13 June 1993 "in recognition of service to education, particularly in the field of linguistics". Clyne was a recipient of the Austrian Cross of Honour for Science and the Arts 1st cl and the German Cross of Merit 1st cl., He was awarded an honorary doctorate from LMU Munich, as well as the Centenary of Federation Medal, Inaugural Vice Chancellor's Award for Postgraduate Supervision (Monash University), 1999 Jacob und Wilhelm Grimm Prize (international German Studies prize), and Humboldt Research Prize.

He was elected a fellow of the Academy of the Social Sciences in Australia in 1982 and the Australian Academy of the Humanities in 1983. He was elected a foreign member of the Royal Netherlands Academy of Arts and Sciences in 2005.

Clye married Irene Donohoue in 1977, and they had a daughter Joanna. He died on 29 October 2010 in his home of heart failure, aged 71.

== Publications ==
Clyne published numerous books and articles (28 authored, co-authored and edited books and over 300 articles and book chapters) of research in areas of linguistics, particularly in the field of bilingualism. The books include Language and Society in the German-speaking Countries (Cambridge University Press (CUP), 1984), and its sequel The German Language in a Changing Europe (CUP, 1995), Community Languages The Australian experience (CUP 1991), Pluricentric Languages (ed, Mouton de Gruyter, 1992), Inter-Cultural Communication at Work (CUP, 1994), Undoing and Redoing Corpus Planning (ed, Mouton de Gruyter, 1997), Dynamics of Language Contact (CUP 2003), and Australia's Language Potential (University of New South Wales Press, 2005).

Lasting influence can be seen in Clyne's publications on linguistic pluricentricity, particularly in the German language, for which Clyne originally developed the notion in Language and Society in the German-speaking Countries in 1984 and which a number of scholars have developed further.

In the book, Developing Second Language From Primary School: Models and Outcomes (1995), the importance of a separate physical classroom is identified as an important factor which can contribute to the successful teaching of a language other than English in primary schools.

=== Books ===
- 1965 R. Taeni and M.G. Clyne, Efficient German. Macmillan, Melbourne and London. pp. xv + 260. (2nd edition, 1970. pp. xv + 271: 3rd edition, 1981. pp. v + 299.)
- 1967 Transference and Triggering. Nijhoff, The Hague. pp. xix + 148.
- 1972 Perspectives on Language Contact. Hawthorn Press, Melbourne. pp. 138.
- 1975 Forschungsbericht Sprachkontakt. Scriptor, Kronberg. pp. vi + 266.
- 1976 (ed.) Australia Talks: Essays on Australian Immigrant and Aboriginal Languages. Series D, No. 23. Pacific Linguistics, ANU, Canberra. pp. 244.
- 1981 Deutsch als Muttersprache in Australien. Franz Steiner Verlag, Wiesbaden. pp. 122.
- 1981 (ed.) Foreigner Talk. (= International Journal of the Sociology of Language 28) Mouton, The Hague. pp. 115.
- 1982 Multilingual Australia. River Seine, Melbourne. pp. x + 178. (2nd Edition, 1985. pp. x + 184.)
- 1983 S. Manton, J. McKay and M. Clyne, English Language Learning Needs of Adult Migrants in the Western Suburbs of Melbourne. (= Studies in Adult Migrant Education 1.) Australian Government Publishing Service, Canberra. pp. x + 144.
- 1984 Language and Society in the German-speaking Countries. Cambridge University Press, Cambridge and New York. pp. xiii + 205.
- 1985 (ed.) Australia, Meeting Place of Languages. (= Series C, No. 92). Pacific Linguistics, ANU Canberra. pp. v + 328.
- 1986a (ed.) An Early Start: Second Language at the Primary School. River Seine, Melbourne. pp. 160.
- 1986b (ed.) J.A. Fishman, A. Tabouret-Keller, M. Clyne, B. Krishnamurti and M. Abdulaziz, The Fergusonian Impact. Vol. I, From Phonology to Society. pp. xv + 545. Vol. II, Sociolinguistics and the Sociology of Language. Mouton de Gruyter, Berlin. pp. xv + 598.
- 1991a Community Languages: The Australian Experience. Cambridge University Press, Cambridge. pp. viii + 294.
- 1991b (ed.) Linguistics in Australia: Trends in Research. Academy of the Social Sciences in Australia, Canberra. pp. vi + 210.
- 1992 (ed.) Pluricentric Languages: Differing Norms in Different Nations. Mouton de Gruyter, Berlin. pp. vi + 481.
- 1993a H. Nicholas, H. Moore, M. Clyne, and A. Pauwels, Languages at the Crossroads. NLLIA, Melbourne. pp. xvi + 280.
- 1993b S. Fernandez, A. Pauwels, and M. Clyne, Unlocking Australia's Potential. Vol. 4: German. DEET/NLLIA, Canberra. pp. xi + 132.
- 1994 Inter-Cultural Communication at Work: Discourse Structures across Cultures. Cambridge University Press, Cambridge. pp. x + 250. Paperback 1996.
- 1995a M. Clyne, C. Jenkins, I. Chen, R. Tsokalidou and T. Wallner, Developing Second Language From Primary School: Models and Outcomes. NLLIA., Canberra. pp. 232.
- 1995b S. Kipp, M. Clyne and A. Pauwels, Immigration and Australia's Language Resources. AGPS, Canberra. pp. xvi + 168.
- 1995c The German Language in a Changing Europe. Cambridge University Press, Cambridge. pp. xv + 269.
- 1997a (ed.) Undoing and redoing corpus planning. Mouton de Gruyter, Berlin. pp. viii + 516.
- 1997b M. Clyne, S. Fernandez, I.Y. Chen and R. Summo-O'Connell, Background Speakers. Language Australia, Canberra. pp. iii + 177.
- 1999 M. Clyne and S. Kipp, Pluricentric Languages in an Immigrant Context: Spanish, Chinese, Arabic. Mouton de Gruyter, Berlin. pp. xxi + 360.
- 2003 Dynamics of Language Contact. Cambridge University Press, Cambridge. pp. xv +282.
- 2005 Australia's Language Potential. University of New South Wales Press, Sydney. pp. xii + 208.
- 2006 M. Clyne and S. Kipp, Tiles in a Multilingual Mosaic: Macedonian, Somali and Filipino in Melbourne. Pacific Linguistics, Canberra.

== See also ==
- List of Caulfield Grammar School people
