= Armenian orthography reform =

1922–24 Soviet reform of the Armenian orthography

The Armenian orthography reform occurred between 1922 and 1924 in Soviet Armenia and was partially revised in 1940. Its main features "were the neutralization of classical, etymological writing and the adjustment of phonetic realization and writing."

The original orthography is now known as the classical orthography (Armenian: դասական ուղղագրութիւն, romanized: dasakan uġġagrut'yun) and is sometimes referred to as Mashtotsian orthography (մաշտոցեան ուղղագրութիւն), after Mesrop Mashtots, who invented the Armenian alphabet in 405 AD.

This reform is not to be confused with the 13th-century alphabet extension introducing letters ⟨օ⟩ and ⟨ֆ⟩.

== Acceptance and evaluation ==
Today it is the officially used orthography for the Armenian language in Armenia, and widely used by Armenian communities in Georgia and Russia.

It was rejected by the Armenian diaspora, most of which speak Western Armenian, including the Armenian communities in Iran, which also speak Eastern Armenian and still use the classical orthography of the Armenian alphabet. While some authors hold that changes such as the regularization of the letters ‹o› and ‹ո› inside words resulted in orthographic simplification, others doubt if this was achieved.

== History ==
One of the most significant and successfully achieved policies of the former Soviet Union was the rise in the overall population's literacy, which began in the early 1920s. That was most probably the urgent need that was one of the reasons for reforming the orthography. With a variety of other educational reforms, the reformed orthography resulted in a literacy rate of 90% in the country by the early 1950s.

Pursuing faster progress, some other nations of the Soviet Union changed their scripts from Arabic (Central Asian nations) and Latin (Moldova) to Cyrillic in the same period.

Considering the vast panorama of the linguistic reforms carried out on the whole territory of the Soviet Union, the Armenian case is undoubtedly among the less radical ones.

This process was initiated in January 1921, when the historian Ashot Hovhannisyan, then Minister of Education of Armenian SSR, organized an advisory meeting to encourage education and fight illiteracy, as required by the Soviet likbez policy. During this consultation, the linguist and philologist Manuk Abeghyan proposed a number of orthographic changes that denoted a radical departure from the general norm in use since the Middle Ages. Abeghyan's position was not new: in fact, he had written extensively on the issue since the late 1890s. Indeed, this document, which was accepted by a special committee in 1921, presented the same theses of another paper Abeghyan read in 1913 in Echmiadzin. Hovhannisyan's successor, the translator and journalist Poghos Makintsyan, continued to work in this direction, forming a new committee in February 1922. Instead of transmitting the committee's conclusions, Makintsyan directly presented Abeghyan's proposal to the Soviet of Popular Commissars. On March 4, 1922, under the chairmanship of Aleksandr Myasnikyan, the reform was officially decreed.

== Rules ==
Since pronunciation had changed, spelling was modified to follow the modern pronunciation.

Changes can be summarized as follows: (Note: A list of changes from 1922 and the 1940 revision is provided at Dum-Tragut, Jasmine (2009). Armenian: Modern Eastern Armenian. John Benjamins Publishing. p. 12. ISBN 978-90-272-3814-6.)

- Letter of diphthong replacements (classical/reformed): ⟨յ/հ⟩, ⟨ու/վ⟩, ⟨ոյ/ույ⟩, ⟨եա/յա⟩, ⟨եօ/յո⟩, ⟨իւ/յու⟩.
- Elimination of the silent ⟨յ⟩ at the end of a word
- The digraph ⟨ու⟩ /u/ becomes the 34th independent letter of the alphabet.
- The letters ⟨է⟩ and ⟨օ⟩ were deleted from the alphabet but reinstated in 1940. Since then, they are written only at the beginning of a word and in compound words. ⟨ե⟩ or ⟨ո⟩ are used respectively in their places. The only exceptions are ով /ɔv/ "who" and ովքեր /ɔvkʰɛɾ/ "those (people)" and the present tense of "to be": եմ /ɛm/ "I am", ես /ɛs/ "you (sg.) are", ենք /ɛnkʰ/ "we are", եք /ɛkʰ/ "you (pl.) are", են /ɛn/ "they are".
- The letter ⟨ւ⟩ is no longer an independent letter and appears only as a component of ⟨ու⟩. In its place, ⟨վ⟩ is written.
- The ligature ⟨և⟩ was initially abolished, but in 1940, it became the 37th independent letter of the alphabet. Some words originally written with ⟨եվ⟩ are now written with it.
- In the conjugation of verbs, in both the indicative and the conditional modes, ⟨կ⟩ is added directly, without an apostrophe before vowels or ⟨ը⟩ before consonants.

== Reception and 1940 revision ==
Reform met immediate, unfavorable reactions. Notably, the poet Hovhannes Tumanyan, chairman of the Union of Armenian Writers, expressed his discontent in a letter to the Soviet of Popular Commissars, written in May 1922. Later on, many objected to the reform, asking the restoration of traditional Armenian spelling. Ch․ S. Sarkisyan's requested to correct the mistakes of the 1922 reform: “Armenian spelling now urgently needs the elimination of the mistakes made in 1922, that is, the abolition of those changes that were introduced into the alphabet”. As a consequence, on August 22, 1940, the linguist Gurgen Sevak (1904-1981) promoted a second reform of Armenian orthography, which marked a partial return to Mesropian spelling.

== After-effects ==
These reforms, which were part of the likbez policy carried out by the Soviets, have deeply affected not only the Eastern Armenian alphabet, but also the set of rules and conventions governing writing and word formation.

Since the establishment of the third Republic of Armenia in 1991, there has been a fringe movement in some Armenian academic circles to reinstate the classical orthography as official in Armenia. Some members of the Armenian Church in Armenia also support the use of the classical orthography. However, neither official circles nor the general population or pedagogical and scientific communities in Armenia supports reversing the reform.

Nevertheless, since 1991 the ligature ⟨և⟩ is oftentimes intentionally avoided in some print media, where ⟨եվ⟩ or ⟨եւ⟩ is used instead.

In modern Armenia, the 1922 orthography reform is still perceived as a heavy burden, insofar as it undermines the relationship between the two diasporas and the homeland.

== Examples ==
Examples
Classical spelling		Reformed spelling		IPA
script	translit.	script	translit.	IPA
հայերէն	hayerēn	հայերեն	hayeren	[hɑjɛˈɾɛn]
Յակոբ	Yakob	Հակոբ	Hakob	[hɑˈkɔb]
բացուել	bacʿuel	բացվել	bacʿvel	[bɑt͡sʰˈvɛl]
քոյր	kʿoyr	քույր	kʿuyr	[ˈkʰujɾ]
Սարգսեան	Sargsean	Սարգսյան	Sargsyan	[sɑɾɡəsˈjɑn]
եօթ	eōtʿ	յոթ	yotʿ	[ˈjɔtʰ]
ազատութիւն	azatutʿiwn	ազատություն	azatutʿyun	[ɑzɑtutʰˈjun]
տէր	tēr	տեր	ter	[ˈtɛɾ]
Արմէն	Armēn	Արմեն	Armen	[ɑɾˈmɛn]
Արմինէ	Arminē	Արմինե	Armine	[aɾmiˈnɛ]
խօսել	xōsel	խոսել	xosel	[xɔˈsɛl]
Սարօ	Sarō	Սարո	Saro	[sɑˈɾɔ]
թիւ	tʿiw	թիվ	tʿiv	[ˈtʰiv]
Եւրոպա	Ewropa	Եվրոպա	Evropa	[jɛvˈɾɔpɑ]

== See also ==
- Reforms of Russian orthography
- German orthography reform of 1996
- Belarusian orthography reform of 1933
- Reforms of French orthography
