= Narkamaŭka =

Term for a reformed version of Belarusian grammar

Narkamaŭka (Belarusian: наркамаўка, romanized: narkamaŭka, [nɐrˈkamɐukə] or Belarusian: наркомаўка, romanized: narkomaŭka, [nɐrˈkomɐukə]) is a colloquial name for the reformed Belarusian orthography. The name is derived from the Belarusian word narkam (наркам), which was a short form for the early Soviet name for a people's commissar, narodny kamisar (народны камісар) in Belarusian. Narkamaŭka is a simplified version of the Belarusian language's orthography, with some scholars claiming that it caused the language to become closer to Russian during Soviet era in Belarus.

The name was coined around the end of the 1980s, or the beginning of the 1990s, by the Belarusian linguist Vincuk Viačorka.

== See also ==
- Taraškievica
- Trasianka
- Russification of Belarus
