= Taraškievica =

Variant of Belarusian orthography

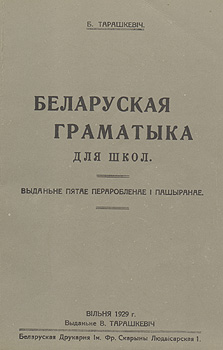
Cover of «Biełaruskaja hramatyka dla škoł» by Branislaŭ Taraškievič, where the codification of Taraškievica was made (5th edition, 1929)

Taraškievica (Belarusian: тарашкевіца, pronounced [taraʂˈkʲɛvʲit͡sa]) or Belarusian Classical Orthography (Belarusian: клясычны правапіс, romanized: klasyčny pravapis) is a variant of orthography of the Belarusian language, based on the literary norm of the modern Belarusian language, the first normalization of which was made by Branisłaŭ Taraškievič in 1918, and was in official use in Belarus until the Belarusian orthography reform of 1933. (Note: See:) Since 1933, Taraškievica has been used informally in Belarus and by the Belarusian diaspora abroad. In a more common sense Taraškievica is sometimes considered to be a linguistic norm.

The name Taraškievica (Tarashkyevitsa) is intended to emphasize the similarity of the orthography to the work of Branislaŭ Taraškievič and may have appeared before World War II.

Around 1994, an alias, Classical Orthography, was introduced by Vincuk Viačorka, the promoter and author of the modern codification of the Taraškievica.

In 2005, with the publishing of the Belarusian Classical Orthography, the modern normalization of Taraškievica was made. In 2007 the Internet Assigned Numbers Authority assigned Taraškievica its own variant subtag "tarask" (full language tag of Belarusian in the Classical orthography is "be-tarask").

== History ==
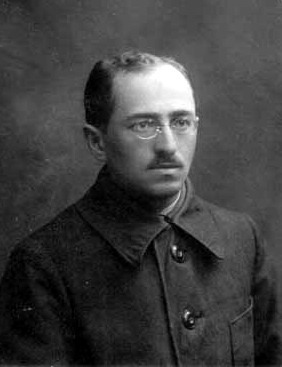
Branislaŭ Taraškievič

In 1918, prior to Belarus declaring independence, a desire for standardising the writing of Belarusian appeared. Several leading linguists made proposals:

- "Biełaruskaja hramatyka dla škoł" by Branislaŭ Taraškievič—the first edition used Łacinka (the Latin alphabet), and a Cyrillic variant soon followed
- "Hramatyka biełaruskaj mowy" by Balaslaŭ Pačopka
- "Biełaruski prawapis" by Anton Luckievič and Jan Stankievič
- "Prosty sposab stаcca u karotkim časie hrаmatnym" by Rudolf Abicht and Jan Stankievič

Eventually, Taraškievič's proposal was considered preferable. This was for a number of reasons: Taraškievič's orthography was the most well-grounded; it covered the majority of orthographic collisions; it built upon the previous Belarusian orthography; exercises for teaching purposes were included; and it was sponsored by Belarusian political leaders of the time.

The work of Taraškievič provided the definitive model for the main features of Belarusian. All later proposals and reforms of the Belarusian language have been based on his codification.

=== Reform proposals and Belarusian orthography reform of 1933 ===
In 1926 in Minsk an international conference on the reform of the Belarusian orthography was held, where some orthography issues were discussed. In 1927 a Linguistic Committee was formed which consisted of the Belarusian academicians and linguists, which worked on the problems of the Belarusian language and mainly developed the orthography norm by Taraškievič. In 1929 with the end of Belarusification the work of the committee was stopped. Despite this the results of its work was published in 1930.

In 1930 a group of scientists from the Belarusian Linguistic Institute started working on another proposal of Belarusian orthography reform. The authors of the proposal declared rejection of the ideas of "national democracy", which were, according to their beliefs, the base of the work by Linguistic Committee in 1927–1929. As a result, the group in 1933 proposed a deep revision of the Belarusian language, but kept the ideas of Taraškievič for loanwords in Belarusian and almost entirely reproduced the results of the 1930 proposal.

Despite this, the proposal was rejected by the USSR authorities because of too low loyalty of approaching of the Belarusian language to Russian. On 5 May 1933 Central Committee of the Communist Party of the BSSR formed a special Political Committee for revision of the Russian-Belarusian dictionary and new orthography rules of the Belarusian language. The Committee primarily consisted of politicians, and no linguist was included in it.

On 21 July 1933 a decree of the Bureau of the Central Committee of the Communist Party of the BSSR was published which stated the end of the work on the Belarusian language reform. On 27 August 1933 the proposal was approved by the decree of the Belarusian Central Committee of the Communist Party without any public discussion.

The Belarusian orthography reform of 1933 adopted all the changes of the Academical 1933 proposal which approached the Belarusian language to Russian. The reform introduced both phonetic and morphological changes, as well as vocabulary of Belarusian, where the words with no direct equivalents in the Russian language were excluded and some Russian words introduced. After the reform the manuscripts of the ready academic Belarusian dictionaries were destroyed.

As a result of Belarusian orthography reform of 1933 more than 30 phonetic and morphological features of the Russian language were introduced in Belarusian.

=== After 1933 ===
The legitimacy of the reform of grammar in 1933 was never adopted by certain political groups in West Belarus, unlike, e.g., the Communist Party of Western Belorussia (KPZB), neither by the emigrants, who left Belarus after 1944. This rejection was made an issue of ideology, and presented as anti-Russification. One of the most vocal critics was Jan Stankievič, beginning with his 1936 publication.

However, rejecting all post-1933 official developments, the community was left with all the problems of the pre-1933 grammar virtually unaddressed and effectively with no unified grammar to use.

After the 1930s Taraškievica was primarily used by the Belarusian diaspora abroad. The only wide-scale use of the pre-1933 grammar on the territory of Belarus after the 1930s took place during the German occupation of Belarus in 1941–1944.

== 1980s and later ==
During the perestroika period of the late 1980s, the movement for the return of Taraškievica in Belarus was initiated. At the beginning of the 1990s Taraškievica was used in Belarus along with the so-called “Narkamaŭka,” the official variant of Belarusian. On 14 June 1992 a conference of journalists and publishers who used the Classical orthography was held in Vilnius.

To solve the problem of standardization the Orthography Improvement Committee (Belarusian: Камісія па ўдасканаленьні правапісу, romanized: Kamisija pa wdaskanaleńni pravapisu) was created. The Committee worked in 1991–1992 and in 1993 published its proposals for orthographic changes.

In 2005 to standardize Taraškievica a working group of four people (consisting of Juraś Bušlakoŭ, Vincuk Viačorka, Źmicier Sańko and Zmicier Saŭka) work proposed codification of Taraškievica called Belarusian Classical Orthography as a result of intensive discussions and several years. This proposal was adopted by major Taraškievica-using media, including the newspaper Nasha Niva, Belarusian ARCHE magazine, the Belarusian editions of Radio Free Europe and Radio Polonia. As well, this variant of orthography became preferable for use in the Belarusian Wikipedia in Taraškievica orthography (be-tarask:)

On 27 April 2007 the Internet Assigned Numbers Authority assigned variant subtag "tarask" to Taraškievica. The full language tag of Belarusian in the Classical orthography is "be-tarask". As a language code of the Belarusian Wikipedia in Taraškievica orthography it was adopted, however, in September 2015, over 8 years after IANA decision. Previously (since March 2007 split-off of orthographical versions of Belarusian Wikipedia), "be-x-old" code was used.

== Differences between Taraškievica and the official orthography ==
=== Phonetics and spelling ===
Official orthography
Taraškievica
Alphabet
The variant from 1918.
In the variant of the 2005 normalization of Taraškievica, an optional letter is introduced: ґ, indicating a plosive /ɡ/.
The notation of assimilating 'softness' of consonants
The assimilating 'softness' of consonants is an orthoepical norm, not reflected in the spelling.
Examples: снег, з’ява, дзве.
Determined using the soft sign, ь.
Examples: сьнег, зьява, дзьве.
The phonetic principle in spelling
Generally limited to unstressed vowels.
Examples: стагоддзе, не толькі, тэатр.
Widespread, including consonants and at morpheme boundaries.
Examples: стагодзьдзе, ня толькі, тэатар.
Transliteration of foreign words
The syllables [la], [lo], [lu]
Transliterated mostly with a 'hard' [l].
Examples: план, логіка, Платон, клон.

In 1933 scholars of the Institute of Linguistics called the proposal for the introduction of these standards "Great Power tendencies", pointing out that it is a characteristically Russian pronunciation.

Transliterated with a 'soft' (palatalized) [lʲ] in words of Western European origin except for Anglicisms where the 'hard' (non-palatalized) [l] is used in most cases. In borrowing from other languages, words are transliterated according to the hardness or softness of the sound in the source language.
Examples: плян, лёгіка, Плятон, клон

The phonetic tradition developed with the newspaper Naša Niva.

The authors of the academic projects of 1930 and 1933 proposed to maintain this norm.

The transliteration of the Central European [l] with [lʲ] has been fixed in the forms of the Old Belarusian language (17th–18th centuries) (люнатык, лaбиринт, капалaнъ, каппеллѧ), as well as in the Belarusian forms of the 19th century (ляўр(ы), кляс(а)). The transliteration of the Arabic [l] with [lʲ] has been fixed in the Old Belarusian forms of the 17th century (корабеля < the city Karbala).

According to E. Potekhina, it is now difficult to say with certainty whether such pronunciation was widespread or if it was a characteristic of the intelligentsia's peculiar argot.

Dental consonants ⟨д⟩ /d/, ⟨т⟩ /t/, ⟨з⟩ /z/, ⟨с⟩ /s/ before front vowels ⟨е⟩ /je/, ⟨і⟩ /i/
Generally ⟨д⟩, ⟨т⟩ remain hard, and ⟨з⟩, ⟨с⟩ become soft.
Examples: дыван, тыгр, сігнал, фізіка, казіно, апельсін

in 1957, soft pronunciation of ⟨д⟩, ⟨т⟩ in front of endings -ін, -ір, -ёр, -еец, -ейскі was introduced in the official language norm: каранцін, камандзір, акцёр, гвардзеец, індзейскі, that are always pronounced hard.

Generally ⟨д⟩, ⟨т⟩ remain hard. ⟨з⟩, ⟨с⟩ remain hard in the beginning or middle of a word; in other cases [з], [с] become soft.
Examples: дыван, тыгр, сыгнал, фізыка, казіно, апэльсін

authors of academic projects of 1930 and 1933 suggested saving of this norm.

hard consonants before ⟨е⟩ were also used in the Old Belarusian language in 16th–17th centuries (сэнат, фэстъ; сындикъ, сындыкъ, сынодъ, визытовати, дыспозыцы(я)), as well as in Belarusian language in the 19th century (сэнат, маніфэст, пэнсія; сындыкат(ъ), сынод, дыспазыцы(я)).

in general, hard [д], ⟨т⟩ before front vowels and foreign words is considered to be the influence of Polish to the Belarusian spelling, sometimes quite old (14th century). Partially this phenomenon remains in the current Belarusian literary norm. This phenomenon is not usual for the national dialectal language.
Consonants ⟨п⟩ /p/, ⟨м⟩ /m/, ⟨б⟩ /b/, ⟨в⟩ /v/, ⟨н⟩ /n/ before front vowels ⟨е⟩ /e/
Generally the consonants are soft.
Examples: абанент, універсітэт, метрапалітэн, дэбет

In 1933 scholars of the Institute of Linguistics called the proposal for the introduction of these standards "Great Power tendencies", pointing out that it is a characteristically Russian pronunciation.

Generally hard consonants are used.
Examples: абанэнт, унівэрсытэт, мэтрапалітэн, дэбэт

authors of academic language projects of 1930 and 1933 proposed to keep this norm.

according to E. Potekhina, such a norm is not used in dialects of Belarusian.

although it is known that in general in dialects of Belarusian hard dental consonants become soft before soft front vowels in the foreign words, there is not much dialectical material available about the pronunciation of [с], [з], [н] in these positions; this complicates developing of rules of spelling which do not contradict with the language system.
Combinations of [j]/[й] ⟨j⟩ with vowels
Generally an added consonant [j] is used, and with it a number of limitations or exceptions exist.
Examples: маёр, Нью-Йорк, езуіт, маянэз, майя

Belarusian orthography rules of 2008 introduced consistent rules of how added consonant [j] is used.
Examples: маёр, Нью-Ёрк, езуіт, маянэз, мая

exceptions were tied to the spelling of respective words in the Russian language.

Added consonant [j] is consistently used.
Examples: маёр, Нью-Ёрк, езуіт, маянэз, мая
Transliteration of β and θ in the words of Greek origin
Partly after Byzantine Greek tradition, β is transliterated as ⟨в⟩ and θ as [ф] (so called Reuchlinian pronunciation); and after Latin system, β is transliterated as ⟨б⟩ and θ as ⟨т⟩ (so called Erasmian pronunciation).
Examples: абат, араб, сімвал, Візантыя; арфаграфія, міф, матэматыка, рытм
Transliterated consistently after the Latin system, β is transliterated as ⟨б⟩ and θ as ⟨т⟩ (so called Erasmian pronunciation).
Examples: абат, араб, сымбаль, Бізантыя; артаграфія, міт, матэматыка, рытм

authors of academic language projects of 1930 and 1933 proposed to keep this norm.

transliteration of β as ⟨б⟩ and θ as ⟨т⟩ was also in use in the Old Belarusian language in the 15th—17th centuries (дьѧбл-, дѧбл-, барбар(ъ); аритметыка, ѡртокграѳеѧ), as well as in the Belarusian language of the 19th century (дьябал(ъ), сымболь).

on the one hand [ф] was introduced into the Belarusian language along with foreign words quite long ago and now is used in Belarusian dialects; on the other hand it is difficult to say clearly about one or another pronunciation of sounds in ancient languages, and the current problem in the language is not to pronounce the particular words but to find a common writing tradition which in Belarus was influenced both by Byzantine Greek (popular among East Slavs) and Latin (with the influence of Polish) writing systems.

Francysk Skaryna, one of the first publishers in Eastern Europe, in his books used both Reuchlinian and Erasmian systems while Reuchlinian pronunciation was used by Skaryna widely.
Examples: Ѳедосий, Ѳемианъ, Матѳеи, Есѳеръ, Іюдиѳъ, Руѳь are to be read with [ф], but the words аритметика, темианъ, Їюдитъ appear in some places, which should be read with ⟨т⟩.

=== Morphology ===
Official orthography
Taraškievica
Usage of -ір-/-ыр- ⟨-ir-/-yr-⟩ formant in the verbs with adopted stems
Is kept in the adoptions through the Russian language.

Examples: фарміраваць, санкцыяніраваць, замаскіраваць

There is a public dispute about expediency of usage of -ір-/-ыр- formant. The absolute majority of adopted verbs are used without the -ір-/-ыр- formant which is not typical for Belarusian and is used primarily in the cases where it is required to avoid ambiguity.

Examples: фармаваць, санкцыянаваць, замаскаваць; буксаваць – буксіраваць, камандаваць – камандзіраваць, касаваць – касіраваць

Wider usage of nouns without affixes.

Examples: выступленне → выступ, наступленне → наступ, спадзяванне → спадзеў

Inflection system
For plural noun forms of masculine and neutral genders in prepositional case only -ах, -ях endings are allowed.
Examples: у лясах, у палях

According to linguist S. Stankievič, endings -ах, -ях are typical for the Russian language and were artificially introduced by the 1933 orthography reform instead of typical for the Belarusian language endings -ох, -ёх.

For plural noun forms of masculine and neutral genders in prepositional case endings -ах, -ях can be changed to -ох, -ёх but both variants are acceptable.

Examples: у лясах – у лясох, у палях – у палёх

In genitive case of plural noun forms of feminine gender -ей endings are typical.

Examples: магчымасцей, цяжкасцей, сувязей

According to linguist S. Stankievič, ending -ей is appropriate for the Russian language, whereas for the Belarusian language the typical ending is -яў.

In genitive case of plural noun forms of feminine gender -яў endings are typical.

Examples: магчымасьцяў, цяжкасьцяў, сувязяў

Widespread usage of ending -а for genitive case singular 1st declension nouns.

Examples: завода, інстытута, сацыялізма

Per linguist S. Stankievič, ending -а which is typical for the Russian language was introduced by the orthography reform of 1933 instead of typical for the Belarusian language ending -у.

Restriction of usage of ending -а for genitive case singular 1st declension nouns; ending -у is used instead.
Examples: заводу, інстытуту, сацыялізму

According to E. Potekhina, this change is directed toward larger similarity with the Polish language.

Usage of complex future forms only.
Examples: буду рабіць, будзем рабіць

Simple future forms were excluded from the Belarusian language by the orthographic reform of 1933.

Usage of the simple future form, that is typical for South-West dialects of Belarusian, is accepted alongside the widely used complex future form.
Examples: буду рабіць – рабіцьму, будзем рабіць – рабіцьмем

Widening of usage of ending -оў in genitive case of plural nouns.
Examples: словы – слоў → словаў, мовы – моў → моваў

Usage of endings of 2nd declension nouns in instrumental case for the 3rd declension nouns is allowed.

Examples: Беларусьсю – Беларусяй, з маці – з мацерай

Usage of ending -у for 1st declension single nouns in prepositional case is allowed.
Examples: у цені – у ценю, у Фаўстусе – у Фаўстусу

According to E. Potekhina, general changes in the declension system of nouns are possible to Taraškievica, i.e. active reducing of grammar interchanges and their accurate definition as continuation of the unification process of declension types by gender signs. Besides this, single cases of paradigm change for single lexemes occur. Potekhina notes, that the reason for this is the reorientation of literary language norms from the middle dialects of the Belarusian language to the West-Belarusian, that are less influenced by the Russian language, i.e. "to a greater extent Belarusian". Per Potekhina, the factor or language contacts in the borderlands is not taken into account for this process.

=== Syntax ===
The differences mainly affect government of prepositions.

Official orthography	Taraškievica
Change of the government of preposition па ⟨pa⟩
Variant (па + dative or prepositional case). Examples: па футболу – па футболе, па вызваленню – па вызваленні	Uniform (па + prepositional case). Examples: па футболе, па вызваленьні

=== Lexicology ===
The differences in lexicology are an evaluation of particular lexical items that are used in special cases; in general case these differences depend on the vocabulary chosen to be used by a speaker. Choice of the orthography does not play a considerable part for this, and the differences shown below might be used by the speakers in the wide sense independently of the chosen orthography.

Official orthography
Taraškievica
Borrowed lexical items
According to S. Stankievič, due to influence of the Russian language in BSSR, considerable amount of words, not typical for the language, were introduced into Belarusian, that nowadays are used in the official orthography.
Examples: асцерагацца → апасацца, гераізм → доблесць, угода → здзелка, цягнік → поезд
E. Potekhina notes that in an effort to exclude Russisms from the Belarusian language, borrowing from Polish becomes more intense, not necessarily of Polish lexical items.
Examples: пасол → амбасадар, фактар → чыньнік, карта → мапа, вадзіцель → кіроўца
Lexical items of historically Belarusian origin
Per S. Stankievič, an introduction in the Belarusian language of words with Belarusian roots but structured as in the Russian language is taking place; besides this, meanings of the Belarusian words are changed into meanings of respective Russian words having the same pronunciation but a different meaning.
Examples: скасаваць → адмяніць, скласці → саставіць, рабунак → грабеж, вайсковы → воінскі

A significant amount of Belarusian vocabulary was removed in the dictionaries published after the orthographic reform of 1933; in the variable cases, the words present in the Russian language were kept.

According to E. Potekhina, some items of Belarusian origin are being substituted.
Examples: адбывацца → тачыцца, умова → варунак, намаганьні → высілкі, іменна → менавіта

== See also ==
- Belarusian orthography reform of 1933
- Narkamaŭka
- Trasianka
- Ukrainian orthography of 1928 (Skrypnykivka) – contemporary pre-reform Ukrainian orthography
