= Belarusian orthography reform of 1933 =

The orthography of the Belarusian language was reformed in 1933 during the Soviet era. The resulting writing system has official status in Belarus today. It is also used by the Belarusian minority in Poland. The reform was detailed by Branislaw Tarashkyevich in the late 1920s. Starting on 16 September 1933, schools and publishers had to abide by the new orthographic rules.

== Differences between the old and the new orthography ==
1. The soft sign ⟨ь⟩ /ʲ/ is no longer written when denoting assimilation of 'softness': ⟨песня⟩, ⟨свет⟩, instead of ⟨песьня⟩, ⟨сьвет⟩.
2. The soft sign is no longer written between double consonants: ⟨каханне⟩, instead of ⟨каханьне⟩.
3. The particle ⟨не⟩ and the preposition ⟨без⟩ are written unchanged, independently of pronunciation: ⟨не быў⟩, instead of ⟨ня быў⟩; and ⟨без мамы⟩, instead of ⟨бяз мамы⟩ (compare with English definite article "the").
4. Loanword orthography is regulated:
  - Akanye is preserved in all cases except ten words (such as ⟨рэволюцыя⟩, ⟨совет⟩ instead of ⟨рэвалюцыя⟩, ⟨савет⟩; these exceptions were abolished in 1959)
  - Central-European L is transmitted as hard /l/ and not soft /lʲ/, as in Russian
  - The variants of writing the sound of ⟨ф⟩ with letters ⟨п⟩, ⟨хв⟩, ⟨х⟩, ⟨т⟩ are removed
  - The endings ⟨-тар⟩, ⟨-дар⟩ are replaced with ⟨-тр⟩, ⟨-др⟩, for example: ⟨літр⟩, instead of ⟨літар⟩
  - The endings ⟨-ый⟩, ⟨-iй⟩ are used where appropriate, for example: ⟨алюміній⟩ instead of ⟨алюміні⟩.
5. The orthography of personal names is regulated so that vernacular forms are replaced with canonical Orthodox forms, for example: ⟨Юрый⟩ instead of ⟨Юрка⟩, ⟨Юры⟩, ⟨Юра⟩ or ⟨Юрась⟩.
6. In morphology, the ending ⟨-а⟩/⟨-у⟩ denoting genitive case is regulated as ⟨-а⟩, as in Russian, and not as ⟨-у⟩, as in certain modern dialects. Also unified is the spelling of names in dative and prepositional case.

== See also ==
- Narkamaŭka
- Differences between Taraškievica and the official orthography

== Works cited ==
- Two Standard Languages within Belarusian: a Case of Bi-cultural Conflict by Ihar Klimaŭ (Belarusian State University of Culture and Arts) - École normale supérieure, 25 March 2006
