= Classical Armenian orthography =

Pre-1920s orthography still used by Armenian diaspora

Classical Armenian orthography, traditional orthography or Mashtotsian orthography (Հայերէնի դասական ուղղագրութիւն in classical orthography and Հայերենի դասական ուղղագրություն in reformed orthography, Hayereni tasagan ughakrutyun), is the orthography that was developed by Mesrop Mashtots in the 5th century for writing Armenian and reformed during the early 20th century. Today, it is used primarily by the Armenian diaspora, including all Western Armenian speakers and Eastern Armenian speakers in Iran, which has rejected the Armenian orthography reform of Soviet Armenia during the 1920s. In the Armenian diaspora, some linguists and politicians allege political motives behind the reform of the Armenian alphabet.

Classical Armenian orthography uses 38 letters: the original 36 letters of the Armenian alphabet invented by Mesrop Mashtots during the 5th century, and the 2 additional letters included later in the Armenian alphabet during the Middle Ages.

Majuscule	Ա	Բ	Գ	Դ	Ե	Զ	Է	Ը	Թ	Ժ	Ի	Լ	Խ	Ծ	Կ	Հ	Ձ	Ղ	Ճ	Մ	Յ	Ն	Շ	Ո	Չ	Պ	Ջ	Ռ	Ս	Վ	Տ	Ր	Ց	Ւ	Փ	Ք
Minuscule	ա	բ	գ	դ	ե	զ	է	ը	թ	ժ	ի	լ	խ	ծ	կ	հ	ձ	ղ	ճ	մ	յ	ն	շ	ո	չ	պ	ջ	ռ	ս	վ	տ	ր	ց	ւ	փ	ք

Majuscule	Օ	Ֆ
Minuscule	օ	ֆ

== Vowels ==
=== Monophthongs ===
Armenian has eight monophthongs (ɑ, ɛ, i, o, u, ə, ʏ, œ) and ten symbols to represent them (⟨ա, ե, է, ը, ի, ո, օ, ու, իւ, էօ⟩). The pronunciation in the examples is Western Armenian. They will be shown here with International Phonetic Alphabet:

	Front		Central	Back
	Unrounded	Rounded	Central	Back
Close	i ⟨ի⟩	ʏ ⟨իւ⟩		u ⟨ու⟩
Mid	ɛ ⟨է, ե⟩	œ ⟨էօ⟩	ə ⟨ը⟩	ɔ ⟨ո, օ⟩
Open				ɑ ⟨ա⟩

==== /ɑ/ — ⟨ա⟩, ⟨այ⟩ ====
1. The vowel ɑ is written ⟨ա⟩. For example: [ɑˈɹɛv] ("sun") is written արեւ.
2. Polysyllabic words ending in /ɑ/ are written with ⟨այ⟩. For example: [d͡zɑˈrɑ] ("slave") is written ծառայ; [ɡə tʰoˈʁɑ] ("s/he shivers") is written կը դողայ. There are exceptions:
  1. Certain words like հիմա, ահա, հապա, ապա, ասիկա, սա, ատիկա, անիկա, մամա, պապա.
  2. Proper nouns like Արա, Էլենա, Ասիա.
  3. The singular imperative form of type III verbs. For example: կարդալ → կարդա՛; լուալ — լուա՛.
  4. Foreign words ending in /ɑ/. For example: սոտա (soda), աղա (agha /ɑʁɑ/), etc.

==== /ɛ/ — ⟨է⟩, ⟨ե⟩ ====
1. At the end of a word, /ɛ/ is always written ⟨է⟩ (never ⟨ե⟩). For example: Մարգարէ, Վահէ, կը վազէ.
2. At the beginning of a word, /ɛ/ is written ⟨է⟩. For example: էջ, էակ.
3. In the middle of a word before a vowel, /ɛ/ is written ⟨է⟩. For example: գիտէիր, գործունէութիւն.
4. When followed by two consonants within a root word, /ɛ/ is written ⟨ե⟩. For example: ներկ, ուղերձ, խենդ, փեղկ.
5. When making a noun plural, ⟨եր⟩ or ⟨ներ⟩ is added to the end of the noun. For example: տուփ → տուփեր, դրամ → դրամներ.
6. When followed by ⟨լ⟩, ⟨հ⟩, ⟨ղ⟩, ⟨մ⟩, or ⟨ռ⟩, /ɛ/ is written ⟨ե⟩ (and not ⟨է⟩). The following are exceptions: դէմ, վէմ and foreign proper nouns: Երուսաղէմ, Դանիէլ.

==== /i/ — ⟨ի⟩ ====
/i/ is always written ⟨ի⟩. For example: [iɹ] ("his"/"her") is written իր.

==== /ɔ/ — ⟨օ⟩, ⟨ո⟩, ⟨ոյ⟩ ====
1. At the start of a word, /ɔ/ is written ⟨օ⟩ unless the following sound is [v], when ⟨ո⟩ is written. For example: [ɔɹˈɛŋkʰ] ("rule") is written օրէնք, and [ɔvɑˈsis] ("oasis") is written ովասիս.
2. In the middle of a root word followed by two consonants, /ɔ/ is written ⟨ո⟩ (not ⟨օ⟩). For example: [kʰɔɹkʰ] ("rug") is written գորգ, [hɔɹtʰ] ("calf") is written հորթ and [pʰɔʁɡ] ("radish") is written բողկ.
3. /ɔ/ at the end of a word is written ⟨ոյ⟩. For example: [jɛɹɛˈɡɔ] ("evening") is written երեկոյ, and [hɛˈdɔ] ("later") is written յետոյ. There are exceptions:
  1. The words այո՛ ("yes"), pronounced [ɑˈjɔ], and ծօ՛ ("you" in slang), pronounced [d͡zɔ].
  2. Proper nouns. For example: Պետօ ("Bedo"), Քոնկօ ("Congo").
  3. Foreign words. For example: օթօ ("auto"), սոլօ ("solo"), զերօ ("zero"), մեթրօ ("metro").
4. When a vowel is added to a word ending in ⟨օ⟩, the latter is changed to ⟨ոյ⟩. For example: Պետօ ([bɛˈdɔ]) → Պետոյին ([bɛdɔˈjin], "of/to Bedo"), Քոնկօ ([kʰɔŋˈɡɔ]) → Քոնկոյէն ([kʰɔŋɡɔˈjɛn], "from Congo").

==== /u/ — ⟨ու⟩ ====
/u/ is always written ⟨ու⟩. For example: [dun] ("house") is written տուն.

==== /ə/ — ⟨ը⟩, epenthetical ====
The [ə] vowel is usually not written. For example: [mədɑˈd͡zum] ("thought") is written մտածում (not մըտածում), and [əskʰɑnt͡ʃʰɛˈli] ("marvelous") is written սքանչելի (not ըսքանչելի).

⟨ը⟩ is written in the following cases:

1. At the start of a word if the following sound is a [n] (⟨ն⟩) or [m] (⟨մ⟩). For example: [əndˈɹɛl] ("to choose") is written ընտրել, [əŋˈɡɛɹ] ("friend") is written ընկեր, [əmˈpʰɔsd] ("defiant") is written ըմբոստ and [əmpʰərˈnɛl] ("to comprehend") is written ըմբռնել.
2. At the start of a word if the [ə] vowel stems from the [i] or [u] sound. For example: [əʁˈt͡sʰɑl] ("to desire") is written ըղձալ because it stems from the noun [iʁt͡sʰ] ("desire", իղձ). Also, [əmˈbɛl] ("to drink") is written ըմպել because it stems from the noun [umb] ("mouthful", ումպ). It is also written in the case of the Western Armenian verbs [əˈnɛl] ("to do", ընել), [əˈsɛl] ("to say", ըսել), and [əˈlːɑl] ("to be", ըլլալ).
3. At the start or the middle of a monosyllabic word whose only vowel is [ə]. For example: [əsd] ("according to") is written ըստ, and [mən] ("a" or "an", indefinite article) is written մըն.
4. In derivative and compound words if their second part starts with [ə]. For example: [ɑnəntʰunɛˈli] ("inadmissible") is written անընդունելի because it is a derivative word that is formed from the prefix [ɑn] ("un-", ան-) and the root [əntʰunɛˈli] ("admissible", ընդունելի). Also, [ɑɹɑkʰəntʰɑt͡sʰ] ("swift") is written արագընթաց because it is a compound word that is formed from the root words արագ ("quick") and ընթացք ("gait").
5. Within a word after the letters ⟨ու⟩, if they are not followed by a vowel they represent [v]. For example: պահուըտիլ ([bɑhvəˈdil] "to hide") and վաղուընէ ([vɑʁvəˈnɛ] "from tomorrow").
6. In line-breaking. For example: վնաս ([vəˈnɑs], "harm") becomes վը–նաս, and զգալ (əzˈkʰɑl, "to feel") becomes ըզ–գալ.
7. At the end of words, to specify the article "the". For example: լոյսը ([ˈlujsə], "the light") is formed by adding ⟨ը⟩ to the end of լոյս. Also, արձանները ([ɑɹt͡sʰɑnˈnɛɹə], "the statues") does the same.

==== /ʏ/ — ⟨իւ⟩ ====
/ʏ/ is always written ⟨իւ⟩. For example: [kʰʏʁ] ("village") is written գիւղ.

==== /œ/ — ⟨էօ⟩ ====
/œ/ is a rare sound to write foreign words and is always written ⟨էօ⟩. For example: the female name [œʒɛˈni] ("Eugenie") is written Էօժենի, a transcription of letters.

=== Diphthongs ===
Armenian has nine diphthongs: /jɑ/, /jɛ/, /ji/, /jɔ/, /ju/, /ɑj/, /ej/, /ij/, /uj/.

==== /jɑ/ — ⟨եա⟩, ⟨եայ⟩, ⟨յա⟩; occurs in ⟨էա⟩, ⟨իա⟩ ====
/jɑ/ is written differently depending on its context.

1. [jɑ] at the start of a word is written ⟨եա⟩. For example: [jɑniˈkʰjɑn] ("Yanikian", a family name) is written Եանիքեան.
2. Preceded by a consonant, it is written ⟨եա⟩. For example: [sɛˈnjɑɡ] ("room") is written սենեակ. However, at the end of a word, ⟨եա⟩ is written ⟨եայ⟩. For example: [ɑrɔˈɾja] ("daily") is written առօրեայ. (This rule does not apply to the Classical Armenian imperatives փրկեա՛, ողորմեա՛, etc.)
3. When [jɑ] is preceded by a vowel other than [i] or [ɛ], it is written ⟨յա⟩. For example: [ɡɑˈjɑn] ("station") is written կայան.
4. A disyllabic sequence of a monophthong ([i]) and a diphthong ([jɑ]) is written ⟨իա⟩ (⟨իայ⟩ when at the end of a word). For example: [mijɑˈsin] ("together") is written միասին.
5. A disyllabic sequence of a monophthong ([ɛ]) and a diphthong ([jɑ]) is written ⟨էա⟩ (or ⟨էայ⟩ at the end of a word). For example: [ɛˈjɑɡ] ("being", the noun) is written էակ.

==== /jɛ/ — ⟨ե⟩, ⟨յե⟩, ⟨յէ⟩ ====
/jɛ/ is written differently depending on its context.

1. At the start of a word, it is written ⟨ե⟩. For example: [jɛˈɾɑz] ("dream") is written երազ. ⟨ե⟩ between two consonants represents /ɛ/ (see above for details).
2. In the middle of a word, /jɛ/ is written ⟨յե⟩. For example: [hɑjɛˈli] ("mirror") is written հայելի. ⟨յե⟩ at the start of a word represents [hɛ] (see below for details).
3. At the end of a word, /jɛ/ is written ⟨յէ⟩ (never ⟨յե⟩). For example: [nɑˈjɛ] ("look!") is written նայէ՛.

==== /ji/ — ⟨յի⟩; occurs in ⟨էի⟩ ====
/ji/ is never at the start of a word and is written differently depending on its context:

1. A disyllabic sequence of a monophthong ([ɛ]) and a diphthong ([ji]) is written ⟨էի⟩. For example: [ɛˈji] ("I was") is written էի, and [ɡ‿uzɛˈjin] ("they wanted") is written կ'ուզէին.
2. Otherwise, /ji/ is written ⟨յի⟩. For example: [mɑˈjis] ("May") is written Մայիս. ⟨յի⟩ at the start of a word represents [hi] (see below for details).

==== /jɔ/ — ⟨եօ⟩ ====
/jɔ/ is always written ⟨եօ⟩. For example: [ˈjɔtʰə] ("seven") is written եօթը.

==== /ju/ — ⟨յու⟩, ⟨իւ⟩; occurs in ⟨իու⟩, ⟨էու⟩ ====
/ju/ is written differently depending on its context:

1. At the start of a word, /ju/ is written ⟨իւ⟩. For example: [juʁ] ("oil") is written իւղ.
2. After a vowel other than [i] or [ɛ], it is written ⟨յու⟩. For example: [kɑˈjun] ("firm") is written կայուն. ⟨յու⟩ at the start of a word represents [hu] (see below for an example).
3. The disyllabic sequence of the monophthong [i] and the diphthong [ju] is written ⟨իու⟩. For example: [mijuˈtʰjun] ("union") is written միութիւն.
4. The disyllabic sequence of the monophthong [ɛ] and the diphthong [ju] is written ⟨էու⟩. For example: [ɛjuˈtʰjun] ("essence") is written էութիւն.
5. To write the suffix [ˈtʰjun], -թիւն is used. For example: [kʰiduˈtʰjun] ("knowledge") is written գիտութիւն.

==== /ɑj/ — ⟨այ⟩ ====
/ɑj/ can occur at the end of a word only for monosyllabic words. It is written ⟨այ⟩. For example: [ɑjˈkʰi] ("field") is written այգի, [mɑjɾ] ("mother") is written մայր and [pʰɑj] ("verb") is written բայ. A polysyllabic word ending in ⟨այ⟩ is pronounced /ɑ/, the ⟨յ⟩ becoming silent (see above for an example).

==== /ej/ — ⟨էյ⟩ ====
/ej/ is written ⟨էյ⟩. For example: [tʰej] ("tea") is written թէյ.

==== /ij/ — ⟨իյ⟩ ====
/ij/ is written ⟨իյ⟩. For example: [ijˈnɑl] ("to fall") is written իյնալ.

==== /uj/ — ⟨ոյ⟩ ====
/uj/ usually occurs in the middle of a word, and is written ⟨ոյ⟩. For example: [kʰujr] ("sister") is written քոյր.

== Consonants ==
The International Phonetic Alphabet shows the consonants, by the corresponding Armenian letter in parentheses. Both Classical And Eastern Armenian maintain a three-way distinction between voiced, voiceless, and aspirated stops and affricates. In Western Armenian, voiced and aspirated stops and affricates have undergone a merger, and voiceless stops and affricates have become voiced.

		Labial			Alveolar			Post- alveolar			Velar			Uvular	Glottal
		CA	EA	WA	CA	EA	WA	CA	EA	WA	CA	EA	WA	Uvular	Glottal
Nasal		m ⟨մ⟩			n ⟨ն⟩										
Plosive	Voiceless	p ⟨պ⟩			t ⟨տ⟩						k ⟨կ⟩				
Plosive	Aspirated	pʰ ⟨փ⟩		pʰ ⟨բ, փ⟩	tʰ ⟨թ⟩		tʰ ⟨դ, թ⟩				kʰ ⟨ք⟩		kʰ ⟨գ, ք⟩		
Plosive	Voiced	b ⟨բ⟩		b ⟨պ⟩	d ⟨դ⟩		d ⟨տ⟩				ɡ ⟨գ⟩		ɡ ⟨կ⟩		
Affricate	Voiceless				t͡s ⟨ծ⟩			t͡ʃ ⟨ճ⟩							
Affricate	Aspirated				t͡sʰ ⟨ց⟩		t͡sʰ ⟨ձ, ց⟩	t͡ʃʰ ⟨չ⟩		t͡ʃʰ ⟨չ, ջ⟩					
Affricate	Voiced				d͡z ⟨ձ⟩		d͡z ⟨ծ⟩	d͡ʒ ⟨ջ⟩		d͡ʒ ⟨ճ⟩					
Fricative	Voiceless	f ⟨ֆ⟩			s ⟨ս⟩			ʃ ⟨շ⟩			x ~ χ ⟨խ⟩				h ⟨հ, յ⟩
Fricative	Voiced	v ⟨վ, ւ, ու, ո⟩			z ⟨զ⟩			ʒ ⟨ժ⟩				ɣ ~ ʁ ⟨ղ⟩			
Approximant					ɹ ⟨ր⟩			j ⟨յ, ե, ի⟩							
Tap/Trill					r ⟨ռ⟩		ɾ ⟨ռ, ր⟩								
Lateral					l ⟨լ⟩						ɫ ⟨ղ⟩				
