= Binary distribution =

Presence of two or more very large and dominant cities in a country

Binary distribution is the presence of two or more very large and dominant cities in a country.

== Countries with binary distribution ==
- Australia (Melbourne, Sydney)
- Brazil (São Paulo, Rio de Janeiro)
- Canada (Toronto, Montréal)
- China (Shanghai, Beijing)
- India (Mumbai, Delhi)
- Italy (Rome, Milan)
- Japan (Tokyo, Osaka-Kobe-Kyoto)
- Netherlands (Amsterdam, Rotterdam)
- Russia (Moscow, Saint Petersburg)
- Spain (Madrid, Barcelona)
- Turkey (Ankara, Istanbul)
- USA (New York City, Los Angeles)
- Vietnam (Ho Chi Minh City, Hanoi)
