= List of Unicode characters =

Unicode logo

As of Unicode version 18.0, there are 310,341 assigned characters with code points, covering 175 modern and historical scripts, as well as multiple symbol sets. As it is not technically possible to list all of these characters in a single page, this list is limited to a subset of the most important characters for English-language readers, with links to other pages which list the supplementary characters. Accordingly, this article lists the 1,062 characters in the Multilingual European Character Set 2 (MES-2) subset, and some additional related characters. (The term Unicode character was coined to categorise characters that do not also have ASCII code points.)

== Character reference overview ==

HTML and XML provide ways to reference Unicode characters when the characters themselves either cannot or should not be used. A numeric character reference refers to a character by its Universal Character Set/Unicode code point, and a character entity reference refers to a character by a predefined name.

A numeric character reference uses the format

&#nnnn;

or

&#xhhhh;

where nnnn is the code point in decimal form, and hhhh is the code point in hexadecimal form. The x must be lowercase in XML documents. The nnnn or hhhh may be any number of digits and may include leading zeros. The hhhh may mix uppercase and lowercase, though uppercase is the usual style.

In contrast, a character entity reference refers to a character by the name of an entity which has the desired character as its replacement text. The entity must either be predefined (built into the markup language) or explicitly declared in a Document Type Definition (DTD). The format is the same as for any entity reference:

&name;

where name is the case-sensitive name of the entity. The semicolon is required.

Because numbers are harder for humans to remember than names, character entity references are most often written by humans, while numeric character references are most often produced by computer programs.

== Control codes ==
65 characters, including DEL. All belong to the common script.

| | Code | Decimal | Octal | Description | Abbreviation / Key |
|---|---|---|---|---|---|
| C0 | U+0000 | 0 | 000 | Null character | NUL |
| C0 | U+0001 | 1 | 001 | Start of Heading | SOH / Ctrl-A |
| C0 | U+0002 | 2 | 002 | Start of Text | STX / Ctrl-B |
| C0 | U+0003 | 3 | 003 | End-of-text character | ETX / Ctrl-C^{1} |
| C0 | U+0004 | 4 | 004 | End-of-transmission character | EOT / Ctrl-D^{2} |
| C0 | U+0005 | 5 | 005 | Enquiry character | ENQ / Ctrl-E |
| C0 | U+0006 | 6 | 006 | Acknowledge character | ACK / Ctrl-F |
| C0 | U+0007 | 7 | 007 | Bell character | BEL / Ctrl-G^{3} |
| C0 | U+0008 | 8 | 010 | Backspace | BS / Ctrl-H |
| C0 | U+0009 | 9 | 011 | Horizontal tab | HT / Ctrl-I |
| C0 | U+000A | 10 | 012 | Line feed | LF / Ctrl-J^{4} |
| C0 | U+000B | 11 | 013 | Vertical tab | VT / Ctrl-K |
| C0 | U+000C | 12 | 014 | Form feed | FF / Ctrl-L |
| C0 | U+000D | 13 | 015 | Carriage return | CR / Ctrl-M^{5} |
| C0 | U+000E | 14 | 016 | Shift Out | SO / Ctrl-N |
| C0 | U+000F | 15 | 017 | Shift In | SI / Ctrl-O^{6} |
| C0 | U+0010 | 16 | 020 | Data Link Escape | DLE / Ctrl-P |
| C0 | U+0011 | 17 | 021 | Device Control 1 | DC1 / Ctrl-Q^{7} |
| C0 | U+0012 | 18 | 022 | Device Control 2 | DC2 / Ctrl-R |
| C0 | U+0013 | 19 | 023 | Device Control 3 | DC3 / Ctrl-S^{8} |
| C0 | U+0014 | 20 | 024 | Device Control 4 | DC4 / Ctrl-T |
| C0 | U+0015 | 21 | 025 | Negative-acknowledge character | NAK / Ctrl-U^{9} |
| C0 | U+0016 | 22 | 026 | Synchronous Idle | SYN / Ctrl-V |
| C0 | U+0017 | 23 | 027 | End of Transmission Block | ETB / Ctrl-W |
| C0 | U+0018 | 24 | 030 | Cancel character | CAN / Ctrl-X^{10} |
| C0 | U+0019 | 25 | 031 | End of Medium | EM / Ctrl-Y |
| C0 | U+001A | 26 | 032 | Substitute character | SUB / Ctrl-Z^{11} |
| C0 | U+001B | 27 | 033 | Escape character | ESC |
| C0 | U+001C | 28 | 034 | File Separator | FS |
| C0 | U+001D | 29 | 035 | Group Separator | GS |
| C0 | U+001E | 30 | 036 | Record Separator | RS |
| C0 | U+001F | 31 | 037 | Unit Separator | US |
| | U+007F | 127 | 0177 | Delete | DEL |
| C1 | U+0080 | 128 | 0302 0200 | Padding Character | PAD |
| C1 | U+0081 | 129 | 0302 0201 | High Octet Preset | HOP |
| C1 | U+0082 | 130 | 0302 0202 | Break Permitted Here | BPH |
| C1 | U+0083 | 131 | 0302 0203 | No Break Here | NBH |
| C1 | U+0084 | 132 | 0302 0204 | Index | IND |
| C1 | U+0085 | 133 | 0302 0205 | Next Line | NEL |
| C1 | U+0086 | 134 | 0302 0206 | Start of Selected Area | SSA |
| C1 | U+0087 | 135 | 0302 0207 | End of Selected Area | ESA |
| C1 | U+0088 | 136 | 0302 0210 | Character Tabulation Set | HTS |
| C1 | U+0089 | 137 | 0302 0211 | Character Tabulation with Justification | HTJ |
| C1 | U+008A | 138 | 0302 0212 | Line Tabulation Set | VTS |
| C1 | U+008B | 139 | 0302 0213 | Partial Line Forward | PLD |
| C1 | U+008C | 140 | 0302 0214 | Partial Line Backward | PLU |
| C1 | U+008D | 141 | 0302 0215 | Reverse Line Feed | RI |
| C1 | U+008E | 142 | 0302 0216 | Single-Shift Two | SS2 |
| C1 | U+008F | 143 | 0302 0217 | Single-Shift Three | SS3 |
| C1 | U+0090 | 144 | 0302 0220 | Device Control String | DCS |
| C1 | U+0091 | 145 | 0302 0221 | Private Use 1 | PU1 |
| C1 | U+0092 | 146 | 0302 0222 | Private Use 2 | PU2 |
| C1 | U+0093 | 147 | 0302 0223 | Set Transmit State | STS |
| C1 | U+0094 | 148 | 0302 0224 | Cancel character | CCH |
| C1 | U+0095 | 149 | 0302 0225 | Message Waiting | MW |
| C1 | U+0096 | 150 | 0302 0226 | Start of Protected Area | SPA |
| C1 | U+0097 | 151 | 0302 0227 | End of Protected Area | EPA |
| C1 | U+0098 | 152 | 0302 0230 | Start of String | SOS |
| C1 | U+0099 | 153 | 0302 0231 | Single Graphic Character Introducer | SGCI |
| C1 | U+009A | 154 | 0302 0232 | Single Character Intro Introducer | SCI |
| C1 | U+009B | 155 | 0302 0233 | Control Sequence Introducer | CSI |
| C1 | U+009C | 156 | 0302 0234 | String Terminator | ST |
| C1 | U+009D | 157 | 0302 0235 | Operating System Command | OSC |
| C1 | U+009E | 158 | 0302 0236 | Private Message | PM |
| C1 | U+009F | 159 | 0302 0237 | Application Program Command | APC |
| | Code | Decimal | Octal | Description | Abbreviation |

Footnotes:

^{1} Control-C has typically been used as a "break" or "interrupt" key.
^{2} Control-D has been used to signal "end of file" for text typed in at the terminal on Unix / Linux systems. Windows, MS-DOS, and older minicomputers used Control-Z for this purpose.
^{3} Control-G is an artifact of the days when teletypes were in use. Important messages could be signaled by striking the bell on the teletype. This was carried over on PCs by generating a buzzing sound.
^{4} Line feed is used for "end of line" in text files on Unix / Linux systems.
^{5} Carriage Return (accompanied by line feed, and thus usually written as 'CRLF') is used as "end of line" character by Windows, MS-DOS, and most minicomputers other than Unix- / Linux-based systems. Classic Mac OS and other vintage OS used CR only.
^{6} Control-O has been the "discard output" key. Output is not sent to the terminal, but discarded, until another Control-o is typed.
^{7} Control-Q has been used to tell a host computer to resume sending output after it was stopped by Control-S.
^{8} Control-S has been used to tell a host computer to postpone sending output to the terminal. Output is suspended until restarted by the Control-Q key.
^{9} Control-U was originally used by Digital Equipment Corporation computers to cancel the current line of typed-in text. Other manufacturers used Control-X for this purpose.
^{10} Control-X was commonly used to cancel a line of input typed in at the terminal.
^{11} Control-Z has commonly been used on minicomputers, Windows and MS-DOS systems to indicate "end of file" either on a terminal or in a text file. Unix / Linux systems use Control-D to indicate end-of-file at a terminal.

== European scripts ==
=== Latin script ===
The Unicode Standard (version 18.0) classifies 1,653 characters as belonging to the Latin script.

==== Basic Latin ====
95 characters; the 52 alphabet characters belong to the Latin script. The remaining 43 belong to the common script.
The 33 characters classified as ASCII Punctuation & Symbols are also sometimes referred to as ASCII special characters. Often only these characters (and not other Unicode punctuation) are what is meant when an organization says a password "requires punctuation marks".

| | Code | Glyph | Decimal | Octal | Description | # |
|---|---|---|---|---|---|---|
| ASCII; Punctuation & Symbols | U+0020 | | 32 | 040 | Space | 0001 |
| ASCII; Punctuation & Symbols | U+0021 | ! | 33 | 041 | Exclamation mark | 0002 |
| ASCII; Punctuation & Symbols | U+0022 | " | 34 | 042 | Quotation mark | 0003 |
| ASCII; Punctuation & Symbols | U+0023 | # | 35 | 043 | Number sign, Hash, Octothorpe, Sharp | 0004 |
| ASCII; Punctuation & Symbols | U+0024 | $ | 36 | 044 | Dollar sign | 0005 |
| ASCII; Punctuation & Symbols | U+0025 | % | 37 | 045 | Percent sign | 0006 |
| ASCII; Punctuation & Symbols | U+0026 | & | 38 | 046 | Ampersand | 0007 |
| ASCII; Punctuation & Symbols | U+0027 | ' | 39 | 047 | Apostrophe | 0008 |
| ASCII; Punctuation & Symbols | U+0028 | ( | 40 | 050 | Left parenthesis | 0009 |
| ASCII; Punctuation & Symbols | U+0029 | ) | 41 | 051 | Right parenthesis | 0010 |
| ASCII; Punctuation & Symbols | U+002A | * | 42 | 052 | Asterisk | 0011 |
| ASCII; Punctuation & Symbols | U+002B | + | 43 | 053 | Plus sign | 0012 |
| ASCII; Punctuation & Symbols | U+002C | , | 44 | 054 | Comma | 0013 |
| ASCII; Punctuation & Symbols | U+002D | - | 45 | 055 | Hyphen-minus | 0014 |
| ASCII; Punctuation & Symbols | U+002E | . | 46 | 056 | Full stop | 0015 |
| ASCII; Punctuation & Symbols | U+002F | / | 47 | 057 | Slash (Solidus) | 0016 |
| ASCII; Digits | U+0030 | 0 | 48 | 060 | Digit Zero | 0017 |
| ASCII; Digits | U+0031 | 1 | 49 | 061 | Digit One | 0018 |
| ASCII; Digits | U+0032 | 2 | 50 | 062 | Digit Two | 0019 |
| ASCII; Digits | U+0033 | 3 | 51 | 063 | Digit Three | 0020 |
| ASCII; Digits | U+0034 | 4 | 52 | 064 | Digit Four | 0021 |
| ASCII; Digits | U+0035 | 5 | 53 | 065 | Digit Five | 0022 |
| ASCII; Digits | U+0036 | 6 | 54 | 066 | Digit Six | 0023 |
| ASCII; Digits | U+0037 | 7 | 55 | 067 | Digit Seven | 0024 |
| ASCII; Digits | U+0038 | 8 | 56 | 070 | Digit Eight | 0025 |
| ASCII; Digits | U+0039 | 9 | 57 | 071 | Digit Nine | 0026 |
| ASCII; Punctuation & Symbols | U+003A | : | 58 | 072 | Colon | 0027 |
| ASCII; Punctuation & Symbols | U+003B | ; | 59 | 073 | Semicolon | 0028 |
| ASCII; Punctuation & Symbols | U+003C | < | 60 | 074 | Less-than sign | 0029 |
| ASCII; Punctuation & Symbols | U+003D | = | 61 | 075 | Equal sign | 0030 |
| ASCII; Punctuation & Symbols | U+003E | > | 62 | 076 | Greater-than sign | 0031 |
| ASCII; Punctuation & Symbols | U+003F | ? | 63 | 077 | Question mark | 0032 |
| ASCII; Punctuation & Symbols | U+0040 | @ | 64 | 0100 | At sign | 0033 |
| Latin; Alphabet: Uppercase | U+0041 | A | 65 | 0101 | Latin Capital letter A | 0034 |
| Latin; Alphabet: Uppercase | U+0042 | B | 66 | 0102 | Latin Capital letter B | 0035 |
| Latin; Alphabet: Uppercase | U+0043 | C | 67 | 0103 | Latin Capital letter C | 0036 |
| Latin; Alphabet: Uppercase | U+0044 | D | 68 | 0104 | Latin Capital letter D | 0037 |
| Latin; Alphabet: Uppercase | U+0045 | E | 69 | 0105 | Latin Capital letter E | 0038 |
| Latin; Alphabet: Uppercase | U+0046 | F | 70 | 0106 | Latin Capital letter F | 0039 |
| Latin; Alphabet: Uppercase | U+0047 | G | 71 | 0107 | Latin Capital letter G | 0040 |
| Latin; Alphabet: Uppercase | U+0048 | H | 72 | 0110 | Latin Capital letter H | 0041 |
| Latin; Alphabet: Uppercase | U+0049 | I | 73 | 0111 | Latin Capital letter I | 0042 |
| Latin; Alphabet: Uppercase | U+004A | J | 74 | 0112 | Latin Capital letter J | 0043 |
| Latin; Alphabet: Uppercase | U+004B | K | 75 | 0113 | Latin Capital letter K | 0044 |
| Latin; Alphabet: Uppercase | U+004C | L | 76 | 0114 | Latin Capital letter L | 0045 |
| Latin; Alphabet: Uppercase | U+004D | M | 77 | 0115 | Latin Capital letter M | 0046 |
| Latin; Alphabet: Uppercase | U+004E | N | 78 | 0116 | Latin Capital letter N | 0047 |
| Latin; Alphabet: Uppercase | U+004F | O | 79 | 0117 | Latin Capital letter O | 0048 |
| Latin; Alphabet: Uppercase | U+0050 | P | 80 | 0120 | Latin Capital letter P | 0049 |
| Latin; Alphabet: Uppercase | U+0051 | Q | 81 | 0121 | Latin Capital letter Q | 0050 |
| Latin; Alphabet: Uppercase | U+0052 | R | 82 | 0122 | Latin Capital letter R | 0051 |
| Latin; Alphabet: Uppercase | U+0053 | S | 83 | 0123 | Latin Capital letter S | 0052 |
| Latin; Alphabet: Uppercase | U+0054 | T | 84 | 0124 | Latin Capital letter T | 0053 |
| Latin; Alphabet: Uppercase | U+0055 | U | 85 | 0125 | Latin Capital letter U | 0054 |
| Latin; Alphabet: Uppercase | U+0056 | V | 86 | 0126 | Latin Capital letter V | 0055 |
| Latin; Alphabet: Uppercase | U+0057 | W | 87 | 0127 | Latin Capital letter W | 0056 |
| Latin; Alphabet: Uppercase | U+0058 | X | 88 | 0130 | Latin Capital letter X | 0057 |
| Latin; Alphabet: Uppercase | U+0059 | Y | 89 | 0131 | Latin Capital letter Y | 0058 |
| Latin; Alphabet: Uppercase | U+005A | Z | 90 | 0132 | Latin Capital letter Z | 0059 |
| ASCII; Punctuation & Symbols | U+005B | [ | 91 | 0133 | Left square bracket | 0060 |
| ASCII; Punctuation & Symbols | U+005C | \ | 92 | 0134 | Backslash | 0061 |
| ASCII; Punctuation & Symbols | U+005D | ] | 93 | 0135 | Right square bracket | 0062 |
| ASCII; Punctuation & Symbols | U+005E | ^ | 94 | 0136 | Circumflex accent | 0063 |
| ASCII; Punctuation & Symbols | U+005F | _ | 95 | 0137 | Low line | 0064 |
| ASCII; Punctuation & Symbols | U+0060 | ` | 96 | 0140 | Grave accent | 0065 |
| Latin; Alphabet: Lowercase | U+0061 | a | 97 | 0141 | Latin Small Letter A | 0066 |
| Latin; Alphabet: Lowercase | U+0062 | b | 98 | 0142 | Latin Small Letter B | 0067 |
| Latin; Alphabet: Lowercase | U+0063 | c | 99 | 0143 | Latin Small Letter C | 0068 |
| Latin; Alphabet: Lowercase | U+0064 | d | 100 | 0144 | Latin Small Letter D | 0069 |
| Latin; Alphabet: Lowercase | U+0065 | e | 101 | 0145 | Latin Small Letter E | 0070 |
| Latin; Alphabet: Lowercase | U+0066 | f | 102 | 0146 | Latin Small Letter F | 0071 |
| Latin; Alphabet: Lowercase | U+0067 | g | 103 | 0147 | Latin Small Letter G | 0072 |
| Latin; Alphabet: Lowercase | U+0068 | h | 104 | 0150 | Latin Small Letter H | 0073 |
| Latin; Alphabet: Lowercase | U+0069 | i | 105 | 0151 | Latin Small Letter I | 0074 |
| Latin; Alphabet: Lowercase | U+006A | j | 106 | 0152 | Latin Small Letter J | 0075 |
| Latin; Alphabet: Lowercase | U+006B | k | 107 | 0153 | Latin Small Letter K | 0076 |
| Latin; Alphabet: Lowercase | U+006C | l | 108 | 0154 | Latin Small Letter L | 0077 |
| Latin; Alphabet: Lowercase | U+006D | m | 109 | 0155 | Latin Small Letter M | 0078 |
| Latin; Alphabet: Lowercase | U+006E | n | 110 | 0156 | Latin Small Letter N | 0079 |
| Latin; Alphabet: Lowercase | U+006F | o | 111 | 0157 | Latin Small Letter O | 0080 |
| Latin; Alphabet: Lowercase | U+0070 | p | 112 | 0160 | Latin Small Letter P | 0081 |
| Latin; Alphabet: Lowercase | U+0071 | q | 113 | 0161 | Latin Small Letter Q | 0082 |
| Latin; Alphabet: Lowercase | U+0072 | r | 114 | 0162 | Latin Small Letter R | 0083 |
| Latin; Alphabet: Lowercase | U+0073 | s | 115 | 0163 | Latin Small Letter S | 0084 |
| Latin; Alphabet: Lowercase | U+0074 | t | 116 | 0164 | Latin Small Letter T | 0085 |
| Latin; Alphabet: Lowercase | U+0075 | u | 117 | 0165 | Latin Small Letter U | 0086 |
| Latin; Alphabet: Lowercase | U+0076 | v | 118 | 0166 | Latin Small Letter V | 0087 |
| Latin; Alphabet: Lowercase | U+0077 | w | 119 | 0167 | Latin Small Letter W | 0088 |
| Latin; Alphabet: Lowercase | U+0078 | x | 120 | 0170 | Latin Small Letter X | 0089 |
| Latin; Alphabet: Lowercase | U+0079 | y | 121 | 0171 | Latin Small Letter Y | 0090 |
| Latin; Alphabet: Lowercase | U+007A | z | 122 | 0172 | Latin Small Letter Z | 0091 |
| ASCII; Punctuation & Symbols | U+007B | { | 123 | 0173 | Left curly bracket | 0092 |
| ASCII; Punctuation & Symbols | U+007C | | | 124 | 0174 | Vertical bar | 0093 |
| ASCII; Punctuation & Symbols | U+007D | } | 125 | 0175 | Right curly bracket | 0094 |
| ASCII; Punctuation & Symbols | U+007E | ~ | 126 | 0176 | Tilde | 0095 |
| | Code | Glyph | Decimal | Octal | Description | # |

==== Latin-1 Supplement ====
96 characters; the 62 letters, and two ordinal indicators belong to the Latin script. The remaining 32 belong to the common script.

| | Code | Glyph | Decimal | Octal | HTML | Description | # |
|---|---|---|---|---|---|---|---|
| Latin-1; Punctuation & Symbols | U+00A0 | | 160 | 0302 0240 | &nbsp; | Non-breaking space | 0096 |
| Latin-1; Punctuation & Symbols | U+00A1 | ¡ | 161 | 0302 0241 | &iexcl; | Inverted Exclamation Mark | 0097 |
| Latin-1; Punctuation & Symbols | U+00A2 | ¢ | 162 | 0302 0242 | &cent; | Cent sign | 0098 |
| Latin-1; Punctuation & Symbols | U+00A3 | £ | 163 | 0302 0243 | &pound; | Pound sign | 0099 |
| Latin-1; Punctuation & Symbols | U+00A4 | ¤ | 164 | 0302 0244 | &curren; | Currency sign | 0100 |
| Latin-1; Punctuation & Symbols | U+00A5 | ¥ | 165 | 0302 0245 | &yen; | Yen sign | 0101 |
| Latin-1; Punctuation & Symbols | U+00A6 | ¦ | 166 | 0302 0246 | &brvbar; | Broken bar | 0102 |
| Latin-1; Punctuation & Symbols | U+00A7 | § | 167 | 0302 0247 | &sect; | Section sign | 0103 |
| Latin-1; Punctuation & Symbols | U+00A8 | ¨ | 168 | 0302 0250 | &uml; | Diaeresis (Umlaut) | 0104 |
| Latin-1; Punctuation & Symbols | U+00A9 | © | 169 | 0302 0251 | &copy; | Copyright symbol | 0105 |
| Latin-1; Punctuation & Symbols | U+00AA | ª | 170 | 0302 0252 | &ordf; | Feminine Ordinal Indicator | 0106 |
| Latin-1; Punctuation & Symbols | U+00AB | « | 171 | 0302 0253 | &laquo; | Left-pointing double angle quotation mark | 0107 |
| Latin-1; Punctuation & Symbols | U+00AC | ¬ | 172 | 0302 0254 | &not; | Not sign | 0108 |
| Latin-1; Punctuation & Symbols | U+00AD | | 173 | 0302 0255 | &shy; | Soft hyphen | 0109 |
| Latin-1; Punctuation & Symbols | U+00AE | ® | 174 | 0302 0256 | &reg; | Registered trademark symbol | 0110 |
| Latin-1; Punctuation & Symbols | U+00AF | ¯ | 175 | 0302 0257 | &macr; | Macron | 0111 |
| Latin-1; Punctuation & Symbols | U+00B0 | ° | 176 | 0302 0260 | &deg; | Degree sign | 0112 |
| Latin-1; Punctuation & Symbols | U+00B1 | ± | 177 | 0302 0261 | &plusmn; | Plus–minus sign | 0113 |
| Latin-1; Punctuation & Symbols | U+00B2 | ² | 178 | 0302 0262 | &sup2; | Superscript two | 0114 |
| Latin-1; Punctuation & Symbols | U+00B3 | ³ | 179 | 0302 0263 | &sup3; | Superscript three | 0115 |
| Latin-1; Punctuation & Symbols | U+00B4 | ´ | 180 | 0302 0264 | &acute; | Acute accent | 0116 |
| Latin-1; Punctuation & Symbols | U+00B5 | µ | 181 | 0302 0265 | &micro; | Micro sign | 0117 |
| Latin-1; Punctuation & Symbols | U+00B6 | ¶ | 182 | 0302 0266 | &para; | Pilcrow sign | 0118 |
| Latin-1; Punctuation & Symbols | U+00B7 | · | 183 | 0302 0267 | &middot; | Middle dot | 0119 |
| Latin-1; Punctuation & Symbols | U+00B8 | ¸ | 184 | 0302 0270 | &cedil; | Cedilla | 0120 |
| Latin-1; Punctuation & Symbols | U+00B9 | ¹ | 185 | 0302 0271 | &sup1; | Superscript one | 0121 |
| Latin-1; Punctuation & Symbols | U+00BA | º | 186 | 0302 0272 | &ordm; | Masculine ordinal indicator | 0122 |
| Latin-1; Punctuation & Symbols | U+00BB | » | 187 | 0302 0273 | &raquo; | Right-pointing double angle quotation mark | 0123 |
| Latin-1; Punctuation & Symbols | U+00BC | ¼ | 188 | 0302 0274 | &frac14; | Vulgar fraction one quarter | 0124 |
| Latin-1; Punctuation & Symbols | U+00BD | ½ | 189 | 0302 0275 | &frac12; | Vulgar fraction one half | 0125 |
| Latin-1; Punctuation & Symbols | U+00BE | ¾ | 190 | 0302 0276 | &frac34; | Vulgar fraction three quarters | 0126 |
| Latin-1; Punctuation & Symbols | U+00BF | ¿ | 191 | 0302 0277 | &iquest; | Inverted Question Mark | 0127 |
| Letters: Uppercase | U+00C0 | À | 192 | 0303 0200 | &Agrave; | Latin Capital Letter A with grave | 0128 |
| Letters: Uppercase | U+00C1 | Á | 193 | 0303 0201 | &Aacute; | Latin Capital letter A with acute | 0129 |
| Letters: Uppercase | U+00C2 | Â | 194 | 0303 0202 | &Acirc; | Latin Capital letter A with circumflex | 0130 |
| Letters: Uppercase | U+00C3 | Ã | 195 | 0303 0203 | &Atilde; | Latin Capital letter A with tilde | 0131 |
| Letters: Uppercase | U+00C4 | Ä | 196 | 0303 0204 | &Auml; | Latin Capital letter A with diaeresis | 0132 |
| Letters: Uppercase | U+00C5 | Å | 197 | 0303 0205 | &Aring; | Latin Capital letter A with ring above | 0133 |
| Letters: Uppercase | U+00C6 | Æ | 198 | 0303 0206 | &AElig; | Latin Capital letter Æ | 0134 |
| Letters: Uppercase | U+00C7 | Ç | 199 | 0303 0207 | &Ccedil; | Latin Capital letter C with cedilla | 0135 |
| Letters: Uppercase | U+00C8 | È | 200 | 0303 0210 | &Egrave; | Latin Capital letter E with grave | 0136 |
| Letters: Uppercase | U+00C9 | É | 201 | 0303 0211 | &Eacute; | Latin Capital letter E with acute | 0137 |
| Letters: Uppercase | U+00CA | Ê | 202 | 0303 0212 | &Ecirc; | Latin Capital letter E with circumflex | 0138 |
| Letters: Uppercase | U+00CB | Ë | 203 | 0303 0213 | &Euml; | Latin Capital letter E with diaeresis | 0139 |
| Letters: Uppercase | U+00CC | Ì | 204 | 0303 0214 | &Igrave; | Latin Capital letter I with grave | 0140 |
| Letters: Uppercase | U+00CD | Í | 205 | 0303 0215 | &Iacute; | Latin Capital letter I with acute | 0141 |
| Letters: Uppercase | U+00CE | Î | 206 | 0303 0216 | &Icirc; | Latin Capital letter I with circumflex | 0142 |
| Letters: Uppercase | U+00CF | Ï | 207 | 0303 0217 | &Iuml; | Latin Capital letter I with diaeresis | 0143 |
| Letters: Uppercase | U+00D0 | Ð | 208 | 0303 0220 | &ETH; | Latin Capital letter Eth | 0144 |
| Letters: Uppercase | U+00D1 | Ñ | 209 | 0303 0221 | &Ntilde; | Latin Capital letter N with tilde | 0145 |
| Letters: Uppercase | U+00D2 | Ò | 210 | 0303 0222 | &Ograve; | Latin Capital letter O with grave | 0146 |
| Letters: Uppercase | U+00D3 | Ó | 211 | 0303 0223 | &Oacute; | Latin Capital letter O with acute | 0147 |
| Letters: Uppercase | U+00D4 | Ô | 212 | 0303 0224 | &Ocirc; | Latin Capital letter O with circumflex | 0148 |
| Letters: Uppercase | U+00D5 | Õ | 213 | 0303 0225 | &Otilde; | Latin Capital letter O with tilde | 0149 |
| Letters: Uppercase | U+00D6 | Ö | 214 | 0303 0226 | &Ouml; | Latin Capital letter O with diaeresis | 0150 |
| Math | U+00D7 | × | 215 | 0303 0227 | &times; | Multiplication sign | 0151 |
| Letters: Uppercase | U+00D8 | Ø | 216 | 0303 0230 | &Oslash; | Latin Capital letter O with stroke | 0152 |
| Letters: Uppercase | U+00D9 | Ù | 217 | 0303 0231 | &Ugrave; | Latin Capital letter U with grave | 0153 |
| Letters: Uppercase | U+00DA | Ú | 218 | 0303 0232 | &Uacute; | Latin Capital letter U with acute | 0154 |
| Letters: Uppercase | U+00DB | Û | 219 | 0303 0233 | &Ucirc; | Latin Capital Letter U with circumflex | 0155 |
| Letters: Uppercase | U+00DC | Ü | 220 | 0303 0234 | &Uuml; | Latin Capital Letter U with diaeresis | 0156 |
| Letters: Uppercase | U+00DD | Ý | 221 | 0303 0235 | &Yacute; | Latin Capital Letter Y with acute | 0157 |
| Letters: Uppercase | U+00DE | Þ | 222 | 0303 0236 | &THORN; | Latin Capital Letter Thorn | 0158 |
| Letters: Lowercase | U+00DF | ß | 223 | 0303 0237 | &szlig; | Latin Small Letter sharp S | 0159 |
| Letters: Lowercase | U+00E0 | à | 224 | 0303 0240 | &agrave; | Latin Small Letter A with grave | 0160 |
| Letters: Lowercase | U+00E1 | á | 225 | 0303 0241 | &aacute; | Latin Small Letter A with acute | 0161 |
| Letters: Lowercase | U+00E2 | â | 226 | 0303 0242 | &acirc; | Latin Small Letter A with circumflex | 0162 |
| Letters: Lowercase | U+00E3 | ã | 227 | 0303 0243 | &atilde; | Latin Small Letter A with tilde | 0163 |
| Letters: Lowercase | U+00E4 | ä | 228 | 0303 0244 | &auml; | Latin Small Letter A with diaeresis | 0164 |
| Letters: Lowercase | U+00E5 | å | 229 | 0303 0245 | &aring; | Latin Small Letter A with ring above | 0165 |
| Letters: Lowercase | U+00E6 | æ | 230 | 0303 0246 | &aelig; | Latin Small Letter Æ | 0166 |
| Letters: Lowercase | U+00E7 | ç | 231 | 0303 0247 | &ccedil; | Latin Small Letter C with cedilla | 0167 |
| Letters: Lowercase | U+00E8 | è | 232 | 0303 0250 | &egrave; | Latin Small Letter E with grave | 0168 |
| Letters: Lowercase | U+00E9 | é | 233 | 0303 0251 | &eacute; | Latin Small Letter E with acute | 0169 |
| Letters: Lowercase | U+00EA | ê | 234 | 0303 0252 | &ecirc; | Latin Small Letter E with circumflex | 0170 |
| Letters: Lowercase | U+00EB | ë | 235 | 0303 0253 | &euml; | Latin Small Letter E with diaeresis | 0171 |
| Letters: Lowercase | U+00EC | ì | 236 | 0303 0254 | &igrave; | Latin Small Letter I with grave | 0172 |
| Letters: Lowercase | U+00ED | í | 237 | 0303 0255 | &iacute; | Latin Small Letter I with acute | 0173 |
| Letters: Lowercase | U+00EE | î | 238 | 0303 0256 | &icirc; | Latin Small Letter I with circumflex | 0174 |
| Letters: Lowercase | U+00EF | ï | 239 | 0303 0257 | &iuml; | Latin Small Letter I with diaeresis | 0175 |
| Letters: Lowercase | U+00F0 | ð | 240 | 0303 0260 | &eth; | Latin Small Letter Eth | 0176 |
| Letters: Lowercase | U+00F1 | ñ | 241 | 0303 0261 | &ntilde; | Latin Small Letter N with tilde | 0177 |
| Letters: Lowercase | U+00F2 | ò | 242 | 0303 0262 | &ograve; | Latin Small Letter O with grave | 0178 |
| Letters: Lowercase | U+00F3 | ó | 243 | 0303 0263 | &oacute; | Latin Small Letter O with acute | 0179 |
| Letters: Lowercase | U+00F4 | ô | 244 | 0303 0264 | &ocirc; | Latin Small Letter O with circumflex | 0180 |
| Letters: Lowercase | U+00F5 | õ | 245 | 0303 0265 | &otilde; | Latin Small Letter O with tilde | 0181 |
| Letters: Lowercase | U+00F6 | ö | 246 | 0303 0266 | &ouml; | Latin Small Letter O with diaeresis | 0182 |
| Math | U+00F7 | ÷ | 247 | 0303 0267 | &divide; | Division sign | 0183 |
| Letters: Lowercase | U+00F8 | ø | 248 | 0303 0270 | &oslash; | Latin Small Letter O with stroke | 0184 |
| Letters: Lowercase | U+00F9 | ù | 249 | 0303 0271 | &ugrave; | Latin Small Letter U with grave | 0185 |
| Letters: Lowercase | U+00FA | ú | 250 | 0303 0272 | &uacute; | Latin Small Letter U with acute | 0186 |
| Letters: Lowercase | U+00FB | û | 251 | 0303 0273 | &ucirc; | Latin Small Letter U with circumflex | 0187 |
| Letters: Lowercase | U+00FC | ü | 252 | 0303 0274 | &uuml; | Latin Small Letter U with diaeresis | 0188 |
| Letters: Lowercase | U+00FD | ý | 253 | 0303 0275 | &yacute; | Latin Small Letter Y with acute | 0189 |
| Letters: Lowercase | U+00FE | þ | 254 | 0303 0276 | &thorn; | Latin Small Letter Thorn | 0190 |
| Letters: Lowercase | U+00FF | ÿ | 255 | 0303 0277 | &yuml; | Latin Small Letter Y with diaeresis | 0191 |
| | Code | Glyph | Decimal | Octal | HTML | Description | # |

==== Latin Extended-A ====
128 characters; all belong to the Latin script.

| | Code | Glyph | Decimal | HTML | Description | # |
|---|---|---|---|---|---|---|
| European; Latin | U+0100 | Ā | 256 | &Amacr; | Latin Capital Letter A with macron | 0192 |
| European; Latin | U+0101 | ā | 257 | &amacr; | Latin Small Letter A with macron | 0193 |
| European; Latin | U+0102 | Ă | 258 | &Abreve; | Latin Capital Letter A with breve | 0194 |
| European; Latin | U+0103 | ă | 259 | &abreve; | Latin Small Letter A with breve | 0195 |
| European; Latin | U+0104 | Ą | 260 | &Aogon; | Latin Capital Letter A with ogonek | 0196 |
| European; Latin | U+0105 | ą | 261 | &aogon; | Latin Small Letter A with ogonek | 0197 |
| European; Latin | U+0106 | Ć | 262 | &Cacute; | Latin Capital Letter C with acute | 0198 |
| European; Latin | U+0107 | ć | 263 | &cacute; | Latin Small Letter C with acute | 0199 |
| European; Latin | U+0108 | Ĉ | 264 | &Ccirc; | Latin Capital Letter C with circumflex | 0200 |
| European; Latin | U+0109 | ĉ | 265 | &ccirc; | Latin Small Letter C with circumflex | 0201 |
| European; Latin | U+010A | Ċ | 266 | &Cdot; | Latin Capital Letter C with dot above | 0202 |
| European; Latin | U+010B | ċ | 267 | &cdot; | Latin Small Letter C with dot above | 0203 |
| European; Latin | U+010C | Č | 268 | &Ccaron; | Latin Capital Letter C with caron | 0204 |
| European; Latin | U+010D | č | 269 | &ccaron; | Latin Small Letter C with caron | 0205 |
| European; Latin | U+010E | Ď | 270 | &Dcaron; | Latin Capital Letter D with caron | 0206 |
| European; Latin | U+010F | ď | 271 | &dcaron; | Latin Small Letter D with caron | 0207 |
| European; Latin | U+0110 | Đ | 272 | &Dstrok; | Latin Capital Letter D with stroke | 0208 |
| European; Latin | U+0111 | đ | 273 | &dstrok; | Latin Small Letter D with stroke | 0209 |
| European; Latin | U+0112 | Ē | 274 | &Emacr; | Latin Capital Letter E with macron | 0210 |
| European; Latin | U+0113 | ē | 275 | &emacr; | Latin Small Letter E with macron | 0211 |
| European; Latin | U+0114 | Ĕ | 276 | &Ebreve; | Latin Capital Letter E with breve | 0212 |
| European; Latin | U+0115 | ĕ | 277 | &ebreve; | Latin Small Letter E with breve | 0213 |
| European; Latin | U+0116 | Ė | 278 | &Edot; | Latin Capital Letter E with dot above | 0214 |
| European; Latin | U+0117 | ė | 279 | &edot; | Latin Small Letter E with dot above | 0215 |
| European; Latin | U+0118 | Ę | 280 | &Eogon; | Latin Capital Letter E with ogonek | 0216 |
| European; Latin | U+0119 | ę | 281 | &eogon; | Latin Small Letter E with ogonek | 0217 |
| European; Latin | U+011A | Ě | 282 | &Ecaron; | Latin Capital Letter E with caron | 0218 |
| European; Latin | U+011B | ě | 283 | &ecaron; | Latin Small Letter E with caron | 0219 |
| European; Latin | U+011C | Ĝ | 284 | &Gcirc; | Latin Capital Letter G with circumflex | 0220 |
| European; Latin | U+011D | ĝ | 285 | &gcirc; | Latin Small Letter G with circumflex | 0221 |
| European; Latin | U+011E | Ğ | 286 | &Gbreve; | Latin Capital Letter G with breve | 0222 |
| European; Latin | U+011F | ğ | 287 | &gbreve; | Latin Small Letter G with breve | 0223 |
| European; Latin | U+0120 | Ġ | 288 | &Gdot; | Latin Capital Letter G with dot above | 0224 |
| European; Latin | U+0121 | ġ | 289 | &gdot; | Latin Small Letter G with dot above | 0225 |
| European; Latin | U+0122 | Ģ | 290 | &Gcedil; | Latin Capital Letter G with cedilla | 0226 |
| European; Latin | U+0123 | ģ | 291 | &gcedil; | Latin Small Letter G with cedilla | 0227 |
| European; Latin | U+0124 | Ĥ | 292 | &Hcirc; | Latin Capital Letter H with circumflex | 0228 |
| European; Latin | U+0125 | ĥ | 293 | &hcirc; | Latin Small Letter H with circumflex | 0229 |
| European; Latin | U+0126 | Ħ | 294 | &Hstrok; | Latin Capital Letter H with stroke | 0230 |
| European; Latin | U+0127 | ħ | 295 | &hstrok; | Latin Small Letter H with stroke | 0231 |
| European; Latin | U+0128 | Ĩ | 296 | &Itilde; | Latin Capital Letter I with tilde | 0232 |
| European; Latin | U+0129 | ĩ | 297 | &itilde; | Latin Small Letter I with tilde | 0233 |
| European; Latin | U+012A | Ī | 298 | &Imacr; | Latin Capital Letter I with macron | 0234 |
| European; Latin | U+012B | ī | 299 | &imacr; | Latin Small Letter I with macron | 0235 |
| European; Latin | U+012C | Ĭ | 300 | &Ibreve; | Latin Capital Letter I with breve | 0236 |
| European; Latin | U+012D | ĭ | 301 | &ibreve; | Latin Small Letter I with breve | 0237 |
| European; Latin | U+012E | Į | 302 | &Iogon; | Latin Capital Letter I with ogonek | 0238 |
| European; Latin | U+012F | į | 303 | &iogon; | Latin Small Letter I with ogonek | 0239 |
| European; Latin | U+0130 | İ | 304 | &Idot; | Latin Capital Letter I with dot above | 0240 |
| European; Latin | U+0131 | ı | 305 | &inodot; | Latin Small Letter dotless I | 0241 |
| European; Latin | U+0132 | Ĳ | 306 | &IJlig; | Latin Capital Ligature IJ | 0242 |
| European; Latin | U+0133 | ĳ | 307 | &ijlig; | Latin Small Ligature IJ | 0243 |
| European; Latin | U+0134 | Ĵ | 308 | &Jcirc; | Latin Capital Letter J with circumflex | 0244 |
| European; Latin | U+0135 | ĵ | 309 | &jcirc; | Latin Small Letter J with circumflex | 0245 |
| European; Latin | U+0136 | Ķ | 310 | &Kcedil; | Latin Capital Letter K with cedilla | 0246 |
| European; Latin | U+0137 | ķ | 311 | &kcedil; | Latin Small Letter K with cedilla | 0247 |
| European; Latin | U+0138 | ĸ | 312 | &kgreen; | Latin Small Letter Kra | 0248 |
| European; Latin | U+0139 | Ĺ | 313 | &Lacute; | Latin Capital Letter L with acute | 0249 |
| European; Latin | U+013A | ĺ | 314 | &lacute; | Latin Small Letter L with acute | 0250 |
| European; Latin | U+013B | Ļ | 315 | &Lcedil; | Latin Capital Letter L with cedilla | 0251 |
| European; Latin | U+013C | ļ | 316 | &lcedil; | Latin Small Letter L with cedilla | 0252 |
| European; Latin | U+013D | Ľ | 317 | &Lcaron; | Latin Capital Letter L with caron | 0253 |
| European; Latin | U+013E | ľ | 318 | &lcaron; | Latin Small Letter L with caron | 0254 |
| European; Latin | U+013F | Ŀ | 319 | &Lmidot; | Latin Capital Letter L with middle dot | 0255 |
| European; Latin | U+0140 | ŀ | 320 | &lmidot; | Latin Small Letter L with middle dot | 0256 |
| European; Latin | U+0141 | Ł | 321 | &Lstrok; | Latin Capital Letter L with stroke | 0257 |
| European; Latin | U+0142 | ł | 322 | &lstrok; | Latin Small Letter L with stroke | 0258 |
| European; Latin | U+0143 | Ń | 323 | &Nacute; | Latin Capital Letter N with acute | 0259 |
| European; Latin | U+0144 | ń | 324 | &nacute; | Latin Small Letter N with acute | 0260 |
| European; Latin | U+0145 | Ņ | 325 | &Ncedil; | Latin Capital Letter N with cedilla | 0261 |
| European; Latin | U+0146 | ņ | 326 | &ncedil; | Latin Small Letter N with cedilla | 0262 |
| European; Latin | U+0147 | Ň | 327 | &Ncaron; | Latin Capital Letter N with caron | 0263 |
| European; Latin | U+0148 | ň | 328 | &ncaron; | Latin Small Letter N with caron | 0264 |
| Deprecated | U+0149 | ŉ | 329 | &napos; | Latin Small Letter N preceded by apostrophe | 0265 |
| European; Latin | U+014A | Ŋ | 330 | &ENG; | Latin Capital Letter Eng | 0266 |
| European; Latin | U+014B | ŋ | 331 | &eng; | Latin Small Letter Eng | 0267 |
| European; Latin | U+014C | Ō | 332 | &Omacr; | Latin Capital Letter O with macron | 0268 |
| European; Latin | U+014D | ō | 333 | &omacr; | Latin Small Letter O with macron | 0269 |
| European; Latin | U+014E | Ŏ | 334 | &Obreve; | Latin Capital Letter O with breve | 0270 |
| European; Latin | U+014F | ŏ | 335 | &obreve; | Latin Small Letter O with breve | 0271 |
| European; Latin | U+0150 | Ő | 336 | &Odblac; | Latin Capital Letter O with double acute | 0272 |
| European; Latin | U+0151 | ő | 337 | &odblac; | Latin Small Letter O with double acute | 0273 |
| European; Latin | U+0152 | Œ | 338 | &OElig; | Latin Capital Ligature OE | 0274 |
| European; Latin | U+0153 | œ | 339 | &oelig; | Latin Small Ligature OE | 0275 |
| European; Latin | U+0154 | Ŕ | 340 | &Racute; | Latin Capital Letter R with acute | 0276 |
| European; Latin | U+0155 | ŕ | 341 | &racute; | Latin Small Letter R with acute | 0277 |
| European; Latin | U+0156 | Ŗ | 342 | &Rcedil; | Latin Capital Letter R with cedilla | 0278 |
| European; Latin | U+0157 | ŗ | 343 | &rcedil; | Latin Small Letter R with cedilla | 0279 |
| European; Latin | U+0158 | Ř | 344 | &Rcaron; | Latin Capital Letter R with caron | 0280 |
| European; Latin | U+0159 | ř | 345 | &rcaron; | Latin Small Letter R with caron | 0281 |
| European; Latin | U+015A | Ś | 346 | &Sacute; | Latin Capital Letter S with acute | 0282 |
| European; Latin | U+015B | ś | 347 | &sacute; | Latin Small Letter S with acute | 0283 |
| European; Latin | U+015C | Ŝ | 348 | &Scirc; | Latin Capital Letter S with circumflex | 0284 |
| European; Latin | U+015D | ŝ | 349 | &scirc; | Latin Small Letter S with circumflex | 0285 |
| European; Latin | U+015E | Ş | 350 | &Scedil; | Latin Capital Letter S with cedilla | 0286 |
| European; Latin | U+015F | ş | 351 | &scedil; | Latin Small Letter S with cedilla | 0287 |
| European; Latin | U+0160 | Š | 352 | &Scaron; | Latin Capital Letter S with caron | 0288 |
| European; Latin | U+0161 | š | 353 | &scaron; | Latin Small Letter S with caron | 0289 |
| European; Latin | U+0162 | Ţ | 354 | &Tcedil; | Latin Capital Letter T with cedilla | 0290 |
| European; Latin | U+0163 | ţ | 355 | &tcedil; | Latin Small Letter T with cedilla | 0291 |
| European; Latin | U+0164 | Ť | 356 | &Tcaron; | Latin Capital Letter T with caron | 0292 |
| European; Latin | U+0165 | ť | 357 | &tcaron; | Latin Small Letter T with caron | 0293 |
| European; Latin | U+0166 | Ŧ | 358 | &Tstrok; | Latin Capital Letter T with stroke | 0294 |
| European; Latin | U+0167 | ŧ | 359 | &tstrok; | Latin Small Letter T with stroke | 0295 |
| European; Latin | U+0168 | Ũ | 360 | &Utilde; | Latin Capital Letter U with tilde | 0296 |
| European; Latin | U+0169 | ũ | 361 | &utilde; | Latin Small Letter U with tilde | 0297 |
| European; Latin | U+016A | Ū | 362 | &Umacr; | Latin Capital Letter U with macron | 0298 |
| European; Latin | U+016B | ū | 363 | &umacr; | Latin Small Letter U with macron | 0299 |
| European; Latin | U+016C | Ŭ | 364 | &Ubreve; | Latin Capital Letter U with breve | 0300 |
| European; Latin | U+016D | ŭ | 365 | &ubreve; | Latin Small Letter U with breve | 0301 |
| European; Latin | U+016E | Ů | 366 | &Uring; | Latin Capital Letter U with ring above | 0302 |
| European; Latin | U+016F | ů | 367 | &uring; | Latin Small Letter U with ring above | 0303 |
| European; Latin | U+0170 | Ű | 368 | &Udblac; | Latin Capital Letter U with double acute | 0304 |
| European; Latin | U+0171 | ű | 369 | &udblac; | Latin Small Letter U with double acute | 0305 |
| European; Latin | U+0172 | Ų | 370 | &Uogon; | Latin Capital Letter U with ogonek | 0306 |
| European; Latin | U+0173 | ų | 371 | &uogon; | Latin Small Letter U with ogonek | 0307 |
| European; Latin | U+0174 | Ŵ | 372 | &Wcirc; | Latin Capital Letter W with circumflex | 0308 |
| European; Latin | U+0175 | ŵ | 373 | &wcirc; | Latin Small Letter W with circumflex | 0309 |
| European; Latin | U+0176 | Ŷ | 374 | &Ycirc; | Latin Capital Letter Y with circumflex | 0310 |
| European; Latin | U+0177 | ŷ | 375 | &ycirc; | Latin Small Letter Y with circumflex | 0311 |
| European; Latin | U+0178 | Ÿ | 376 | &Yuml; | Latin Capital Letter Y with diaeresis | 0312 |
| European; Latin | U+0179 | Ź | 377 | &Zacute; | Latin Capital Letter Z with acute | 0313 |
| European; Latin | U+017A | ź | 378 | &zacute; | Latin Small Letter Z with acute | 0314 |
| European; Latin | U+017B | Ż | 379 | &Zdot; | Latin Capital Letter Z with dot above | 0315 |
| European; Latin | U+017C | ż | 380 | &zdot; | Latin Small Letter Z with dot above | 0316 |
| European; Latin | U+017D | Ž | 381 | &Zcaron; | Latin Capital Letter Z with caron | 0317 |
| European; Latin | U+017E | ž | 382 | &zcaron; | Latin Small Letter Z with caron | 0318 |
| European; Latin | U+017F | ſ | 383 | | Latin Small Letter long S | 0319 |
| | Code | Glyph | Decimal | HTML | Description | # |

==== Latin Extended-B ====
208 characters; all belong to the Latin script; 33 in the MES-2 subset.

| | Code | Glyph | Decimal | Description | # | MES-2 Rationale |
|---|---|---|---|---|---|---|
| Non-European & historic Latin | U+0180 | ƀ | 384 | Latin Small Letter B with stroke | · | |
| Non-European & historic Latin | U+0181 | Ɓ | 385 | Latin Capital Letter B with hook | · | |
| Non-European & historic Latin | U+0182 | Ƃ | 386 | Latin Capital Letter B with top bar | · | |
| Non-European & historic Latin | U+0183 | ƃ | 387 | Latin Small Letter B with top bar | · | |
| Non-European & historic Latin | U+0184 | Ƅ | 388 | Latin Capital Letter Tone Six | · | |
| Non-European & historic Latin | U+0185 | ƅ | 389 | Latin Small Letter Tone Six | · | |
| Non-European & historic Latin | U+0186 | Ɔ | 390 | Latin Capital Letter Open O | · | |
| Non-European & historic Latin | U+0187 | Ƈ | 391 | Latin Capital Letter C with hook | · | |
| Non-European & historic Latin | U+0188 | ƈ | 392 | Latin Small Letter C with hook | · | |
| Non-European & historic Latin | U+0189 | Ɖ | 393 | Latin Capital Letter African D | · | |
| Non-European & historic Latin | U+018A | Ɗ | 394 | Latin Capital Letter D with hook | · | |
| Non-European & historic Latin | U+018B | Ƌ | 395 | Latin Capital Letter D with top bar | · | |
| Non-European & historic Latin | U+018C | ƌ | 396 | Latin Small Letter D with top bar | · | |
| Non-European & historic Latin | U+018D | ƍ | 397 | Latin Small Letter Turned Delta | · | |
| Non-European & historic Latin | U+018E | Ǝ | 398 | Latin Capital Letter Reversed E | · | |
| Non-European & historic Latin | U+018F | Ə | 399 | Latin Capital Letter Schwa | 0320 | for Azerbaijani |
| Non-European & historic Latin | U+0190 | Ɛ | 400 | Latin Capital Letter Open E | · | |
| Non-European & historic Latin | U+0191 | Ƒ | 401 | Latin Capital Letter F with hook | · | |
| Non-European & historic Latin | U+0192 | ƒ | 402 | Latin Small Letter F with hook | 0321 | in WGL4 |
| Non-European & historic Latin | U+0193 | Ɠ | 403 | Latin Capital Letter G with hook | · | |
| Non-European & historic Latin | U+0194 | Ɣ | 404 | Latin Capital Letter Gamma | · | |
| Non-European & historic Latin | U+0195 | ƕ | 405 | Latin Small Letter HV | · | |
| Non-European & historic Latin | U+0196 | Ɩ | 406 | Latin Capital Letter Iota | · | |
| Non-European & historic Latin | U+0197 | Ɨ | 407 | Latin Capital Letter I with stroke | · | |
| Non-European & historic Latin | U+0198 | Ƙ | 408 | Latin Capital Letter K with hook | · | |
| Non-European & historic Latin | U+0199 | ƙ | 409 | Latin Small Letter K with hook | · | |
| Non-European & historic Latin | U+019A | ƚ | 410 | Latin Small Letter L with bar | · | |
| Non-European & historic Latin | U+019B | ƛ | 411 | Latin Small Letter Lambda with stroke | · | |
| Non-European & historic Latin | U+019C | Ɯ | 412 | Latin Capital Letter Turned M | · | |
| Non-European & historic Latin | U+019D | Ɲ | 413 | Latin Capital Letter N with left hook | · | |
| Non-European & historic Latin | U+019E | ƞ | 414 | Latin Small Letter N with long right leg | · | |
| Non-European & historic Latin | U+019F | Ɵ | 415 | Latin Capital Letter O with middle tilde | · | |
| Non-European & historic Latin | U+01A0 | Ơ | 416 | Latin Capital Letter O with horn | · | |
| Non-European & historic Latin | U+01A1 | ơ | 417 | Latin Small Letter O with horn | · | |
| Non-European & historic Latin | U+01A2 | Ƣ | 418 | Latin Capital Letter OI (= Latin Capital Letter Gha) | · | |
| Non-European & historic Latin | U+01A3 | ƣ | 419 | Latin Small Letter OI (= Latin Small Letter Gha) | · | |
| Non-European & historic Latin | U+01A4 | Ƥ | 420 | Latin Capital Letter P with hook | · | |
| Non-European & historic Latin | U+01A5 | ƥ | 421 | Latin Small Letter P with hook | · | |
| Non-European & historic Latin | U+01A6 | Ʀ | 422 | Latin Letter YR | · | |
| Non-European & historic Latin | U+01A7 | Ƨ | 423 | Latin Capital Letter Tone Two | · | |
| Non-European & historic Latin | U+01A8 | ƨ | 424 | Latin Small Letter Tone Two | · | |
| Non-European & historic Latin | U+01A9 | Ʃ | 425 | Latin Capital Letter Esh | · | |
| Non-European & historic Latin | U+01AA | ƪ | 426 | Latin Letter Reversed Esh Loop | · | |
| Non-European & historic Latin | U+01AB | ƫ | 427 | Latin Small Letter T with palatal hook | · | |
| Non-European & historic Latin | U+01AC | Ƭ | 428 | Latin Capital Letter T with hook | · | |
| Non-European & historic Latin | U+01AD | ƭ | 429 | Latin Small Letter T with hook | · | |
| Non-European & historic Latin | U+01AE | Ʈ | 430 | Latin Capital Letter T with retroflex hook | · | |
| Non-European & historic Latin | U+01AF | Ư | 431 | Latin Capital Letter U with horn | · | |
| Non-European & historic Latin | U+01B0 | ư | 432 | Latin Small Letter U with horn | · | |
| Non-European & historic Latin | U+01B1 | Ʊ | 433 | Latin Capital Letter Upsilon | · | |
| Non-European & historic Latin | U+01B2 | Ʋ | 434 | Latin Capital Letter V with hook | · | |
| Non-European & historic Latin | U+01B3 | Ƴ | 435 | Latin Capital Letter Y with hook | · | |
| Non-European & historic Latin | U+01B4 | ƴ | 436 | Latin Small Letter Y with hook | · | |
| Non-European & historic Latin | U+01B5 | Ƶ | 437 | Latin Capital Letter Z with stroke | · | |
| Non-European & historic Latin | U+01B6 | ƶ | 438 | Latin Small Letter Z with stroke | · | |
| Non-European & historic Latin | U+01B7 | Ʒ | 439 | Latin Capital Letter Ezh | 0322 | for Sami |
| Non-European & historic Latin | U+01B8 | Ƹ | 440 | Latin Capital Letter Ezh reversed | · | |
| Non-European & historic Latin | U+01B9 | ƹ | 441 | Latin Small Letter Ezh reversed | · | |
| Non-European & historic Latin | U+01BA | ƺ | 442 | Latin Small Letter Ezh with tail | · | |
| Non-European & historic Latin | U+01BB | ƻ | 443 | Latin Letter Two with stroke | · | |
| Non-European & historic Latin | U+01BC | Ƽ | 444 | Latin Capital Letter Tone Five | · | |
| Non-European & historic Latin | U+01BD | ƽ | 445 | Latin Small Letter Tone Five | · | |
| Non-European & historic Latin | U+01BE | ƾ | 446 | Latin Letter Inverted Glottal Stop with stroke | · | |
| Non-European & historic Latin | U+01BF | ƿ | 447 | Latin Letter Wynn | · | |
| African clicks | U+01C0 | ǀ | 448 | Latin Letter Dental Click | · | |
| African clicks | U+01C1 | ǁ | 449 | Latin Letter Lateral Click | · | |
| African clicks | U+01C2 | ǂ | 450 | Latin Letter Alveolar Click | · | |
| African clicks | U+01C3 | ǃ | 451 | Latin Letter Retroflex Click | · | |
| Croatian | U+01C4 | Ǆ | 452 | Latin Capital Letter DZ with caron | · | |
| Croatian | U+01C5 | ǅ | 453 | Latin Capital Letter D with Small Letter Z with caron | · | |
| Croatian | U+01C6 | ǆ | 454 | Latin Small Letter DZ with caron | · | |
| Croatian | U+01C7 | Ǉ | 455 | Latin Capital Letter LJ | · | |
| Croatian | U+01C8 | ǈ | 456 | Latin Capital Letter L with Small Letter J | · | |
| Croatian | U+01C9 | ǉ | 457 | Latin Small Letter LJ | · | |
| Croatian | U+01CA | Ǌ | 458 | Latin Capital Letter NJ | · | |
| Croatian | U+01CB | ǋ | 459 | Latin Capital Letter N with Small Letter J | · | |
| Croatian | U+01CC | ǌ | 460 | Latin Small Letter NJ | · | |
| Pinyin | U+01CD | Ǎ | 461 | Latin Capital Letter A with caron | · | |
| Pinyin | U+01CE | ǎ | 462 | Latin Small Letter A with caron | · | |
| Pinyin | U+01CF | Ǐ | 463 | Latin Capital Letter I with caron | · | |
| Pinyin | U+01D0 | ǐ | 464 | Latin Small Letter I with caron | · | |
| Pinyin | U+01D1 | Ǒ | 465 | Latin Capital Letter O with caron | · | |
| Pinyin | U+01D2 | ǒ | 466 | Latin Small Letter O with caron | · | |
| Pinyin | U+01D3 | Ǔ | 467 | Latin Capital Letter U with caron | · | |
| Pinyin | U+01D4 | ǔ | 468 | Latin Small Letter U with caron | · | |
| Pinyin | U+01D5 | Ǖ | 469 | Latin Capital Letter U with diaeresis and macron | · | |
| Pinyin | U+01D6 | ǖ | 470 | Latin Small Letter U with diaeresis and macron | · | |
| Pinyin | U+01D7 | Ǘ | 471 | Latin Capital Letter U with diaeresis and acute | · | |
| Pinyin | U+01D8 | ǘ | 472 | Latin Small Letter U with diaeresis and acute | · | |
| Pinyin | U+01D9 | Ǚ | 473 | Latin Capital Letter U with diaeresis and caron | · | |
| Pinyin | U+01DA | ǚ | 474 | Latin Small Letter U with diaeresis and caron | · | |
| Pinyin | U+01DB | Ǜ | 475 | Latin Capital Letter U with diaeresis and grave | · | |
| Pinyin | U+01DC | ǜ | 476 | Latin Small Letter U with diaeresis and grave | · | |
| Phonetic & historic letters | U+01DD | ǝ | 477 | Latin Small Letter Turned E | · | |
| Phonetic & historic letters | U+01DE | Ǟ | 478 | Latin Capital Letter A with diaeresis and macron | 0323 | for Sami |
| Phonetic & historic letters | U+01DF | ǟ | 479 | Latin Small Letter A with diaeresis and macron | 0324 | for Sami |
| Phonetic & historic letters | U+01E0 | Ǡ | 480 | Latin Capital Letter A with dot above and macron | 0325 | for Sami |
| Phonetic & historic letters | U+01E1 | ǡ | 481 | Latin Small Letter A with dot above and macron | 0326 | for Sami |
| Phonetic & historic letters | U+01E2 | Ǣ | 482 | Latin Capital Letter Æ with macron | 0327 | for Sami |
| Phonetic & historic letters | U+01E3 | ǣ | 483 | Latin Small Letter Æ with macron | 0328 | for Sami |
| Phonetic & historic letters | U+01E4 | Ǥ | 484 | Latin Capital Letter G with stroke | 0329 | for Sami |
| Phonetic & historic letters | U+01E5 | ǥ | 485 | Latin Small Letter G with stroke | 0330 | for Sami |
| Phonetic & historic letters | U+01E6 | Ǧ | 486 | Latin Capital Letter G with caron | 0331 | for Sami |
| Phonetic & historic letters | U+01E7 | ǧ | 487 | Latin Small Letter G with caron | 0332 | for Sami |
| Phonetic & historic letters | U+01E8 | Ǩ | 488 | Latin Capital Letter K with caron | 0333 | for Sami |
| Phonetic & historic letters | U+01E9 | ǩ | 489 | Latin Small Letter K with caron | 0334 | for Sami |
| Phonetic & historic letters | U+01EA | Ǫ | 490 | Latin Capital Letter O with ogonek | 0335 | for Sami |
| Phonetic & historic letters | U+01EB | ǫ | 491 | Latin Small Letter O with ogonek | 0336 | for Sami |
| Phonetic & historic letters | U+01EC | Ǭ | 492 | Latin Capital Letter O with ogonek and macron | 0337 | for Sami |
| Phonetic & historic letters | U+01ED | ǭ | 493 | Latin Small Letter O with ogonek and macron | 0338 | for Sami |
| Phonetic & historic letters | U+01EE | Ǯ | 494 | Latin Capital Letter Ezh with caron | 0339 | for Sami |
| Phonetic & historic letters | U+01EF | ǯ | 495 | Latin Small Letter Ezh with caron | 0340 | for Sami |
| Phonetic & historic letters | U+01F0 | ǰ | 496 | Latin Small Letter J with caron | · | |
| Phonetic & historic letters | U+01F1 | Ǳ | 497 | Latin Capital Letter DZ | · | |
| Phonetic & historic letters | U+01F2 | ǲ | 498 | Latin Capital Letter D with Small Letter Z | · | |
| Phonetic & historic letters | U+01F3 | ǳ | 499 | Latin Small Letter DZ | · | |
| Phonetic & historic letters | U+01F4 | Ǵ | 500 | Latin Capital Letter G with acute | · | |
| Phonetic & historic letters | U+01F5 | ǵ | 501 | Latin Small Letter G with acute | · | |
| Phonetic & historic letters | U+01F6 | Ƕ | 502 | Latin Capital Letter Hwair | · | |
| Phonetic & historic letters | U+01F7 | Ƿ | 503 | Latin Capital Letter Wynn | · | |
| Phonetic & historic letters | U+01F8 | Ǹ | 504 | Latin Capital Letter N with grave | · | |
| Phonetic & historic letters | U+01F9 | ǹ | 505 | Latin Small Letter N with grave | · | |
| Phonetic & historic letters | U+01FA | Ǻ | 506 | Latin Capital Letter A with ring above and acute | 0341 | in WGL4 |
| Phonetic & historic letters | U+01FB | ǻ | 507 | Latin Small Letter A with ring above and acute | 0342 | in WGL4 |
| Phonetic & historic letters | U+01FC | Ǽ | 508 | Latin Capital Letter Æ with acute | 0343 | in WGL4 |
| Phonetic & historic letters | U+01FD | ǽ | 509 | Latin Small Letter Æ with acute | 0344 | in WGL4 |
| Phonetic & historic letters | U+01FE | Ǿ | 510 | Latin Capital Letter O with stroke and acute | 0345 | in WGL4 |
| Phonetic & historic letters | U+01FF | ǿ | 511 | Latin Small Letter O with stroke and acute | 0346 | in WGL4 |
| Slovenian & Croatian | U+0200 | Ȁ | 512 | Latin Capital Letter A with double grave | · | |
| Slovenian & Croatian | U+0201 | ȁ | 513 | Latin Small Letter A with double grave | · | |
| Slovenian & Croatian | U+0202 | Ȃ | 514 | Latin Capital Letter A with inverted breve | · | |
| Slovenian & Croatian | U+0203 | ȃ | 515 | Latin Small Letter A with inverted breve | · | |
| Slovenian & Croatian | U+0204 | Ȅ | 516 | Latin Capital Letter E with double grave | · | |
| Slovenian & Croatian | U+0205 | ȅ | 517 | Latin Small Letter E with double grave | · | |
| Slovenian & Croatian | U+0206 | Ȇ | 518 | Latin Capital Letter E with inverted breve | · | |
| Slovenian & Croatian | U+0207 | ȇ | 519 | Latin Small Letter E with inverted breve | · | |
| Slovenian & Croatian | U+0208 | Ȉ | 520 | Latin Capital Letter I with double grave | · | |
| Slovenian & Croatian | U+0209 | ȉ | 521 | Latin Small Letter I with double grave | · | |
| Slovenian & Croatian | U+020A | Ȋ | 522 | Latin Capital Letter I with inverted breve | · | |
| Slovenian & Croatian | U+020B | ȋ | 523 | Latin Small Letter I with inverted breve | · | |
| Slovenian & Croatian | U+020C | Ȍ | 524 | Latin Capital Letter O with double grave | · | |
| Slovenian & Croatian | U+020D | ȍ | 525 | Latin Small Letter O with double grave | · | |
| Slovenian & Croatian | U+020E | Ȏ | 526 | Latin Capital Letter O with inverted breve | · | |
| Slovenian & Croatian | U+020F | ȏ | 527 | Latin Small Letter O with inverted breve | · | |
| Slovenian & Croatian | U+0210 | Ȑ | 528 | Latin Capital Letter R with double grave | · | |
| Slovenian & Croatian | U+0211 | ȑ | 529 | Latin Small Letter R with double grave | · | |
| Slovenian & Croatian | U+0212 | Ȓ | 530 | Latin Capital Letter R with inverted breve | · | |
| Slovenian & Croatian | U+0213 | ȓ | 531 | Latin Small Letter R with inverted breve | · | |
| Slovenian & Croatian | U+0214 | Ȕ | 532 | Latin Capital Letter U with double grave | · | |
| Slovenian & Croatian | U+0215 | ȕ | 533 | Latin Small Letter U with double grave | · | |
| Slovenian & Croatian | U+0216 | Ȗ | 534 | Latin Capital Letter U with inverted breve | · | |
| Slovenian & Croatian | U+0217 | ȗ | 535 | Latin Small Letter U with inverted breve | · | |
| Romanian | U+0218 | Ș | 536 | Latin Capital Letter S with comma below | 0347 | for Romanian |
| Romanian | U+0219 | ș | 537 | Latin Small Letter S with comma below | 0348 | for Romanian |
| Romanian | U+021A | Ț | 538 | Latin Capital Letter T with comma below | 0349 | for Romanian |
| Romanian | U+021B | ț | 539 | Latin Small Letter T with comma below | 0350 | for Romanian |
| Miscellaneous | U+021C | Ȝ | 540 | Latin Capital Letter Yogh | · | |
| Miscellaneous | U+021D | ȝ | 541 | Latin Small Letter Yogh | · | |
| Miscellaneous | U+021E | Ȟ | 542 | Latin Capital Letter H with caron | 0351 | for Finnish Romani, Scots |
| Miscellaneous | U+021F | ȟ | 543 | Latin Small Letter H with caron | 0352 | for Finnish Romani, Scots |
| Miscellaneous | U+0220 | Ƞ | 544 | Latin Capital Letter N with long right leg | · | |
| Miscellaneous | U+0221 | ȡ | 545 | Latin Small Letter D with curl | · | |
| Miscellaneous | U+0222 | Ȣ | 546 | Latin Capital Letter OU | · | |
| Miscellaneous | U+0223 | ȣ | 547 | Latin Small Letter OU | · | |
| Miscellaneous | U+0224 | Ȥ | 548 | Latin Capital Letter Z with hook | · | |
| Miscellaneous | U+0225 | ȥ | 549 | Latin Small Letter Z with hook | · | |
| Miscellaneous | U+0226 | Ȧ | 550 | Latin Capital Letter A with dot above | · | |
| Miscellaneous | U+0227 | ȧ | 551 | Latin Small Letter A with dot above | · | |
| Miscellaneous | U+0228 | Ȩ | 552 | Latin Capital Letter E with cedilla | · | |
| Miscellaneous | U+0229 | ȩ | 553 | Latin Small Letter E with cedilla | · | |
| Livonian | U+022A | Ȫ | 554 | Latin Capital Letter O with diaeresis and macron | · | |
| Livonian | U+022B | ȫ | 555 | Latin Small Letter O with diaeresis and macron | · | |
| Livonian | U+022C | Ȭ | 556 | Latin Capital Letter O with tilde and macron | · | |
| Livonian | U+022D | ȭ | 557 | Latin Small Letter O with tilde and macron | · | |
| Livonian | U+022E | Ȯ | 558 | Latin Capital Letter O with dot above | · | |
| Livonian | U+022F | ȯ | 559 | Latin Small Letter O with dot above | · | |
| Livonian | U+0230 | Ȱ | 560 | Latin Capital Letter O with dot above and macron | · | |
| Livonian | U+0231 | ȱ | 561 | Latin Small Letter O with dot above and macron | · | |
| Livonian | U+0232 | Ȳ | 562 | Latin Capital Letter Y with macron | · | |
| Livonian | U+0233 | ȳ | 563 | Latin Small Letter Y with macron | · | |
| Sinology | U+0234 | ȴ | 564 | Latin Small Letter L with curl | · | |
| Sinology | U+0235 | ȵ | 565 | Latin Small Letter N with curl | · | |
| Sinology | U+0236 | ȶ | 566 | Latin Small Letter T with curl | · | |
| Miscellaneous | U+0237 | ȷ | 567 | Latin Small Letter Dotless J | · | |
| Miscellaneous | U+0238 | ȸ | 568 | Latin Small Letter DB Digraph | · | |
| Miscellaneous | U+0239 | ȹ | 569 | Latin Small Letter QP Digraph | · | |
| Miscellaneous | U+023A | Ⱥ | 570 | Latin Capital Letter A with stroke | · | |
| Miscellaneous | U+023B | Ȼ | 571 | Latin Capital Letter C with stroke | · | |
| Miscellaneous | U+023C | ȼ | 572 | Latin Small Letter C with stroke | · | |
| Miscellaneous | U+023D | Ƚ | 573 | Latin Capital Letter L with bar | · | |
| Miscellaneous | U+023E | Ⱦ | 574 | Latin Capital Letter T with diagonal stroke | · | |
| Miscellaneous | U+023F | ȿ | 575 | Latin Small Letter S with swash tail | · | |
| Miscellaneous | U+0240 | ɀ | 576 | Latin Small Letter Z with swash tail | · | |
| Miscellaneous | U+0241 | Ɂ | 577 | Latin Capital Letter Glottal Stop | · | |
| Miscellaneous | U+0242 | ɂ | 578 | Latin Small Letter Glottal Stop | · | |
| Miscellaneous | U+0243 | Ƀ | 579 | Latin Capital Letter B with stroke | · | |
| Miscellaneous | U+0244 | Ʉ | 580 | Latin Capital Letter U bar | · | |
| Miscellaneous | U+0245 | Ʌ | 581 | Latin Capital Letter Turned V | · | |
| Miscellaneous | U+0246 | Ɇ | 582 | Latin Capital Letter E with stroke | · | |
| Miscellaneous | U+0247 | ɇ | 583 | Latin Small Letter E with stroke | · | |
| Miscellaneous | U+0248 | Ɉ | 584 | Latin Capital Letter J with stroke | · | |
| Miscellaneous | U+0249 | ɉ | 585 | Latin Small Letter J with stroke | · | |
| Miscellaneous | U+024A | Ɋ | 586 | Latin Capital Letter Q with hook tail | · | |
| Miscellaneous | U+024B | ɋ | 587 | Latin Small Letter Q with hook tail | · | |
| Miscellaneous | U+024C | Ɍ | 588 | Latin Capital Letter R with stroke | · | |
| Miscellaneous | U+024D | ɍ | 589 | Latin Small Letter R with stroke | · | |
| Miscellaneous | U+024E | Ɏ | 590 | Latin Capital Letter Y with stroke | · | |
| Miscellaneous | U+024F | ɏ | 591 | Latin Small Letter Y with stroke | · | |
| | Code | Glyph | Decimal | Description | # | MES-2 Rationale |

==== Latin Extended Additional ====
256 characters; all belong to the Latin script; 23 in the MES-2 subset.

| | Code | Glyph | Description | # | MES-2 Rationale |
|---|---|---|---|---|---|
| General Use; Extensions | U+1E00 | Ḁ | Latin Capital Letter A with ring below | · | |
| General Use; Extensions | U+1E01 | ḁ | Latin Small Letter A with ring below | · | |
| General Use; Extensions | U+1E02 | Ḃ | Latin Capital Letter B with dot above | 0647 | ISO 8859-14 |
| General Use; Extensions | U+1E03 | ḃ | Latin Small Letter B with dot above | 0648 | ISO 8859-14 |
| General Use; Extensions | U+1E04 | Ḅ | Latin Capital Letter B with dot below | | |
| General Use; Extensions | U+1E05 | ḅ | Latin Small Letter B with dot below | | |
| General Use; Extensions | U+1E06 | Ḇ | Latin Capital Letter B with line below | | |
| General Use; Extensions | U+1E07 | ḇ | Latin Small Letter B with line below | | |
| General Use; Extensions | U+1E08 | Ḉ | Latin Capital Letter C with cedilla and acute | | |
| General Use; Extensions | U+1E09 | ḉ | Latin Small Letter C with cedilla and acute | | |
| General Use; Extensions | U+1E0A | Ḋ | Latin Capital Letter D with dot above | 0649 | ISO 8859-14 |
| General Use; Extensions | U+1E0B | ḋ | Latin Small Letter D with dot above | 0650 | ISO 8859-14 |
| General Use; Extensions | U+1E0C | Ḍ | Latin Capital Letter D with dot below | | |
| General Use; Extensions | U+1E0D | ḍ | Latin Small Letter D with dot below | | |
| General Use; Extensions | U+1E0E | Ḏ | Latin Capital Letter D with line below | | |
| General Use; Extensions | U+1E0F | ḏ | Latin Small Letter D with line below | | |
| General Use; Extensions | U+1E10 | Ḑ | Latin Capital Letter D with cedilla | | |
| General Use; Extensions | U+1E11 | ḑ | Latin Small Letter D with cedilla | | |
| General Use; Extensions | U+1E12 | Ḓ | Latin Capital Letter D with circumflex below | | |
| General Use; Extensions | U+1E13 | ḓ | Latin Small Letter D with circumflex below | | |
| General Use; Extensions | U+1E14 | Ḕ | Latin Capital Letter E with macron and grave | | |
| General Use; Extensions | U+1E15 | ḕ | Latin Small Letter E with macron and grave | | |
| General Use; Extensions | U+1E16 | Ḗ | Latin Capital Letter E with macron and acute | | |
| General Use; Extensions | U+1E17 | ḗ | Latin Small Letter E with macron and acute | | |
| General Use; Extensions | U+1E18 | Ḙ | Latin Capital Letter E with circumflex below | | |
| General Use; Extensions | U+1E19 | ḙ | Latin Small Letter E with circumflex below | | |
| General Use; Extensions | U+1E1A | Ḛ | Latin Capital Letter E with tilde below | | |
| General Use; Extensions | U+1E1B | ḛ | Latin Small Letter E with tilde below | | |
| General Use; Extensions | U+1E1C | Ḝ | Latin Capital Letter E with cedilla and breve | | |
| General Use; Extensions | U+1E1D | ḝ | Latin Small Letter E with cedilla and breve | | |
| General Use; Extensions | U+1E1E | Ḟ | Latin Capital Letter F with dot above | 0651 | ISO 8859-14 |
| General Use; Extensions | U+1E1F | ḟ | Latin Small Letter F with dot above | 0652 | ISO 8859-14 |
| General Use; Extensions | U+1E20 | Ḡ | Latin Capital Letter G with macron | | |
| General Use; Extensions | U+1E21 | ḡ | Latin Small Letter G with macron | | |
| General Use; Extensions | U+1E22 | Ḣ | Latin Capital Letter H with dot above | | |
| General Use; Extensions | U+1E23 | ḣ | Latin Small Letter H with dot above | | |
| General Use; Extensions | U+1E24 | Ḥ | Latin Capital Letter H with dot below | | |
| General Use; Extensions | U+1E25 | ḥ | Latin Small Letter H with dot below | | |
| General Use; Extensions | U+1E26 | Ḧ | Latin Capital Letter H with diaeresis | | |
| General Use; Extensions | U+1E27 | ḧ | Latin Small Letter H with diaeresis | | |
| General Use; Extensions | U+1E28 | Ḩ | Latin Capital Letter H with cedilla | | |
| General Use; Extensions | U+1E29 | ḩ | Latin Small Letter H with cedilla | | |
| General Use; Extensions | U+1E2A | Ḫ | Latin Capital Letter H with breve below | | |
| General Use; Extensions | U+1E2B | ḫ | Latin Small Letter H with breve below | | |
| General Use; Extensions | U+1E2C | Ḭ | Latin Capital Letter I with tilde below | | |
| General Use; Extensions | U+1E2D | ḭ | Latin Small Letter I with tilde below | | |
| General Use; Extensions | U+1E2E | Ḯ | Latin Capital Letter I with diaeresis and acute | | |
| General Use; Extensions | U+1E2F | ḯ | Latin Small Letter I with diaeresis and acute | | |
| General Use; Extensions | U+1E30 | Ḱ | Latin Capital Letter K with acute | | |
| General Use; Extensions | U+1E31 | ḱ | Latin Small Letter K with acute | | |
| General Use; Extensions | U+1E32 | Ḳ | Latin Capital Letter K with dot below | | |
| General Use; Extensions | U+1E33 | ḳ | Latin Small Letter K with dot below | | |
| General Use; Extensions | U+1E34 | Ḵ | Latin Capital Letter K with line below | | |
| General Use; Extensions | U+1E35 | ḵ | Latin Small Letter K with line below | | |
| General Use; Extensions | U+1E36 | Ḷ | Latin Capital Letter L with dot below | | |
| General Use; Extensions | U+1E37 | ḷ | Latin Small Letter L with dot below | | |
| General Use; Extensions | U+1E38 | Ḹ | Latin Capital Letter L with dot below and macron | | |
| General Use; Extensions | U+1E39 | ḹ | Latin Small Letter L with dot below and macron | | |
| General Use; Extensions | U+1E3A | Ḻ | Latin Capital Letter L with line below | | |
| General Use; Extensions | U+1E3B | ḻ | Latin Small Letter L with line below | | |
| General Use; Extensions | U+1E3C | Ḽ | Latin Capital Letter L with circumflex below | | |
| General Use; Extensions | U+1E3D | ḽ | Latin Small Letter L with circumflex below | | |
| General Use; Extensions | U+1E3E | Ḿ | Latin Capital Letter M with acute | | |
| General Use; Extensions | U+1E3F | ḿ | Latin Small Letter M with acute | | |
| General Use; Extensions | U+1E40 | Ṁ | Latin Capital Letter M with dot above | 0653 | ISO 8859-14 |
| General Use; Extensions | U+1E41 | ṁ | Latin Small Letter M with dot above | 0654 | ISO 8859-14 |
| General Use; Extensions | U+1E42 | Ṃ | Latin Capital Letter M with dot below | | |
| General Use; Extensions | U+1E43 | ṃ | Latin Small Letter M with dot below | | |
| General Use; Extensions | U+1E44 | Ṅ | Latin Capital Letter N with dot above | | |
| General Use; Extensions | U+1E45 | ṅ | Latin Small Letter N with dot above | | |
| General Use; Extensions | U+1E46 | Ṇ | Latin Capital Letter N with dot below | | |
| General Use; Extensions | U+1E47 | ṇ | Latin Small Letter N with dot below | | |
| General Use; Extensions | U+1E48 | Ṉ | Latin Capital Letter N with line below | | |
| General Use; Extensions | U+1E49 | ṉ | Latin Small Letter N with line below | | |
| General Use; Extensions | U+1E4A | Ṋ | Latin Capital Letter N with circumflex below | | |
| General Use; Extensions | U+1E4B | ṋ | Latin Small Letter N with circumflex below | | |
| General Use; Extensions | U+1E4C | Ṍ | Latin Capital Letter O with tilde and acute | | |
| General Use; Extensions | U+1E4D | ṍ | Latin Small Letter O with tilde and acute | | |
| General Use; Extensions | U+1E4E | Ṏ | Latin Capital Letter O with tilde and diaeresis | | |
| General Use; Extensions | U+1E4F | ṏ | Latin Small Letter O with tilde and diaeresis | | |
| General Use; Extensions | U+1E50 | Ṑ | Latin Capital Letter O with macron and grave | | |
| General Use; Extensions | U+1E51 | ṑ | Latin Small Letter O with macron and grave | | |
| General Use; Extensions | U+1E52 | Ṓ | Latin Capital Letter O with macron and acute | | |
| General Use; Extensions | U+1E53 | ṓ | Latin Small Letter O with macron and acute | | |
| General Use; Extensions | U+1E54 | Ṕ | Latin Capital Letter P with acute | | |
| General Use; Extensions | U+1E55 | ṕ | Latin Small Letter P with acute | | |
| General Use; Extensions | U+1E56 | Ṗ | Latin Capital Letter P with dot above | 0655 | ISO 8859-14 |
| General Use; Extensions | U+1E57 | ṗ | Latin Small Letter P with dot above | 0656 | ISO 8859-14 |
| General Use; Extensions | U+1E58 | Ṙ | Latin Capital Letter R with dot above | | |
| General Use; Extensions | U+1E59 | ṙ | Latin Small Letter R with dot above | | |
| General Use; Extensions | U+1E5A | Ṛ | Latin Capital Letter R with dot below | | |
| General Use; Extensions | U+1E5B | ṛ | Latin Small Letter R with dot below | | |
| General Use; Extensions | U+1E5C | Ṝ | Latin Capital Letter R with dot below and macron | | |
| General Use; Extensions | U+1E5D | ṝ | Latin Small Letter R with dot below and macron | | |
| General Use; Extensions | U+1E5E | Ṟ | Latin Capital Letter R with line below | | |
| General Use; Extensions | U+1E5F | ṟ | Latin Small Letter R with line below | | |
| General Use; Extensions | U+1E60 | Ṡ | Latin Capital Letter S with dot above | 0657 | ISO 8859-14 |
| General Use; Extensions | U+1E61 | ṡ | Latin Small Letter S with dot above | 0658 | ISO 8859-14 |
| General Use; Extensions | U+1E62 | Ṣ | Latin Capital Letter S with dot below | | |
| General Use; Extensions | U+1E63 | ṣ | Latin Small Letter S with dot below | | |
| General Use; Extensions | U+1E64 | Ṥ | Latin Capital Letter S with acute and dot above | | |
| General Use; Extensions | U+1E65 | ṥ | Latin Small Letter S with acute and dot above | | |
| General Use; Extensions | U+1E66 | Ṧ | Latin Capital Letter S with caron and dot above | | |
| General Use; Extensions | U+1E67 | ṧ | Latin Small Letter S with caron and dot above | | |
| General Use; Extensions | U+1E68 | Ṩ | Latin Capital Letter S with dot below and dot above | | |
| General Use; Extensions | U+1E69 | ṩ | Latin Small Letter S with dot below and dot above | | |
| General Use; Extensions | U+1E6A | Ṫ | Latin Capital Letter T with dot above | 0659 | ISO 8859-14 |
| General Use; Extensions | U+1E6B | ṫ | Latin Small Letter T with dot above | 0660 | ISO 8859-14 |
| General Use; Extensions | U+1E6C | Ṭ | Latin Capital Letter T with dot below | | |
| General Use; Extensions | U+1E6D | ṭ | Latin Small Letter T with dot below | | |
| General Use; Extensions | U+1E6E | Ṯ | Latin Capital Letter T with line below | | |
| General Use; Extensions | U+1E6F | ṯ | Latin Small Letter T with line below | | |
| General Use; Extensions | U+1E70 | Ṱ | Latin Capital Letter T with circumflex below | | |
| General Use; Extensions | U+1E71 | ṱ | Latin Small Letter T with circumflex below | | |
| General Use; Extensions | U+1E72 | Ṳ | Latin Capital Letter U with diaeresis below | | |
| General Use; Extensions | U+1E73 | ṳ | Latin Small Letter U with diaeresis below | | |
| General Use; Extensions | U+1E74 | Ṵ | Latin Capital Letter U with tilde below | | |
| General Use; Extensions | U+1E75 | ṵ | Latin Small Letter U with tilde below | | |
| General Use; Extensions | U+1E76 | Ṷ | Latin Capital Letter U with circumflex below | | |
| General Use; Extensions | U+1E77 | ṷ | Latin Small Letter U with circumflex below | | |
| General Use; Extensions | U+1E78 | Ṹ | Latin Capital Letter U with tilde and acute | | |
| General Use; Extensions | U+1E79 | ṹ | Latin Small Letter U with tilde and acute | | |
| General Use; Extensions | U+1E7A | Ṻ | Latin Capital Letter U with macron and diaeresis | | |
| General Use; Extensions | U+1E7B | ṻ | Latin Small Letter U with macron and diaeresis | | |
| General Use; Extensions | U+1E7C | Ṽ | Latin Capital Letter V with tilde | | |
| General Use; Extensions | U+1E7D | ṽ | Latin Small Letter V with tilde | | |
| General Use; Extensions | U+1E7E | Ṿ | Latin Capital Letter V with dot below | | |
| General Use; Extensions | U+1E7F | ṿ | Latin Small Letter V with dot below | | |
| General Use; Extensions | U+1E80 | Ẁ | Latin Capital Letter W with grave | 0661 | in WGL4 |
| General Use; Extensions | U+1E81 | ẁ | Latin Small Letter W with grave | 0662 | in WGL4 |
| General Use; Extensions | U+1E82 | Ẃ | Latin Capital Letter W with acute | 0663 | in WGL4 |
| General Use; Extensions | U+1E83 | ẃ | Latin Small Letter W with acute | 0664 | in WGL4 |
| General Use; Extensions | U+1E84 | Ẅ | Latin Capital Letter W with diaeresis | 0665 | in WGL4 |
| General Use; Extensions | U+1E85 | ẅ | Latin Small Letter W with diaeresis | 0666 | in WGL4 |
| General Use; Extensions | U+1E86 | Ẇ | Latin Capital Letter W with dot above | | |
| General Use; Extensions | U+1E87 | ẇ | Latin Small Letter W with dot above | | |
| General Use; Extensions | U+1E88 | Ẉ | Latin Capital Letter W with dot below | | |
| General Use; Extensions | U+1E89 | ẉ | Latin Small Letter W with dot below | | |
| General Use; Extensions | U+1E8A | Ẋ | Latin Capital Letter X with dot above | | |
| General Use; Extensions | U+1E8B | ẋ | Latin Small Letter X with dot above | | |
| General Use; Extensions | U+1E8C | Ẍ | Latin Capital Letter X with diaeresis | | |
| General Use; Extensions | U+1E8D | ẍ | Latin Small Letter X with diaeresis | | |
| General Use; Extensions | U+1E8E | Ẏ | Latin Capital Letter Y with dot above | | |
| General Use; Extensions | U+1E8F | ẏ | Latin Small Letter Y with dot above | | |
| General Use; Extensions | U+1E90 | Ẑ | Latin Capital Letter Z with circumflex | | |
| General Use; Extensions | U+1E91 | ẑ | Latin Small Letter Z with circumflex | | |
| General Use; Extensions | U+1E92 | Ẓ | Latin Capital Letter Z with dot below | | |
| General Use; Extensions | U+1E93 | ẓ | Latin Small Letter Z with dot below | | |
| General Use; Extensions | U+1E94 | Ẕ | Latin Capital Letter Z with line below | | |
| General Use; Extensions | U+1E95 | ẕ | Latin Small Letter Z with line below | | |
| General Use; Extensions | U+1E96 | ẖ | Latin Small Letter H with line below | | |
| General Use; Extensions | U+1E97 | ẗ | Latin Small Letter T with diaeresis | | |
| General Use; Extensions | U+1E98 | ẘ | Latin Small Letter W with ring above | | |
| General Use; Extensions | U+1E99 | ẙ | Latin Small Letter Y with ring above | | |
| General Use; Extensions | U+1E9A | ẚ | Latin Small Letter A with right half ring | | |
| General Use; Extensions | U+1E9B | ẛ | Latin Small Letter Long S with dot above | 0667 | for Fraktur, Irish Gaelic, Old English |
| Medievalist | U+1E9C | ẜ | Latin Small Letter Long S with diagonal stroke | | |
| Medievalist | U+1E9D | ẝ | Latin Small Letter Long S with high stroke | | |
| German typography | U+1E9E | ẞ | Latin Capital Letter Sharp S | | |
| Medievalist | U+1E9F | ẟ | Latin Small Letter Delta | | |
| Vietnamese | U+1EA0 | Ạ | Latin Capital Letter A with dot below | | |
| Vietnamese | U+1EA1 | ạ | Latin Small Letter A with dot below | | |
| Vietnamese | U+1EA2 | Ả | Latin Capital Letter A with hook above | | |
| Vietnamese | U+1EA3 | ả | Latin Small Letter A with hook above | | |
| Vietnamese | U+1EA4 | Ấ | Latin Capital Letter A with circumflex and acute | | |
| Vietnamese | U+1EA5 | ấ | Latin Small Letter A with circumflex and acute | | |
| Vietnamese | U+1EA6 | Ầ | Latin Capital Letter A with circumflex and grave | | |
| Vietnamese | U+1EA7 | ầ | Latin Small Letter A with circumflex and grave | | |
| Vietnamese | U+1EA8 | Ẩ | Latin Capital Letter A with circumflex and hook above | | |
| Vietnamese | U+1EA9 | ẩ | Latin Small Letter A with circumflex and hook above | | |
| Vietnamese | U+1EAA | Ẫ | Latin Capital Letter A with circumflex and tilde | | |
| Vietnamese | U+1EAB | ẫ | Latin Small Letter A with circumflex and tilde | | |
| Vietnamese | U+1EAC | Ậ | Latin Capital Letter A with circumflex and dot below | | |
| Vietnamese | U+1EAD | ậ | Latin Small Letter A with circumflex and dot below | | |
| Vietnamese | U+1EAE | Ắ | Latin Capital Letter A with breve and acute | | |
| Vietnamese | U+1EAF | ắ | Latin Small Letter A with breve and acute | | |
| Vietnamese | U+1EB0 | Ằ | Latin Capital Letter A with breve and grave | | |
| Vietnamese | U+1EB1 | ằ | Latin Small Letter A with breve and grave | | |
| Vietnamese | U+1EB2 | Ẳ | Latin Capital Letter A with breve and hook above | | |
| Vietnamese | U+1EB3 | ẳ | Latin Small Letter A with breve and hook above | | |
| Vietnamese | U+1EB4 | Ẵ | Latin Capital Letter A with breve and tilde | | |
| Vietnamese | U+1EB5 | ẵ | Latin Small Letter A with breve and tilde | | |
| Vietnamese | U+1EB6 | Ặ | Latin Capital Letter A with breve and dot below | | |
| Vietnamese | U+1EB7 | ặ | Latin Small Letter A with breve and dot below | | |
| Vietnamese | U+1EB8 | Ẹ | Latin Capital Letter E with dot below | | |
| Vietnamese | U+1EB9 | ẹ | Latin Small Letter E with dot below | | |
| Vietnamese | U+1EBA | Ẻ | Latin Capital Letter E with hook above | | |
| Vietnamese | U+1EBB | ẻ | Latin Small Letter E with hook above | | |
| Vietnamese | U+1EBC | Ẽ | Latin Capital Letter E with tilde | | |
| Vietnamese | U+1EBD | ẽ | Latin Small Letter E with tilde | | |
| Vietnamese | U+1EBE | Ế | Latin Capital Letter E with circumflex and acute | | |
| Vietnamese | U+1EBF | ế | Latin Small Letter E with circumflex and acute | | |
| Vietnamese | U+1EC0 | Ề | Latin Capital Letter E with circumflex and grave | | |
| Vietnamese | U+1EC1 | ề | Latin Small Letter E with circumflex and grave | | |
| Vietnamese | U+1EC2 | Ể | Latin Capital Letter E with circumflex and hook above | | |
| Vietnamese | U+1EC3 | ể | Latin Small Letter E with circumflex and hook above | | |
| Vietnamese | U+1EC4 | Ễ | Latin Capital Letter E with circumflex and tilde | | |
| Vietnamese | U+1EC5 | ễ | Latin Small Letter E with circumflex and tilde | | |
| Vietnamese | U+1EC6 | Ệ | Latin Capital Letter E with circumflex and dot below | | |
| Vietnamese | U+1EC7 | ệ | Latin Small Letter E with circumflex and dot below | | |
| Vietnamese | U+1EC8 | Ỉ | Latin Capital Letter I with hook above | | |
| Vietnamese | U+1EC9 | ỉ | Latin Small Letter I with hook above | | |
| Vietnamese | U+1ECA | Ị | Latin Capital Letter I with dot below | | |
| Vietnamese | U+1ECB | ị | Latin Small Letter I with dot below | | |
| Vietnamese | U+1ECC | Ọ | Latin Capital Letter O with dot below | | |
| Vietnamese | U+1ECD | ọ | Latin Small Letter O with dot below | | |
| Vietnamese | U+1ECE | Ỏ | Latin Capital Letter O with hook above | | |
| Vietnamese | U+1ECF | ỏ | Latin Small Letter O with hook above | | |
| Vietnamese | U+1ED0 | Ố | Latin Capital Letter O with circumflex and acute | | |
| Vietnamese | U+1ED1 | ố | Latin Small Letter O with circumflex and acute | | |
| Vietnamese | U+1ED2 | Ồ | Latin Capital Letter O with circumflex and grave | | |
| Vietnamese | U+1ED3 | ồ | Latin Small Letter O with circumflex and grave | | |
| Vietnamese | U+1ED4 | Ổ | Latin Capital Letter O with circumflex and hook above | | |
| Vietnamese | U+1ED5 | ổ | Latin Small Letter O with circumflex and hook above | | |
| Vietnamese | U+1ED6 | Ỗ | Latin Capital Letter O with circumflex and tilde | | |
| Vietnamese | U+1ED7 | ỗ | Latin Small Letter O with circumflex and tilde | | |
| Vietnamese | U+1ED8 | Ộ | Latin Capital Letter O with circumflex and dot below | | |
| Vietnamese | U+1ED9 | ộ | Latin Small Letter O with circumflex and dot below | | |
| Vietnamese | U+1EDA | Ớ | Latin Capital Letter O with horn and acute | | |
| Vietnamese | U+1EDB | ớ | Latin Small Letter O with horn and acute | | |
| Vietnamese | U+1EDC | Ờ | Latin Capital Letter O with horn and grave | | |
| Vietnamese | U+1EDD | ờ | Latin Small Letter O with horn and grave | | |
| Vietnamese | U+1EDE | Ở | Latin Capital Letter O with horn and hook above | | |
| Vietnamese | U+1EDF | ở | Latin Small Letter O with horn and hook above | | |
| Vietnamese | U+1EE0 | Ỡ | Latin Capital Letter O with horn and tilde | | |
| Vietnamese | U+1EE1 | ỡ | Latin Small Letter O with horn and tilde | | |
| Vietnamese | U+1EE2 | Ợ | Latin Capital Letter O with horn and dot below | | |
| Vietnamese | U+1EE3 | ợ | Latin Small Letter O with horn and dot below | | |
| Vietnamese | U+1EE4 | Ụ | Latin Capital Letter U with dot below | | |
| Vietnamese | U+1EE5 | ụ | Latin Small Letter U with dot below | | |
| Vietnamese | U+1EE6 | Ủ | Latin Capital Letter U with hook above | | |
| Vietnamese | U+1EE7 | ủ | Latin Small Letter U with hook above | | |
| Vietnamese | U+1EE8 | Ứ | Latin Capital Letter U with horn and acute | | |
| Vietnamese | U+1EE9 | ứ | Latin Small Letter U with horn and acute | | |
| Vietnamese | U+1EEA | Ừ | Latin Capital Letter U with horn and grave | | |
| Vietnamese | U+1EEB | ừ | Latin Small Letter U with horn and grave | | |
| Vietnamese | U+1EEC | Ử | Latin Capital Letter U with horn and hook above | | |
| Vietnamese | U+1EED | ử | Latin Small Letter U with horn and hook above | | |
| Vietnamese | U+1EEE | Ữ | Latin Capital Letter U with horn and tilde | | |
| Vietnamese | U+1EEF | ữ | Latin Small Letter U with horn and tilde | | |
| Vietnamese | U+1EF0 | Ự | Latin Capital Letter U with horn and dot below | | |
| Vietnamese | U+1EF1 | ự | Latin Small Letter U with horn and dot below | | |
| Vietnamese | U+1EF2 | Ỳ | Latin Capital Letter Y with grave | 0668 | in WGL4 |
| Vietnamese | U+1EF3 | ỳ | Latin Small Letter Y with grave | 0669 | in WGL4 |
| Vietnamese | U+1EF4 | Ỵ | Latin Capital Letter Y with dot below | | |
| Vietnamese | U+1EF5 | ỵ | Latin Small Letter Y with dot below | | |
| Vietnamese | U+1EF6 | Ỷ | Latin Capital Letter Y with hook above | | |
| Vietnamese | U+1EF7 | ỷ | Latin Small Letter Y with hook above | | |
| Vietnamese | U+1EF8 | Ỹ | Latin Capital Letter Y with tilde | | |
| Vietnamese | U+1EF9 | ỹ | Latin Small Letter Y with tilde | | |
| Medievalist | U+1EFA | Ỻ | Latin Capital Letter Middle-Welsh LL | | |
| Medievalist | U+1EFB | ỻ | Latin Small Letter Middle-Welsh LL | | |
| Medievalist | U+1EFC | Ỽ | Latin Capital Letter Middle-Welsh V | | |
| Medievalist | U+1EFD | ỽ | Latin Small Letter Middle-Welsh V | | |
| Medievalist | U+1EFE | Ỿ | Latin Capital Letter Y with loop | | |
| Medievalist | U+1EFF | ỿ | Latin Small Letter Y with loop | | |
| | Code | Glyph | Description | # | MES-2 Rationale |

==== Additional Latin Extended ====
- Latin Extended-C
- Latin Extended-D
- Latin Extended-E
- Latin Extended-F
- Latin Extended-G

==== Latin Ligatures ====
| Code | Glyph | Description |
|---|---|---|
| U+FB00 | ﬀ | Latin Small Ligature FF |
| U+FB01 | ﬁ | Latin Small Ligature FI |
| U+FB02 | ﬂ | Latin Small Ligature FL |
| U+FB03 | ﬃ | Latin Small Ligature FFI |
| U+FB04 | ﬄ | Latin Small Ligature FFL |
| U+FB05 | ﬅ | Latin Small Ligature Long S T |
| U+FB06 | ﬆ | Latin Small Ligature ST |

=== Phonetic scripts ===
==== IPA Extensions ====
96 characters; all belong to the Latin script; three in the MES-2 subset.

| Code | Glyph | Decimal | Description | # | MES-2 Rationale |
|---|---|---|---|---|---|
| U+0250 | ɐ | 592 | Latin Small Letter Turned A | | |
| U+0251 | ɑ | 593 | Latin Small Letter Alpha | | |
| U+0252 | ɒ | 594 | Latin Small Letter Turned Alpha | | |
| U+0253 | ɓ | 595 | Latin Small Letter B with Hook | | |
| U+0254 | ɔ | 596 | Latin Small Letter Open O | | |
| U+0255 | ɕ | 597 | Latin Small Letter C with Curl | | |
| U+0256 | ɖ | 598 | Latin Small Letter D with Tail | | |
| U+0257 | ɗ | 599 | Latin Small Letter D with Hook | | |
| U+0258 | ɘ | 600 | Latin Small Letter Reversed E | | |
| U+0259 | ə | 601 | Latin Small Letter Schwa | 0353 | for Azerbaijani |
| U+025A | ɚ | 602 | Latin Small Letter Schwa with Hook | | |
| U+025B | ɛ | 603 | Latin Small Letter Open E | | |
| U+025C | ɜ | 604 | Latin Small Letter Reversed Open E | | |
| U+025D | ɝ | 605 | Latin Small Letter Reversed Open E with Hook | | |
| U+025E | ɞ | 606 | Latin Small Letter Closed Reversed Open E | | |
| U+025F | ɟ | 607 | Latin Small Letter Dotless J with Stroke | | |
| U+0260 | ɠ | 608 | Latin Small Letter G with Hook | | |
| U+0261 | ɡ | 609 | Latin Small Letter Script G | | |
| U+0262 | ɢ | 610 | Latin Letter Small Capital G | | |
| U+0263 | ɣ | 611 | Latin Small Letter Gamma | | |
| U+0264 | ɤ | 612 | Latin Small Letter Rams Horn | | |
| U+0265 | ɥ | 613 | Latin Small Letter Turned H | | |
| U+0266 | ɦ | 614 | Latin Small Letter H with Hook | | |
| U+0267 | ɧ | 615 | Latin Small Letter Heng with Hook | | |
| U+0268 | ɨ | 616 | Latin Small Letter I with Stroke | | |
| U+0269 | ɩ | 617 | Latin Small Letter Iota | | |
| U+026A | ɪ | 618 | Latin Letter Small Capital I | | |
| U+026B | ɫ | 619 | Latin Small Letter L with Middle Tilde | | |
| U+026C | ɬ | 620 | Latin Small Letter L with Belt | | |
| U+026D | ɭ | 621 | Latin Small Letter L with Retroflex Hook | | |
| U+026E | ɮ | 622 | Latin Small Letter Lezh | | |
| U+026F | ɯ | 623 | Latin Small Letter Turned M | | |
| U+0270 | ɰ | 624 | Latin Small Letter Turned M with Long Leg | | |
| U+0271 | ɱ | 625 | Latin Small Letter M with Hook | | |
| U+0272 | ɲ | 626 | Latin Small Letter N with Left Hook | | |
| U+0273 | ɳ | 627 | Latin Small Letter N with Retroflex Hook | | |
| U+0274 | ɴ | 628 | Latin Letter Small Capital N | | |
| U+0275 | ɵ | 629 | Latin Small Letter Barred O | | |
| U+0276 | ɶ | 630 | Latin Letter Small Capital OE | | |
| U+0277 | ɷ | 631 | Latin Small Letter Closed Omega | | |
| U+0278 | ɸ | 632 | Latin Small Letter Phi | | |
| U+0279 | ɹ | 633 | Latin Small Letter Turned R | | |
| U+027A | ɺ | 634 | Latin Small Letter Turned R with Long Leg | | |
| U+027B | ɻ | 635 | Latin Small Letter Turned R with Hook | | |
| U+027C | ɼ | 636 | Latin Small Letter R with long leg | 0354 | for Irish Gaelic |
| U+027D | ɽ | 637 | Latin Small Letter R with Tail | | |
| U+027E | ɾ | 638 | Latin Small Letter R with Fishhook | | |
| U+027F | ɿ | 639 | Latin Small Letter Reversed R with Fishhook | | |
| U+0280 | ʀ | 640 | Latin Letter Small Capital R | | |
| U+0281 | ʁ | 641 | Latin Letter Small Capital Inverted R | | |
| U+0282 | ʂ | 642 | Latin Small Letter S with Hook | | |
| U+0283 | ʃ | 643 | Latin Small Letter Esh | | |
| U+0284 | ʄ | 644 | Latin Small Letter Dotless J with Stroke and Hook | | |
| U+0285 | ʅ | 645 | Latin Small Letter Squat Reversed Esh | | |
| U+0286 | ʆ | 646 | Latin Small Letter Esh with Curl | | |
| U+0287 | ʇ | 647 | Latin Small Letter Turned T | | |
| U+0288 | ʈ | 648 | Latin Small Letter T with Retroflex Hook | | |
| U+0289 | ʉ | 649 | Latin Small Letter U Bar | | |
| U+028A | ʊ | 650 | Latin Small Letter Upsilon | | |
| U+028B | ʋ | 651 | Latin Small Letter V with Hook | | |
| U+028C | ʌ | 652 | Latin Small Letter Turned V | | |
| U+028D | ʍ | 653 | Latin Small Letter Turned W | | |
| U+028E | ʎ | 654 | Latin Small Letter Turned Y | | |
| U+028F | ʏ | 655 | Latin Letter Small Capital Y | | |
| U+0290 | ʐ | 656 | Latin Small Letter Z with Retroflex Hook | | |
| U+0291 | ʑ | 657 | Latin Small Letter Z with Curl | | |
| U+0292 | ʒ | 658 | Latin Small Letter Ezh | 0355 | for Sami |
| U+0293 | ʓ | 659 | Latin Small Letter Ezh with Curl | | |
| U+0294 | ʔ | 660 | Latin Letter Glottal Stop | | |
| U+0295 | ʕ | 661 | Latin Letter Pharyngeal Voiced Fricative | | |
| U+0296 | ʖ | 662 | Latin Letter Inverted Glottal Stop | | |
| U+0297 | ʗ | 663 | Latin Letter Stretched C | | |
| U+0298 | ʘ | 664 | Latin Letter Bilabial Click | | |
| U+0299 | ʙ | 665 | Latin Letter Small Capital B | | |
| U+029A | ʚ | 666 | Latin Small Letter Closed Open E | | |
| U+029B | ʛ | 667 | Latin Letter Small Capital G with Hook | | |
| U+029C | ʜ | 668 | Latin Letter Small Capital H | | |
| U+029D | ʝ | 669 | Latin Small Letter J with Crossed Tail | | |
| U+029E | ʞ | 670 | Latin Small Letter Turned K | | |
| U+029F | ʟ | 671 | Latin Letter Small Capital L | | |
| U+02A0 | ʠ | 672 | Latin Small Letter Q with Hook | | |
| U+02A1 | ʡ | 673 | Latin Letter Glottal Stop with Stroke | | |
| U+02A2 | ʢ | 674 | Latin Letter Reversed Glottal Stop with Stroke | | |
| U+02A3 | ʣ | 675 | Latin Small Letter DZ Digraph | | |
| U+02A4 | ʤ | 676 | Latin Small Letter Dezh Digraph | | |
| U+02A5 | ʥ | 677 | Latin Small Letter DZ Digraph with Curl | | |
| U+02A6 | ʦ | 678 | Latin Small Letter TS Digraph | | |
| U+02A7 | ʧ | 679 | Latin Small Letter Tesh Digraph | | |
| U+02A8 | ʨ | 680 | Latin Small Letter TC Digraph with Curl | | |
| U+02A9 | ʩ | 681 | Latin Small Letter Feng Digraph | | |
| U+02AA | ʪ | 682 | Latin Small Letter LS Digraph | | |
| U+02AB | ʫ | 683 | Latin Small Letter LZ Digraph | | |
| U+02AC | ʬ | 684 | Latin Letter Bilabial Percussive | | |
| U+02AD | ʭ | 685 | Latin Letter Bidental Percussive | | |
| U+02AE | ʮ | 686 | Latin Small Letter Turned H with Fishhook | | |
| U+02AF | ʯ | 687 | Latin Small Letter Turned H with Fishhook and Tail | | |
| Code | Glyph | Decimal | Description | # | MES-2 Rationale |

==== Spacing modifier letters ====
80 characters; 15 in the MES-2 subset.

| Code | Glyph | Decimal | Description | # | MES-2 Rationale |
|---|---|---|---|---|---|
| U+02B0 | ʰ | 688 | Modifier Letter Small H | · | |
| U+02B1 | ʱ | 689 | Modifier Letter Small H with hook | · | |
| U+02B2 | ʲ | 690 | Modifier Letter Small J | · | |
| U+02B3 | ʳ | 691 | Modifier Letter Small R | · | |
| U+02B4 | ʴ | 692 | Modifier Letter Small Turned R | · | |
| U+02B5 | ʵ | 693 | Modifier Letter Small Turned R with hook | · | |
| U+02B6 | ʶ | 694 | Modifier Letter Small Capital Inverted R | · | |
| U+02B7 | ʷ | 695 | Modifier Letter Small W | · | |
| U+02B8 | ʸ | 696 | Modifier Letter Small Y | · | |
| U+02B9 | ʹ | 697 | Modifier Letter Prime | · | |
| U+02BA | ʺ | 698 | Modifier Letter Double Prime | · | |
| U+02BB | ʻ | 699 | Modifier Letter Turned Comma | 0356 | in Sami |
| U+02BC | ʼ | 700 | Modifier Letter Apostrophe | 0357 | in ISO/IEC 8859-7 |
| U+02BD | ʽ | 701 | Modifier Letter Reversed Comma | 0358 | in ISO/IEC 8859-7 |
| U+02BE | ʾ | 702 | Modifier Letter Right Half Ring | · | |
| U+02BF | ʿ | 703 | Modifier Letter Left Half Ring | · | |
| U+02C0 | ˀ | 704 | Modifier Letter Glottal Stop | · | |
| U+02C1 | ˁ | 705 | Modifier Letter Reversed Glottal Stop | · | |
| U+02C2 | ˂ | 706 | Modifier Letter Left Arrowhead | · | |
| U+02C3 | ˃ | 707 | Modifier Letter Right Arrowhead | · | |
| U+02C4 | ˄ | 708 | Modifier Letter Up Arrowhead | · | |
| U+02C5 | ˅ | 709 | Modifier Letter Down Arrowhead | · | |
| U+02C6 | ˆ | 710 | Modifier Letter Circumflex Accent | 0359 | in WGL4 |
| U+02C7 | ˇ | 711 | Caron | 0360 | in WGL4 |
| U+02C8 | ˈ | 712 | Modifier Letter Vertical Line | · | |
| U+02C9 | ˉ | 713 | Modifier Letter Macron | 0361 | in WGL4 |
| U+02CA | ˊ | 714 | Modifier Letter Acute Accent | · | |
| U+02CB | ˋ | 715 | Modifier Letter Grave Accent | · | |
| U+02CC | ˌ | 716 | Modifier Letter Low Vertical Line | · | |
| U+02CD | ˍ | 717 | Modifier Letter Low Macron | · | |
| U+02CE | ˎ | 718 | Modifier Letter Low Grave Accent | · | |
| U+02CF | ˏ | 719 | Modifier Letter Low Acute Accent | · | |
| U+02D0 | ː | 720 | Modifier Letter Triangular Colon | · | |
| U+02D1 | ˑ | 721 | Modifier Letter Half Triangular Colon | · | |
| U+02D2 | ˒ | 722 | Modifier Letter Centered Right Half Ring | · | |
| U+02D3 | ˓ | 723 | Modifier Letter Centered Left Half Ring | · | |
| U+02D4 | ˔ | 724 | Modifier Letter Up Tack | · | |
| U+02D5 | ˕ | 725 | Modifier Letter Down Tack | · | |
| U+02D6 | ˖ | 726 | Modifier Letter Plus Sign | 0362 | in WGL4 (?) |
| U+02D7 | ˗ | 727 | Modifier Letter Minus Sign | · | |
| U+02D8 | ˘ | 728 | Breve | 0363 | in WGL4 |
| U+02D9 | ˙ | 729 | Dot Above | 0364 | in WGL4 |
| U+02DA | ˚ | 730 | Ring Above | 0365 | in WGL4 |
| U+02DB | ˛ | 731 | Ogonek | 0366 | in WGL4 |
| U+02DC | ˜ | 732 | Small Tilde | 0367 | in WGL4 |
| U+02DD | ˝ | 733 | Double Acute Accent | 0368 | in WGL4 |
| U+02DE | ˞ | 734 | Modifier Letter Rhotic Hook | · | |
| U+02DF | ˟ | 735 | Modifier Letter Cross Accent | 0369 | for Swedish dictionary use |
| U+02E0 | ˠ | 736 | Modifier Letter Small Gamma | · | |
| U+02E1 | ˡ | 737 | Modifier Letter Small L | · | |
| U+02E2 | ˢ | 738 | Modifier Letter Small S | · | |
| U+02E3 | ˣ | 739 | Modifier Letter Small X | · | |
| U+02E4 | ˤ | 740 | Modifier Letter Small Reversed Glottal Stop | · | |
| U+02E5 | ˥ | 741 | Modifier Letter Extra-High Tone Bar | · | |
| U+02E6 | ˦ | 742 | Modifier Letter High Tone Bar | · | |
| U+02E7 | ˧ | 743 | Modifier Letter Mid Tone Bar | · | |
| U+02E8 | ˨ | 744 | Modifier Letter Low Tone Bar | · | |
| U+02E9 | ˩ | 745 | Modifier Letter Extra-Low Tone Bar | · | |
| U+02EA | ˪ | 746 | Modifier Letter Yin Departing Tone Mark | · | |
| U+02EB | ˫ | 747 | Modifier Letter Yang Departing Tone Mark | · | |
| U+02EC | ˬ | 748 | Modifier Letter Voicing | · | |
| U+02ED | ˭ | 749 | Modifier Letter Unaspirated | · | |
| U+02EE | ˮ | 750 | Modifier Letter Double Apostrophe | 0370 | for Nenets |
| U+02EF | ˯ | 751 | Modifier Letter Low Down Arrowhead | · | |
| U+02F0 | ˰ | 752 | Modifier Letter Low Up Arrowhead | · | |
| U+02F1 | ˱ | 753 | Modifier Letter Low Left Arrowhead | · | |
| U+02F2 | ˲ | 754 | Modifier Letter Low Right Arrowhead | · | |
| U+02F3 | ˳ | 755 | Modifier Letter Low Ring | · | |
| U+02F4 | ˴ | 756 | Modifier Letter Middle Grave Accent | · | |
| U+02F5 | ˵ | 757 | Modifier Letter Middle Double Grave Accent | · | |
| U+02F6 | ˶ | 758 | Modifier Letter Middle Double Acute Accent | · | |
| U+02F7 | ˷ | 759 | Modifier Letter Low Tilde | · | |
| U+02F8 | ˸ | 760 | Modifier Letter Raised Colon | · | |
| U+02F9 | ˹ | 761 | Modifier Letter Begin High Tone | · | |
| U+02FA | ˺ | 762 | Modifier Letter End High Tone | · | |
| U+02FB | ˻ | 763 | Modifier Letter Begin Low Tone | · | |
| U+02FC | ˼ | 764 | Modifier Letter End Low Tone | · | |
| U+02FD | ˽ | 765 | Modifier Letter Shelf | · | |
| U+02FE | ˾ | 766 | Modifier Letter Open Shelf | · | |
| U+02FF | ˿ | 767 | Modifier Letter Low Left Arrow | · | |
| Code | Glyph | Decimal | Description | # | MES-2 Rationale |

==== Phonetic Extensions ====
- Phonetic Extensions
- Phonetic Extensions Supplement

==== Modifier Tone Letters ====
- Modifier Tone Letters

=== Combining marks ===
| Code | Glyph | Decimal | Description |
|---|---|---|---|
| U+0300 | ̀ | 768 | Combining Grave Accent |
| U+0301 | ́ | 769 | Combining Acute Accent |
| U+0302 | ̂ | 770 | Combining Circumflex Accent |
| U+0303 | ̃ | 771 | Combining Tilde |
| U+0304 | ̄ | 772 | Combining Macron |
| U+0305 | ̅ | 773 | Combining Overline |
| U+0306 | ̆ | 774 | Combining Breve |
| U+0307 | ̇ | 775 | Combining Dot Above |
| U+0308 | ̈ | 776 | Combining Diaeresis |
| U+0309 | ̉ | 777 | Combining Hook Above |
| U+030A | ̊ | 778 | Combining Ring Above |
| U+030B | ̋ | 779 | Combining Double Acute Accent |
| U+030C | ̌ | 780 | Combining Caron |
| U+030D | ̍ | 781 | Combining Vertical Line Above |
| U+030E | ̎ | 782 | Combining Double Vertical Line Above |
| U+030F | ̏ | 783 | Combining Double Grave Accent |
| U+0310 | ̐ | 784 | Combining Candrabindu |
| U+0311 | ̑ | 785 | Combining Inverted Breve |
| U+0312 | ̒ | 786 | Combining Turned Comma Above |
| U+0313 | ̓ | 787 | Combining Comma Above |
| U+0314 | ̔ | 788 | Combining Reversed Comma Above |
| U+0315 | ̕ | 789 | Combining Comma Above Right |
| U+0316 | ̖ | 790 | Combining Grave Accent Below |
| U+0317 | ̗ | 791 | Combining Acute Accent Below |
| U+0318 | ̘ | 792 | Combining Left Tack Below |
| U+0319 | ̙ | 793 | Combining Right Tack Below |
| U+031A | ̚ | 794 | Combining Left Angle Above |
| U+031B | ̛ | 795 | Combining Horn |
| U+031C | ̜ | 796 | Combining Left Half Ring Below |
| U+031D | ̝ | 797 | Combining Up Tack Below |
| U+031E | ̞ | 798 | Combining Down Tack Below |
| U+031F | ̟ | 799 | Combining Plus Sign Below |
| U+0320 | ̠ | 800 | Combining Minus Sign Below |
| U+0321 | ̡ | 801 | Combining Palatalized Hook Below |
| U+0322 | ̢ | 802 | Combining Retroflex Hook Below |
| U+0323 | ̣ | 803 | Combining Dot Below |
| U+0324 | ̤ | 804 | Combining Diaeresis Below |
| U+0325 | ̥ | 805 | Combining Ring Below |
| U+0326 | ̦ | 806 | Combining Comma Below |
| U+0327 | ̧ | 807 | Combining Cedilla |
| U+0328 | ̨ | 808 | Combining Ogonek |
| U+0329 | ̩ | 809 | Combining Vertical Line Below |
| U+032A | ̪ | 810 | Combining Bridge Below |
| U+032B | ̫ | 811 | Combining Inverted Double Arch Below |
| U+032C | ̬ | 812 | Combining Caron Below |
| U+032D | ̭ | 813 | Combining Circumflex Accent Below |
| U+032E | ̮ | 814 | Combining Breve Below |
| U+032F | ̯ | 815 | Combining Inverted Breve Below |
| U+0330 | ̰ | 816 | Combining Tilde Below |
| U+0331 | ̱ | 817 | Combining Macron Below |
| U+0332 | ̲ | 818 | Combining Low Line |
| U+0333 | ̳ | 819 | Combining Double Low Line |
| U+0334 | ̴ | 820 | Combining Tilde Overlay |
| U+0335 | ̵ | 821 | Combining Short Stroke Overlay |
| U+0336 | ̶ | 822 | Combining Long Stroke Overlay |
| U+0337 | ̷ | 823 | Combining Short Solidus Overlay |
| U+0338 | ̸ | 824 | Combining Long Solidus Overlay |
| U+0339 | ̹ | 825 | Combining Right Half Ring Below |
| U+033A | ̺ | 826 | Combining Inverted Bridge Below |
| U+033B | ̻ | 827 | Combining Square Below |
| U+033C | ̼ | 828 | Combining Seagull Below |
| U+033D | ̽ | 829 | Combining X Above |
| U+033E | ̾ | 830 | Combining Vertical Tilde |
| U+033F | ̿ | 831 | Combining Double Overline |
| U+0340 | ̀ | 832 | Combining Grave Tone Mark |
| U+0341 | ́ | 833 | Combining Acute Tone Mark |
| U+0342 | ͂ | 834 | Combining Greek Perispomeni |
| U+0343 | ̓ | 835 | Combining Greek Koronis |
| U+0344 | ̈́ | 836 | Combining Greek Dialytika Tonos |
| U+0345 | ͅ | 837 | Combining Greek Ypogegrammeni |
| U+0346 | ͆ | 838 | Combining Bridge Above |
| U+0347 | ͇ | 839 | Combining Equals Sign Below |
| U+0348 | ͈ | 840 | Combining Double Vertical Line Below |
| U+0349 | ͉ | 841 | Combining Left Angle Below |
| U+034A | ͊ | 842 | Combining Not Tilde Above |
| U+034B | ͋ | 843 | Combining Homothetic Above |
| U+034C | ͌ | 844 | Combining Almost Equal To Above |
| U+034D | ͍ | 845 | Combining Left Right Arrow Below |
| U+034E | ͎ | 846 | Combining Upwards Arrow Below |
| U+034F | ͏ | 847 | Combining Grapheme Joiner |
| U+0350 | ͐ | 848 | Combining Right Arrowhead Above |
| U+0351 | ͑ | 849 | Combining Left Half Ring Above |
| U+0352 | ͒ | 850 | Combining Fermata |
| U+0353 | ͓ | 851 | Combining X Below |
| U+0354 | ͔ | 852 | Combining Left Arrowhead Below |
| U+0355 | ͕ | 853 | Combining Right Arrowhead Below |
| U+0356 | ͖ | 854 | Combining Right Arrowhead And Up Arrowhead Below |
| U+0357 | ͗ | 855 | Combining Right Half Ring Above |
| U+0358 | ͘ | 856 | Combining Dot Above Right |
| U+0359 | ͙ | 857 | Combining Asterisk Below |
| U+035A | ͚ | 858 | Combining Double Ring Below |
| U+035B | ͛ | 859 | Combining Zigzag Above |
| U+035C | ͜ | 860 | Combining Double Breve Below |
| U+035D | ͝ | 861 | Combining Double Breve |
| U+035E | ͞ | 862 | Combining Double Macron |
| U+035F | ͟ | 863 | Combining Double Macron Below |
| U+0360 | ͠ | 864 | Combining Double Tilde |
| U+0361 | ͡ | 865 | Combining Double Inverted Breve |
| U+0362 | ͢ | 866 | Combining Double Rightwards Arrow Below |
| U+0363 | ͣ | 867 | Combining Latin Small Letter A |
| U+0364 | ͤ | 868 | Combining Latin Small Letter E |
| U+0365 | ͥ | 869 | Combining Latin Small Letter I |
| U+0366 | ͦ | 870 | Combining Latin Small Letter O |
| U+0367 | ͧ | 871 | Combining Latin Small Letter U |
| U+0368 | ͨ | 872 | Combining Latin Small Letter C |
| U+0369 | ͩ | 873 | Combining Latin Small Letter D |
| U+036A | ͪ | 874 | Combining Latin Small Letter H |
| U+036B | ͫ | 875 | Combining Latin Small Letter M |
| U+036C | ͬ | 876 | Combining Latin Small Letter R |
| U+036D | ͭ | 877 | Combining Latin Small Letter T |
| U+036E | ͮ | 878 | Combining Latin Small Letter V |
| U+036F | ͯ | 879 | Combining Latin Small Letter X |

=== Greek and Coptic ===
144 code points; 135 assigned characters; 85 in the MES-2 subset.

| Code | Glyph | Decimal | Description | # |
|---|---|---|---|---|
| U+0370 | Ͱ | 880 | Greek Capital Letter Heta | · |
| U+0371 | ͱ | 881 | Greek Small Letter Heta | · |
| U+0372 | Ͳ | 882 | Greek Capital Letter Archaic Sampi | · |
| U+0373 | ͳ | 883 | Greek Small Letter Archaic Sampi | · |
| U+0374 | ʹ | 884 | Greek Numeral Sign | 0371 |
| U+0375 | ͵ | 885 | Greek Lower Numeral Sign | 0372 |
| U+0376 | Ͷ | 886 | Greek Capital Letter Pamphylian Digamma | · |
| U+0377 | ͷ | 887 | Greek Small Letter Pamphylian Digamma | · |
| U+037A | ͺ | 890 | Greek Ypogegrammeni | 0373 |
| U+037B | ͻ | 891 | Greek Small Reversed Lunate Sigma Symbol | · |
| U+037C | ͼ | 892 | Greek Small Dotted Lunate Sigma Symbol | · |
| U+037D | ͽ | 893 | Greek Small Reversed Dotted Lunate Sigma Symbol | · |
| U+037E | ; | 894 | Greek Question Mark | 0374 |
| U+037F | Ϳ | 895 | Greek Capital Letter Yot | · |
| U+0384 | ΄ | 900 | Greek acute accent (tonos) | 0375 |
| U+0385 | ΅ | 901 | Greek diaeresis with acute accent | 0376 |
| U+0386 | Ά | 902 | Greek Capital Letter A with acute accent | 0377 |
| U+0387 | · | 903 | Greek Ano Teleia | 0378 |
| U+0388 | Έ | 904 | Greek Capital Letter Epsilon with acute accent | 0379 |
| U+0389 | Ή | 905 | Greek Capital Letter Eta with acute accent | 0380 |
| U+038A | Ί | 906 | Greek Capital Letter Iota with acute accent | 0381 |
| U+038C | Ό | 908 | Greek Capital Letter Omicron with acute accent | 0382 |
| U+038E | Ύ | 910 | Greek Capital Letter Upsilon with acute accent | 0383 |
| U+038F | Ώ | 911 | Greek Capital Letter Omega with acute accent | 0384 |
| U+0390 | ΐ | 912 | Greek Small Letter Iota with diaeresis and acute accent | 0385 |
| U+0391 | Α | 913 | Greek Capital Letter Alpha | 0386 |
| U+0392 | Β | 914 | Greek Capital Letter Beta | 0387 |
| U+0393 | Γ | 915 | Greek Capital Letter Gamma | 0388 |
| U+0394 | Δ | 916 | Greek Capital Letter Delta | 0389 |
| U+0395 | Ε | 917 | Greek Capital Letter Epsilon | 0390 |
| U+0396 | Ζ | 918 | Greek Capital Letter Zeta | 0391 |
| U+0397 | Η | 919 | Greek Capital Letter Eta | 0392 |
| U+0398 | Θ | 920 | Greek Capital Letter Theta | 0393 |
| U+0399 | Ι | 921 | Greek Capital Letter Iota | 0394 |
| U+039A | Κ | 922 | Greek Capital Letter Kappa | 0395 |
| U+039B | Λ | 923 | Greek Capital Letter Lambda | 0396 |
| U+039C | Μ | 924 | Greek Capital Letter Mu | 0397 |
| U+039D | Ν | 925 | Greek Capital Letter Nu | 0398 |
| U+039E | Ξ | 926 | Greek Capital Letter Xi | 0399 |
| U+039F | Ο | 927 | Greek Capital Letter Omicron | 0400 |
| U+03A0 | Π | 928 | Greek Capital Letter Pi | 0401 |
| U+03A1 | Ρ | 929 | Greek Capital Letter Rho | 0402 |
| U+03A3 | Σ | 931 | Greek Capital Letter Sigma | 0403 |
| U+03A4 | Τ | 932 | Greek Capital Letter Tau | 0404 |
| U+03A5 | Υ | 933 | Greek Capital Letter Upsilon | 0405 |
| U+03A6 | Φ | 934 | Greek Capital Letter Phi | 0406 |
| U+03A7 | Χ | 935 | Greek Capital Letter Chi | 0407 |
| U+03A8 | Ψ | 936 | Greek Capital Letter Psi | 0408 |
| U+03A9 | Ω | 937 | Greek Capital Letter Omega | 0409 |
| U+03AA | Ϊ | 938 | Greek Capital Letter Iota with diaeresis | 0410 |
| U+03AB | Ϋ | 939 | Greek Capital Letter Upsilon with diaeresis | 0411 |
| U+03AC | ά | 940 | Greek Small Letter Alpha with acute accent | 0412 |
| U+03AD | έ | 941 | Greek Small Letter Epsilon with acute accent | 0413 |
| U+03AE | ή | 942 | Greek Small Letter Eta with acute accent | 0414 |
| U+03AF | ί | 943 | Greek Small Letter Iota with acute accent | 0415 |
| U+03B0 | ΰ | 944 | Greek Small Letter Upsilon with diaeresis and acute accent | 0416 |
| U+03B1 | α | 945 | Greek Small Letter Alpha | 0417 |
| U+03B2 | β | 946 | Greek Small Letter Beta | 0418 |
| U+03B3 | γ | 947 | Greek Small Letter Gamma | 0419 |
| U+03B4 | δ | 948 | Greek Small Letter Delta | 0420 |
| U+03B5 | ε | 949 | Greek Small Letter Epsilon | 0421 |
| U+03B6 | ζ | 950 | Greek Small Letter Zeta | 0422 |
| U+03B7 | η | 951 | Greek Small Letter Eta | 0423 |
| U+03B8 | θ | 952 | Greek Small Letter Theta | 0424 |
| U+03B9 | ι | 953 | Greek Small Letter Iota | 0425 |
| U+03BA | κ | 954 | Greek Small Letter Kappa | 0426 |
| U+03BB | λ | 955 | Greek Small Letter Lambda | 0427 |
| U+03BC | μ | 956 | Greek Small Letter Mu | 0428 |
| U+03BD | ν | 957 | Greek Small Letter Nu | 0429 |
| U+03BE | ξ | 958 | Greek Small Letter Xi | 0430 |
| U+03BF | ο | 959 | Greek Small Letter Omicron | 0431 |
| U+03C0 | π | 960 | Greek Small Letter Pi | 0432 |
| U+03C1 | ρ | 961 | Greek Small Letter Rho | 0433 |
| U+03C2 | ς | 962 | Greek Small Letter Final Sigma | 0434 |
| U+03C3 | σ | 963 | Greek Small Letter Sigma | 0435 |
| U+03C4 | τ | 964 | Greek Small Letter Tau | 0436 |
| U+03C5 | υ | 965 | Greek Small Letter Upsilon | 0437 |
| U+03C6 | φ | 966 | Greek Small Letter Phi | 0438 |
| U+03C7 | χ | 967 | Greek Small Letter Chi | 0439 |
| U+03C8 | ψ | 968 | Greek Small Letter Psi | 0440 |
| U+03C9 | ω | 969 | Greek Small Letter Omega | 0441 |
| U+03CA | ϊ | 970 | Greek Small Letter Iota with diaeresis | 0442 |
| U+03CB | ϋ | 971 | Greek Small Letter Upsilon with diaeresis | 0443 |
| U+03CC | ό | 972 | Greek Small Letter Omicron with acute accent | 0444 |
| U+03CD | ύ | 973 | Greek Small Letter Upsilon with acute accent | 0445 |
| U+03CE | ώ | 974 | Greek Small Letter Omega with acute accent | 0446 |
| U+03CF | Ϗ | 975 | Greek Capital Kai Symbol | · |
| U+03D0 | ϐ | 976 | Greek Beta Symbol | · |
| U+03D1 | ϑ | 977 | Greek Theta Symbol | · |
| U+03D2 | ϒ | 978 | Greek Upsilon with hook Symbol | · |
| U+03D3 | ϓ | 979 | Greek Upsilon with acute and hook Symbol | · |
| U+03D4 | ϔ | 980 | Greek Upsilon with diaeresis and hook Symbol | · |
| U+03D5 | ϕ | 981 | Greek Phi Symbol | · |
| U+03D6 | ϖ | 982 | Greek Pi Symbol | · |
| U+03D7 | ϗ | 983 | Greek Kai Symbol | 0447 |
| U+03D8 | Ϙ | 984 | Greek Letter Qoppa | · |
| U+03D9 | ϙ | 985 | Greek Small Letter Qoppa | · |
| U+03DA | Ϛ | 986 | Greek Letter Stigma | 0448 |
| U+03DB | ϛ | 987 | Greek Small Letter Stigma | 0449 |
| U+03DC | Ϝ | 988 | Greek Letter Digamma | 0450 |
| U+03DD | ϝ | 989 | Greek Small Letter Digamma | 0451 |
| U+03DE | Ϟ | 990 | Greek Letter Koppa | 0452 |
| U+03DF | ϟ | 991 | Greek Small Letter Koppa | 0453 |
| U+03E0 | Ϡ | 992 | Greek Letter Sampi | 0454 |
| U+03E1 | ϡ | 993 | Greek Small Letter Sampi | 0455 |
| U+03E2 | Ϣ | 994 | Coptic Capital Letter Shei | · |
| U+03E3 | ϣ | 995 | Coptic Small Letter Shei | · |
| U+03E4 | Ϥ | 996 | Coptic Capital Letter Fei | · |
| U+03E5 | ϥ | 997 | Coptic Small Letter Fei | · |
| U+03E6 | Ϧ | 998 | Coptic Capital Letter Khei | · |
| U+03E7 | ϧ | 999 | Coptic Small Letter Khei | · |
| U+03E8 | Ϩ | 1000 | Coptic Capital Letter Hori | · |
| U+03E9 | ϩ | 1001 | Coptic Small Letter Hori | · |
| U+03EA | Ϫ | 1002 | Coptic Capital Letter Gangia | · |
| U+03EB | ϫ | 1003 | Coptic Small Letter Gangia | · |
| U+03EC | Ϭ | 1004 | Coptic Capital Letter Shima | · |
| U+03ED | ϭ | 1005 | Coptic Small Letter Shima | · |
| U+03EE | Ϯ | 1006 | Coptic Capital Letter Dei | · |
| U+03EF | ϯ | 1007 | Coptic Small Letter Dei | · |
| U+03F0 | ϰ | 1008 | Greek Kappa Symbol | · |
| U+03F1 | ϱ | 1009 | Greek Rho Symbol | · |
| U+03F2 | ϲ | 1010 | Greek Lunate Sigma Symbol | · |
| U+03F3 | ϳ | 1011 | Greek Letter Yot | · |
| U+03F4 | ϴ | 1012 | Greek Capital Theta Symbol | · |
| U+03F5 | ϵ | 1013 | Greek Lunate Epsilon Symbol | · |
| U+03F6 | ϶ | 1014 | Greek Reversed Lunate Epsilon Symbol | · |
| U+03F7 | Ϸ | 1015 | Greek Capital Sho | · |
| U+03F8 | ϸ | 1016 | Greek Small Letter Sho | · |
| U+03F9 | Ϲ | 1017 | Greek Capital Lunate Sigma Symbol | · |
| U+03FA | Ϻ | 1018 | Greek Capital San | · |
| U+03FB | ϻ | 1019 | Greek Small Letter San | · |
| U+03FC | ϼ | 1020 | Greek Rho with stroke Symbol | · |
| U+03FD | Ͻ | 1021 | Greek Capital Reversed Lunate Sigma Symbol | · |
| U+03FE | Ͼ | 1022 | Greek Capital Dotted Lunate Sigma Symbol | · |
| U+03FF | Ͽ | 1023 | Greek Capital Reversed Dotted Lunate Sigma Symbol | · |
| Code | Glyph | Decimal | Description | # |

==== Greek Extended ====
For polytonic orthography. 256 code points; 233 assigned characters, all in the MES-2 subset (#670 – 902).

Greek Extended^{[1]}^{[2]} Official Unicode Consortium code chart (PDF)
| | 0 | 1 | 2 | 3 | 4 | 5 | 6 | 7 | 8 | 9 | A | B | C | D | E | F |
| U+1F0x | ἀ | ἁ | ἂ | ἃ | ἄ | ἅ | ἆ | ἇ | Ἀ | Ἁ | Ἂ | Ἃ | Ἄ | Ἅ | Ἆ | Ἇ |
| U+1F1x | ἐ | ἑ | ἒ | ἓ | ἔ | ἕ | | | Ἐ | Ἑ | Ἒ | Ἓ | Ἔ | Ἕ | | |
| U+1F2x | ἠ | ἡ | ἢ | ἣ | ἤ | ἥ | ἦ | ἧ | Ἠ | Ἡ | Ἢ | Ἣ | Ἤ | Ἥ | Ἦ | Ἧ |
| U+1F3x | ἰ | ἱ | ἲ | ἳ | ἴ | ἵ | ἶ | ἷ | Ἰ | Ἱ | Ἲ | Ἳ | Ἴ | Ἵ | Ἶ | Ἷ |
| U+1F4x | ὀ | ὁ | ὂ | ὃ | ὄ | ὅ | | | Ὀ | Ὁ | Ὂ | Ὃ | Ὄ | Ὅ | | |
| U+1F5x | ὐ | ὑ | ὒ | ὓ | ὔ | ὕ | ὖ | ὗ | | Ὑ | | Ὓ | | Ὕ | | Ὗ |
| U+1F6x | ὠ | ὡ | ὢ | ὣ | ὤ | ὥ | ὦ | ὧ | Ὠ | Ὡ | Ὢ | Ὣ | Ὤ | Ὥ | Ὦ | Ὧ |
| U+1F7x | ὰ | ά | ὲ | έ | ὴ | ή | ὶ | ί | ὸ | ό | ὺ | ύ | ὼ | ώ | | |
| U+1F8x | ᾀ | ᾁ | ᾂ | ᾃ | ᾄ | ᾅ | ᾆ | ᾇ | ᾈ | ᾉ | ᾊ | ᾋ | ᾌ | ᾍ | ᾎ | ᾏ |
| U+1F9x | ᾐ | ᾑ | ᾒ | ᾓ | ᾔ | ᾕ | ᾖ | ᾗ | ᾘ | ᾙ | ᾚ | ᾛ | ᾜ | ᾝ | ᾞ | ᾟ |
| U+1FAx | ᾠ | ᾡ | ᾢ | ᾣ | ᾤ | ᾥ | ᾦ | ᾧ | ᾨ | ᾩ | ᾪ | ᾫ | ᾬ | ᾭ | ᾮ | ᾯ |
| U+1FBx | ᾰ | ᾱ | ᾲ | ᾳ | ᾴ | | ᾶ | ᾷ | Ᾰ | Ᾱ | Ὰ | Ά | ᾼ | ᾽ | ι | ᾿ |
| U+1FCx | ῀ | ῁ | ῂ | ῃ | ῄ | | ῆ | ῇ | Ὲ | Έ | Ὴ | Ή | ῌ | ῍ | ῎ | ῏ |
| U+1FDx | ῐ | ῑ | ῒ | ΐ | | | ῖ | ῗ | Ῐ | Ῑ | Ὶ | Ί | | ῝ | ῞ | ῟ |
| U+1FEx | ῠ | ῡ | ῢ | ΰ | ῤ | ῥ | ῦ | ῧ | Ῠ | Ῡ | Ὺ | Ύ | Ῥ | ῭ | ΅ | ` |
| U+1FFx | | | ῲ | ῳ | ῴ | | ῶ | ῷ | Ὸ | Ό | Ὼ | Ώ | ῼ | ´ | ῾ | |
Notes 1.As of Unicode version 18.0 2.Grey areas indicate non-assigned code points

==== Ancient Greek Numbers ====
Ancient Greek Numbers^{[1]}^{[2]} Official Unicode Consortium code chart (PDF)
| | 0 | 1 | 2 | 3 | 4 | 5 | 6 | 7 | 8 | 9 | A | B | C | D | E | F |
| U+1014x | 𐅀 | 𐅁 | 𐅂 | 𐅃 | 𐅄 | 𐅅 | 𐅆 | 𐅇 | 𐅈 | 𐅉 | 𐅊 | 𐅋 | 𐅌 | 𐅍 | 𐅎 | 𐅏 |
| U+1015x | 𐅐 | 𐅑 | 𐅒 | 𐅓 | 𐅔 | 𐅕 | 𐅖 | 𐅗 | 𐅘 | 𐅙 | 𐅚 | 𐅛 | 𐅜 | 𐅝 | 𐅞 | 𐅟 |
| U+1016x | 𐅠 | 𐅡 | 𐅢 | 𐅣 | 𐅤 | 𐅥 | 𐅦 | 𐅧 | 𐅨 | 𐅩 | 𐅪 | 𐅫 | 𐅬 | 𐅭 | 𐅮 | 𐅯 |
| U+1017x | 𐅰 | 𐅱 | 𐅲 | 𐅳 | 𐅴 | 𐅵 | 𐅶 | 𐅷 | 𐅸 | 𐅹 | 𐅺 | 𐅻 | 𐅼 | 𐅽 | 𐅾 | 𐅿 |
| U+1018x | 𐆀 | 𐆁 | 𐆂 | 𐆃 | 𐆄 | 𐆅 | 𐆆 | 𐆇 | 𐆈 | 𐆉 | 𐆊 | 𐆋 | 𐆌 | 𐆍 | 𐆎 | |
Notes 1.As of Unicode version 18.0 2.Grey area indicates non-assigned code point

==== Coptic Epact Numbers ====
Coptic Epact Numbers^{[1]}^{[2]} Official Unicode Consortium code chart (PDF)
| | 0 | 1 | 2 | 3 | 4 | 5 | 6 | 7 | 8 | 9 | A | B | C | D | E | F |
| U+102Ex | 𐋠 | 𐋡 | 𐋢 | 𐋣 | 𐋤 | 𐋥 | 𐋦 | 𐋧 | 𐋨 | 𐋩 | 𐋪 | 𐋫 | 𐋬 | 𐋭 | 𐋮 | 𐋯 |
| U+102Fx | 𐋰 | 𐋱 | 𐋲 | 𐋳 | 𐋴 | 𐋵 | 𐋶 | 𐋷 | 𐋸 | 𐋹 | 𐋺 | 𐋻 | | | | |
Notes 1.As of Unicode version 18.0 2.Grey areas indicate non-assigned code points

=== Cyrillic ===
256 characters; 191 in the MES-2 subset.

| Code | Glyph | Description | # |
|---|---|---|---|
| U+0400 | Ѐ | Cyrillic Capital Letter Ie with grave | 0456 |
| U+0401 | Ё | Cyrillic Capital Letter Io | 0457 |
| U+0402 | Ђ | Cyrillic Capital Letter Dje | 0458 |
| U+0403 | Ѓ | Cyrillic Capital Letter Gje | 0459 |
| U+0404 | Є | Cyrillic Capital Letter Ukrainian Ie | 0460 |
| U+0405 | Ѕ | Cyrillic Capital Letter Dze | 0461 |
| U+0406 | І | Cyrillic Capital Letter Byelorussian-Ukrainian I | 0462 |
| U+0407 | Ї | Cyrillic Capital Letter Yi | 0463 |
| U+0408 | Ј | Cyrillic Capital Letter Je | 0464 |
| U+0409 | Љ | Cyrillic Capital Letter Lje | 0465 |
| U+040A | Њ | Cyrillic Capital Letter Nje | 0466 |
| U+040B | Ћ | Cyrillic Capital Letter Tshe | 0467 |
| U+040C | Ќ | Cyrillic Capital Letter Kje | 0468 |
| U+040D | Ѝ | Cyrillic Capital Letter I with grave | 0469 |
| U+040E | Ў | Cyrillic Capital Letter Short U | 0470 |
| U+040F | Џ | Cyrillic Capital Letter Dzhe | 0471 |
| U+0410 | А | Cyrillic Capital Letter A | 0472 |
| U+0411 | Б | Cyrillic Capital Letter Be | 0473 |
| U+0412 | В | Cyrillic Capital Letter Ve | 0474 |
| U+0413 | Г | Cyrillic Capital Letter Ghe | 0475 |
| U+0414 | Д | Cyrillic Capital Letter De | 0476 |
| U+0415 | Е | Cyrillic Capital Letter Ie | 0477 |
| U+0416 | Ж | Cyrillic Capital Letter Zhe | 0478 |
| U+0417 | З | Cyrillic Capital Letter Ze | 0479 |
| U+0418 | И | Cyrillic Capital Letter I | 0480 |
| U+0419 | Й | Cyrillic Capital Letter Short I | 0481 |
| U+041A | К | Cyrillic Capital Letter Ka | 0482 |
| U+041B | Л | Cyrillic Capital Letter El | 0483 |
| U+041C | М | Cyrillic Capital Letter Em | 0484 |
| U+041D | Н | Cyrillic Capital Letter En | 0485 |
| U+041E | О | Cyrillic Capital Letter O | 0486 |
| U+041F | П | Cyrillic Capital Letter Pe | 0487 |
| U+0420 | Р | Cyrillic Capital Letter Er | 0488 |
| U+0421 | С | Cyrillic Capital Letter Es | 0489 |
| U+0422 | Т | Cyrillic Capital Letter Te | 0490 |
| U+0423 | У | Cyrillic Capital Letter U | 0491 |
| U+0424 | Ф | Cyrillic Capital Letter Ef | 0492 |
| U+0425 | Х | Cyrillic Capital Letter Ha | 0493 |
| U+0426 | Ц | Cyrillic Capital Letter Tse | 0494 |
| U+0427 | Ч | Cyrillic Capital Letter Che | 0495 |
| U+0428 | Ш | Cyrillic Capital Letter Sha | 0496 |
| U+0429 | Щ | Cyrillic Capital Letter Shcha | 0497 |
| U+042A | Ъ | Cyrillic Capital Letter Hard Sign | 0498 |
| U+042B | Ы | Cyrillic Capital Letter Yeru | 0499 |
| U+042C | Ь | Cyrillic Capital Letter Soft Sign | 0500 |
| U+042D | Э | Cyrillic Capital Letter E | 0501 |
| U+042E | Ю | Cyrillic Capital Letter Yu | 0502 |
| U+042F | Я | Cyrillic Capital Letter Ya | 0503 |
| U+0430 | а | Cyrillic Small Letter A | 0504 |
| U+0431 | б | Cyrillic Small Letter Be | 0505 |
| U+0432 | в | Cyrillic Small Letter Ve | 0506 |
| U+0433 | г | Cyrillic Small Letter Ghe | 0507 |
| U+0434 | д | Cyrillic Small Letter De | 0508 |
| U+0435 | е | Cyrillic Small Letter Ie | 0509 |
| U+0436 | ж | Cyrillic Small Letter Zhe | 0510 |
| U+0437 | з | Cyrillic Small Letter Ze | 0511 |
| U+0438 | и | Cyrillic Small Letter I | 0512 |
| U+0439 | й | Cyrillic Small Letter Short I | 0513 |
| U+043A | к | Cyrillic Small Letter Ka | 0514 |
| U+043B | л | Cyrillic Small Letter El | 0515 |
| U+043C | м | Cyrillic Small Letter Em | 0516 |
| U+043D | н | Cyrillic Small Letter En | 0517 |
| U+043E | о | Cyrillic Small Letter O | 0518 |
| U+043F | п | Cyrillic Small Letter Pe | 0519 |
| U+0440 | р | Cyrillic Small Letter Er | 0520 |
| U+0441 | с | Cyrillic Small Letter Es | 0521 |
| U+0442 | т | Cyrillic Small Letter Te | 0522 |
| U+0443 | у | Cyrillic Small Letter U | 0523 |
| U+0444 | ф | Cyrillic Small Letter Ef | 0524 |
| U+0445 | х | Cyrillic Small Letter Ha | 0525 |
| U+0446 | ц | Cyrillic Small Letter Tse | 0526 |
| U+0447 | ч | Cyrillic Small Letter Che | 0527 |
| U+0448 | ш | Cyrillic Small Letter Sha | 0528 |
| U+0449 | щ | Cyrillic Small Letter Shcha | 0529 |
| U+044A | ъ | Cyrillic Small Letter Hard Sign | 0530 |
| U+044B | ы | Cyrillic Small Letter Yeru | 0531 |
| U+044C | ь | Cyrillic Small Letter Soft Sign | 0532 |
| U+044D | э | Cyrillic Small Letter E | 0533 |
| U+044E | ю | Cyrillic Small Letter Yu | 0534 |
| U+044F | я | Cyrillic Small Letter Ya | 0535 |
| U+0450 | ѐ | Cyrillic Small Letter Ie with grave | 0536 |
| U+0451 | ё | Cyrillic Small Letter Io | 0537 |
| U+0452 | ђ | Cyrillic Small Letter Dje | 0538 |
| U+0453 | ѓ | Cyrillic Small Letter Gje | 0539 |
| U+0454 | є | Cyrillic Small Letter Ukrainian Ie | 0540 |
| U+0455 | ѕ | Cyrillic Small Letter Dze | 0541 |
| U+0456 | і | Cyrillic Small Letter Byelorussian-Ukrainian I | 0542 |
| U+0457 | ї | Cyrillic Small Letter Yi | 0543 |
| U+0458 | ј | Cyrillic Small Letter Je | 0544 |
| U+0459 | љ | Cyrillic Small Letter Lje | 0545 |
| U+045A | њ | Cyrillic Small Letter Nje | 0546 |
| U+045B | ћ | Cyrillic Small Letter Tshe | 0547 |
| U+045C | ќ | Cyrillic Small Letter Kje | 0548 |
| U+045D | ѝ | Cyrillic Small Letter I with grave | 0549 |
| U+045E | ў | Cyrillic Small Letter Short U | 0550 |
| U+045F | џ | Cyrillic Small Letter Dzhe | 0551 |
| U+0460 | Ѡ | Cyrillic Capital Letter Omega | · |
| U+0461 | ѡ | Cyrillic Small Letter Omega | · |
| U+0462 | Ѣ | Cyrillic Capital Letter Yat | · |
| U+0463 | ѣ | Cyrillic Small Letter Yat | · |
| U+0464 | Ѥ | Cyrillic Capital Letter Iotified E | · |
| U+0465 | ѥ | Cyrillic Small Letter Iotified E | · |
| U+0466 | Ѧ | Cyrillic Capital Letter Little Yus | · |
| U+0467 | ѧ | Cyrillic Small Letter Little Yus | · |
| U+0468 | Ѩ | Cyrillic Capital Letter Iotified Little Yus | · |
| U+0469 | ѩ | Cyrillic Small Letter Iotified Little Yus | · |
| U+046A | Ѫ | Cyrillic Capital Letter Big Yus | · |
| U+046B | ѫ | Cyrillic Small Letter Big Yus | · |
| U+046C | Ѭ | Cyrillic Capital Letter Iotified Big Yus | · |
| U+046D | ѭ | Cyrillic Small Letter Iotified Big Yus | · |
| U+046E | Ѯ | Cyrillic Capital Letter Ksi | · |
| U+046F | ѯ | Cyrillic Small Letter Ksi | · |
| U+0470 | Ѱ | Cyrillic Capital Letter Psi | · |
| U+0471 | ѱ | Cyrillic Small Letter Psi | · |
| U+0472 | Ѳ | Cyrillic Capital Letter Fita | · |
| U+0473 | ѳ | Cyrillic Small Letter Fita | · |
| U+0474 | Ѵ | Cyrillic Capital Letter Izhitsa | · |
| U+0475 | ѵ | Cyrillic Small Letter Izhitsa | · |
| U+0476 | Ѷ | Cyrillic Capital Letter Izhitsa with double grave accent | · |
| U+0477 | ѷ | Cyrillic Small Letter Izhitsa with double grave accent | · |
| U+0478 | Ѹ | Cyrillic Capital Letter Uk | · |
| U+0479 | ѹ | Cyrillic Small Letter Uk | · |
| U+047A | Ѻ | Cyrillic Capital Letter Round Omega | · |
| U+047B | ѻ | Cyrillic Small Letter Round Omega | · |
| U+047C | Ѽ | Cyrillic Capital Letter Omega with Titlo | · |
| U+047D | ѽ | Cyrillic Small Letter Omega with Titlo | · |
| U+047E | Ѿ | Cyrillic Capital Letter Ot | · |
| U+047F | ѿ | Cyrillic Small Letter Ot | · |
| U+0480 | Ҁ | Cyrillic Capital Letter Koppa | · |
| U+0481 | ҁ | Cyrillic Small Letter Koppa | · |
| U+0482 | ҂ | Cyrillic Thousands Sign | · |
| U+0483 | ҃ | Combining Cyrillic Titlo | · |
| U+0484 | ҄ | Combining Cyrillic Palatalization | · |
| U+0485 | ҅ | Combining Cyrillic Dasia Pneumata | · |
| U+0486 | ҆ | Combining Cyrillic Psili Pneumata | · |
| U+0487 | ҇ | Combining Cyrillic Pokrytie | · |
| U+0488 | ҈ | Combining Cyrillic Hundred Thousands Sign | · |
| U+0489 | ҉ | Combining Cyrillic Millions Sign | · |
| U+048A | Ҋ | Cyrillic Capital Letter Short I with tail | · |
| U+048B | ҋ | Cyrillic Small Letter Short I with tail | · |
| U+048C | Ҍ | Cyrillic Capital Letter Semisoft Sign | · |
| U+048D | ҍ | Cyrillic Small Letter Semisoft Sign | · |
| U+048E | Ҏ | Cyrillic Capital Letter Er with tick | · |
| U+048F | ҏ | Cyrillic Small Letter Er with tick | · |
| U+0490 | Ґ | Cyrillic Capital Letter Ghe with upturn | 0552 |
| U+0491 | ґ | Cyrillic Small Letter Ghe with upturn | 0553 |
| U+0492 | Ғ | Cyrillic Capital Letter Ghe with stroke | 0554 |
| U+0493 | ғ | Cyrillic Small Letter Ghe with stroke | 0555 |
| U+0494 | Ҕ | Cyrillic Capital Letter Ghe with middle hook | 0556 |
| U+0495 | ҕ | Cyrillic Small Letter Ghe with middle hook | 0557 |
| U+0496 | Җ | Cyrillic Capital Letter Zhe with descender | 0558 |
| U+0497 | җ | Cyrillic Small Letter Zhe with descender | 0559 |
| U+0498 | Ҙ | Cyrillic Capital Letter Ze with descender | 0560 |
| U+0499 | ҙ | Cyrillic Small Letter Ze with descender | 0561 |
| U+049A | Қ | Cyrillic Capital Letter Ka with descender | 0562 |
| U+049B | қ | Cyrillic Small Letter Ka with descender | 0563 |
| U+049C | Ҝ | Cyrillic Capital Letter Ka with vertical stroke | 0564 |
| U+049D | ҝ | Cyrillic Small Letter Ka with vertical stroke | 0565 |
| U+049E | Ҟ | Cyrillic Capital Letter Ka with stroke | 0566 |
| U+049F | ҟ | Cyrillic Small Letter Ka with stroke | 0567 |
| U+04A0 | Ҡ | Cyrillic Capital Letter Bashkir Ka | 0568 |
| U+04A1 | ҡ | Cyrillic Small Letter Bashkir Ka | 0569 |
| U+04A2 | Ң | Cyrillic Capital Letter En with descender | 0570 |
| U+04A3 | ң | Cyrillic Small Letter En with descender | 0571 |
| U+04A4 | Ҥ | Cyrillic Capital Ligature En Ghe | 0572 |
| U+04A5 | ҥ | Cyrillic Small Ligature En Ghe | 0573 |
| U+04A6 | Ҧ | Cyrillic Capital Letter Pe with middle hook | 0574 |
| U+04A7 | ҧ | Cyrillic Small Letter Pe with middle hook | 0575 |
| U+04A8 | Ҩ | Cyrillic Capital Letter Abkhazian Ha | 0576 |
| U+04A9 | ҩ | Cyrillic Small Letter Abkhazian Ha | 0577 |
| U+04AA | Ҫ | Cyrillic Capital Letter Es with descender | 0578 |
| U+04AB | ҫ | Cyrillic Small Letter Es with descender | 0579 |
| U+04AC | Ҭ | Cyrillic Capital Letter Te with descender | 0580 |
| U+04AD | ҭ | Cyrillic Small Letter Te with descender | 0581 |
| U+04AE | Ү | Cyrillic Capital Letter Straight U | 0582 |
| U+04AF | ү | Cyrillic Small Letter Straight U | 0583 |
| U+04B0 | Ұ | Cyrillic Capital Letter Straight U with stroke | 0584 |
| U+04B1 | ұ | Cyrillic Small Letter Straight U with stroke | 0585 |
| U+04B2 | Ҳ | Cyrillic Capital Letter Ha with descender | 0586 |
| U+04B3 | ҳ | Cyrillic Small Letter Ha with descender | 0587 |
| U+04B4 | Ҵ | Cyrillic Capital Ligature Te Tse | 0588 |
| U+04B5 | ҵ | Cyrillic Small Ligature Te Tse | 0589 |
| U+04B6 | Ҷ | Cyrillic Capital Letter Che with descender | 0590 |
| U+04B7 | ҷ | Cyrillic Small Letter Che with descender | 0591 |
| U+04B8 | Ҹ | Cyrillic Capital Letter Che with vertical stroke | 0592 |
| U+04B9 | ҹ | Cyrillic Small Letter Che with vertical stroke | 0593 |
| U+04BA | Һ | Cyrillic Capital Letter Shha | 0594 |
| U+04BB | һ | Cyrillic Small Letter Shha | 0595 |
| U+04BC | Ҽ | Cyrillic Capital Letter Abkhazian Che | 0596 |
| U+04BD | ҽ | Cyrillic Small Letter Abkhazian Che | 0597 |
| U+04BE | Ҿ | Cyrillic Capital Letter Abkhazian Che with descender | 0598 |
| U+04BF | ҿ | Cyrillic Small Letter Abkhazian Che with descender | 0599 |
| U+04C0 | Ӏ | Cyrillic Letter Palochka | 0600 |
| U+04C1 | Ӂ | Cyrillic Capital Letter Zhe with breve | 0601 |
| U+04C2 | ӂ | Cyrillic Small Letter Zhe with breve | 0602 |
| U+04C3 | Ӄ | Cyrillic Capital Letter Ka with hook | 0603 |
| U+04C4 | ӄ | Cyrillic Small Letter Ka with hook | 0604 |
| U+04C5 | Ӆ | Cyrillic Capital Letter El with tail | · |
| U+04C6 | ӆ | Cyrillic Small Letter El with tail | · |
| U+04C7 | Ӈ | Cyrillic Capital Letter En with hook | 0605 |
| U+04C8 | ӈ | Cyrillic Small Letter En with hook | 0606 |
| U+04C9 | Ӊ | Cyrillic Capital Letter En with tail | · |
| U+04CA | ӊ | Cyrillic Small Letter En with tail | · |
| U+04CB | Ӌ | Cyrillic Capital Letter Khakassian Che | 0607 |
| U+04CC | ӌ | Cyrillic Small Letter Khakassian Che | 0608 |
| U+04CD | Ӎ | Cyrillic Capital Letter Em with tail | · |
| U+04CE | ӎ | Cyrillic Small Letter Em with tail | · |
| U+04CF | ӏ | Cyrillic Small Letter Palochka | · |
| U+04D0 | Ӑ | Cyrillic Capital Letter A with breve | 0609 |
| U+04D1 | ӑ | Cyrillic Small Letter A with breve | 0610 |
| U+04D2 | Ӓ | Cyrillic Capital Letter A with diaeresis | 0611 |
| U+04D3 | ӓ | Cyrillic Small Letter A with diaeresis | 0612 |
| U+04D4 | Ӕ | Cyrillic Capital Ligature A Ie | 0613 |
| U+04D5 | ӕ | Cyrillic Small Ligature A Ie | 0614 |
| U+04D6 | Ӗ | Cyrillic Capital Letter Ie with breve | 0615 |
| U+04D7 | ӗ | Cyrillic Small Letter Ie with breve | 0616 |
| U+04D8 | Ә | Cyrillic Capital Letter Schwa | 0617 |
| U+04D9 | ә | Cyrillic Small Letter Schwa | 0618 |
| U+04DA | Ӛ | Cyrillic Capital Letter Schwa with diaeresis | 0619 |
| U+04DB | ӛ | Cyrillic Small Letter Schwa with diaeresis | 0620 |
| U+04DC | Ӝ | Cyrillic Capital Letter Zhe with diaeresis | 0621 |
| U+04DD | ӝ | Cyrillic Small Letter Zhe with diaeresis | 0622 |
| U+04DE | Ӟ | Cyrillic Capital Letter Ze with diaeresis | 0623 |
| U+04DF | ӟ | Cyrillic Small Letter Ze with diaeresis | 0624 |
| U+04E0 | Ӡ | Cyrillic Capital Letter Abkhazian Dze | 0625 |
| U+04E1 | ӡ | Cyrillic Small Letter Abkhazian Dze | 0626 |
| U+04E2 | Ӣ | Cyrillic Capital Letter I with macron | 0627 |
| U+04E3 | ӣ | Cyrillic Small Letter I with macron | 0628 |
| U+04E4 | Ӥ | Cyrillic Capital Letter I with diaeresis | 0629 |
| U+04E5 | ӥ | Cyrillic Small Letter I with diaeresis | 0630 |
| U+04E6 | Ӧ | Cyrillic Capital Letter O with diaeresis | 0631 |
| U+04E7 | ӧ | Cyrillic Small Letter O with diaeresis | 0632 |
| U+04E8 | Ө | Cyrillic Capital Letter Barred O | 0633 |
| U+04E9 | ө | Cyrillic Small Letter Barred O | 0634 |
| U+04EA | Ӫ | Cyrillic Capital Letter Barred O with diaeresis | 0635 |
| U+04EB | ӫ | Cyrillic Small Letter Barred O with diaeresis | 0636 |
| U+04EC | Ӭ | Cyrillic Capital Letter E with diaeresis | · |
| U+04ED | ӭ | Cyrillic Small Letter E with diaeresis | · |
| U+04EE | Ӯ | Cyrillic Capital Letter U with macron | 0637 |
| U+04EF | ӯ | Cyrillic Small Letter U with macron | 0638 |
| U+04F0 | Ӱ | Cyrillic Capital Letter U with diaeresis | 0639 |
| U+04F1 | ӱ | Cyrillic Small Letter U with diaeresis | 0640 |
| U+04F2 | Ӳ | Cyrillic Capital Letter U with double acute | 0641 |
| U+04F3 | ӳ | Cyrillic Small Letter U with double acute | 0642 |
| U+04F4 | Ӵ | Cyrillic Capital Letter Che with diaeresis | 0643 |
| U+04F5 | ӵ | Cyrillic Small Letter Che with diaeresis | 0644 |
| U+04F6 | Ӷ | Cyrillic Capital Letter Ghe with descender | · |
| U+04F7 | ӷ | Cyrillic Small Letter Ghe with descender | · |
| U+04F8 | Ӹ | Cyrillic Capital Letter Yeru with diaeresis | 0645 |
| U+04F9 | ӹ | Cyrillic Small Letter Yeru with diaeresis | 0646 |
| U+04FA | Ӻ | Cyrillic Capital Letter Ghe with stroke and hook | · |
| U+04FB | ӻ | Cyrillic Small Letter Ghe with stroke and hook | · |
| U+04FC | Ӽ | Cyrillic Capital Letter Ha with hook | · |
| U+04FD | ӽ | Cyrillic Small Letter Ha with hook | · |
| U+04FE | Ӿ | Cyrillic Capital Letter Ha with stroke | · |
| U+04FF | ӿ | Cyrillic Small Letter Ha with stroke | · |
| Code | Glyph | Description | # |

==== Cyrillic supplements ====
Cyrillic Supplement^{[1]} Official Unicode Consortium code chart (PDF)
| | 0 | 1 | 2 | 3 | 4 | 5 | 6 | 7 | 8 | 9 | A | B | C | D | E | F |
| U+050x | Ԁ | ԁ | Ԃ | ԃ | Ԅ | ԅ | Ԇ | ԇ | Ԉ | ԉ | Ԋ | ԋ | Ԍ | ԍ | Ԏ | ԏ |
| U+051x | Ԑ | ԑ | Ԓ | ԓ | Ԕ | ԕ | Ԗ | ԗ | Ԙ | ԙ | Ԛ | ԛ | Ԝ | ԝ | Ԟ | ԟ |
| U+052x | Ԡ | ԡ | Ԣ | ԣ | Ԥ | ԥ | Ԧ | ԧ | Ԩ | ԩ | Ԫ | ԫ | Ԭ | ԭ | Ԯ | ԯ |
Notes 1.As of Unicode version 18.0

Cyrillic Extended-A^{[1]} Official Unicode Consortium code chart (PDF)
| | 0 | 1 | 2 | 3 | 4 | 5 | 6 | 7 | 8 | 9 | A | B | C | D | E | F |
| U+2DEx | ⷠ | ⷡ | ⷢ | ⷣ | ⷤ | ⷥ | ⷦ | ⷧ | ⷨ | ⷩ | ⷪ | ⷫ | ⷬ | ⷭ | ⷮ | ⷯ |
| U+2DFx | ⷰ | ⷱ | ⷲ | ⷳ | ⷴ | ⷵ | ⷶ | ⷷ | ⷸ | ⷹ | ⷺ | ⷻ | ⷼ | ⷽ | ⷾ | ⷿ |
Notes 1.As of Unicode version 18.0

Cyrillic Extended-B^{[1]} Official Unicode Consortium code chart (PDF)
| | 0 | 1 | 2 | 3 | 4 | 5 | 6 | 7 | 8 | 9 | A | B | C | D | E | F |
| U+A64x | Ꙁ | ꙁ | Ꙃ | ꙃ | Ꙅ | ꙅ | Ꙇ | ꙇ | Ꙉ | ꙉ | Ꙋ | ꙋ | Ꙍ | ꙍ | Ꙏ | ꙏ |
| U+A65x | Ꙑ | ꙑ | Ꙓ | ꙓ | Ꙕ | ꙕ | Ꙗ | ꙗ | Ꙙ | ꙙ | Ꙛ | ꙛ | Ꙝ | ꙝ | Ꙟ | ꙟ |
| U+A66x | Ꙡ | ꙡ | Ꙣ | ꙣ | Ꙥ | ꙥ | Ꙧ | ꙧ | Ꙩ | ꙩ | Ꙫ | ꙫ | Ꙭ | ꙭ | ꙮ | ꙯ |
| U+A67x | ꙰ | ꙱ | ꙲ | ꙳ | ꙴ | ꙵ | ꙶ | ꙷ | ꙸ | ꙹ | ꙺ | ꙻ | ꙼ | ꙽ | ꙾ | ꙿ |
| U+A68x | Ꚁ | ꚁ | Ꚃ | ꚃ | Ꚅ | ꚅ | Ꚇ | ꚇ | Ꚉ | ꚉ | Ꚋ | ꚋ | Ꚍ | ꚍ | Ꚏ | ꚏ |
| U+A69x | Ꚑ | ꚑ | Ꚓ | ꚓ | Ꚕ | ꚕ | Ꚗ | ꚗ | Ꚙ | ꚙ | Ꚛ | ꚛ | ꚜ | ꚝ | ꚞ | ꚟ |
Notes 1.As of Unicode version 18.0

Cyrillic Extended-C^{[1]}^{[2]} Official Unicode Consortium code chart (PDF)
| | 0 | 1 | 2 | 3 | 4 | 5 | 6 | 7 | 8 | 9 | A | B | C | D | E | F |
| U+1C8x | ᲀ | ᲁ | ᲂ | ᲃ | ᲄ | ᲅ | ᲆ | ᲇ | ᲈ | Ᲊ | ᲊ | | | | | |
Notes 1.As of Unicode version 18.0 2.Grey areas indicate non-assigned code points

Cyrillic Extended-D^{[1]}^{[2]} Official Unicode Consortium code chart (PDF)
| | 0 | 1 | 2 | 3 | 4 | 5 | 6 | 7 | 8 | 9 | A | B | C | D | E | F |
| U+1E03x | 𞀰 | 𞀱 | 𞀲 | 𞀳 | 𞀴 | 𞀵 | 𞀶 | 𞀷 | 𞀸 | 𞀹 | 𞀺 | 𞀻 | 𞀼 | 𞀽 | 𞀾 | 𞀿 |
| U+1E04x | 𞁀 | 𞁁 | 𞁂 | 𞁃 | 𞁄 | 𞁅 | 𞁆 | 𞁇 | 𞁈 | 𞁉 | 𞁊 | 𞁋 | 𞁌 | 𞁍 | 𞁎 | 𞁏 |
| U+1E05x | 𞁐 | 𞁑 | 𞁒 | 𞁓 | 𞁔 | 𞁕 | 𞁖 | 𞁗 | 𞁘 | 𞁙 | 𞁚 | 𞁛 | 𞁜 | 𞁝 | 𞁞 | 𞁟 |
| U+1E06x | 𞁠 | 𞁡 | 𞁢 | 𞁣 | 𞁤 | 𞁥 | 𞁦 | 𞁧 | 𞁨 | 𞁩 | 𞁪 | 𞁫 | 𞁬 | 𞁭 | | |
| U+1E07x | | | | | | | | | | | | | | | | |
| U+1E08x | | | | | | | | | | | | | | | | ◌𞂏 |
Notes 1.As of Unicode version 18.0 2.Grey areas indicate non-assigned code points

=== Glagolitic ===
Glagolitic^{[1]} Official Unicode Consortium code chart (PDF)
| | 0 | 1 | 2 | 3 | 4 | 5 | 6 | 7 | 8 | 9 | A | B | C | D | E | F |
| U+2C0x | Ⰰ | Ⰱ | Ⰲ | Ⰳ | Ⰴ | Ⰵ | Ⰶ | Ⰷ | Ⰸ | Ⰹ | Ⰺ | Ⰻ | Ⰼ | Ⰽ | Ⰾ | Ⰿ |
| U+2C1x | Ⱀ | Ⱁ | Ⱂ | Ⱃ | Ⱄ | Ⱅ | Ⱆ | Ⱇ | Ⱈ | Ⱉ | Ⱊ | Ⱋ | Ⱌ | Ⱍ | Ⱎ | Ⱏ |
| U+2C2x | Ⱐ | Ⱑ | Ⱒ | Ⱓ | Ⱔ | Ⱕ | Ⱖ | Ⱗ | Ⱘ | Ⱙ | Ⱚ | Ⱛ | Ⱜ | Ⱝ | Ⱞ | Ⱟ |
| U+2C3x | ⰰ | ⰱ | ⰲ | ⰳ | ⰴ | ⰵ | ⰶ | ⰷ | ⰸ | ⰹ | ⰺ | ⰻ | ⰼ | ⰽ | ⰾ | ⰿ |
| U+2C4x | ⱀ | ⱁ | ⱂ | ⱃ | ⱄ | ⱅ | ⱆ | ⱇ | ⱈ | ⱉ | ⱊ | ⱋ | ⱌ | ⱍ | ⱎ | ⱏ |
| U+2C5x | ⱐ | ⱑ | ⱒ | ⱓ | ⱔ | ⱕ | ⱖ | ⱗ | ⱘ | ⱙ | ⱚ | ⱛ | ⱜ | ⱝ | ⱞ | ⱟ |
Notes 1.As of Unicode version 18.0

Glagolitic Supplement^{[1]}^{[2]} Official Unicode Consortium code chart (PDF)
| | 0 | 1 | 2 | 3 | 4 | 5 | 6 | 7 | 8 | 9 | A | B | C | D | E | F |
| U+1E00x | 𞀀 | 𞀁 | 𞀂 | 𞀃 | 𞀄 | 𞀅 | 𞀆 | | 𞀈 | 𞀉 | 𞀊 | 𞀋 | 𞀌 | 𞀍 | 𞀎 | 𞀏 |
| U+1E01x | 𞀐 | 𞀑 | 𞀒 | 𞀓 | 𞀔 | 𞀕 | 𞀖 | 𞀗 | 𞀘 | | | 𞀛 | 𞀜 | 𞀝 | 𞀞 | 𞀟 |
| U+1E02x | 𞀠 | 𞀡 | | 𞀣 | 𞀤 | | 𞀦 | 𞀧 | 𞀨 | 𞀩 | 𞀪 | | | | | |
Notes 1.As of Unicode version 18.0 2.Grey areas indicate non-assigned code points

=== Armenian ===
Armenian^{[1]}^{[2]} Official Unicode Consortium code chart (PDF)
| | 0 | 1 | 2 | 3 | 4 | 5 | 6 | 7 | 8 | 9 | A | B | C | D | E | F |
| U+053x | | Ա | Բ | Գ | Դ | Ե | Զ | Է | Ը | Թ | Ժ | Ի | Լ | Խ | Ծ | Կ |
| U+054x | Հ | Ձ | Ղ | Ճ | Մ | Յ | Ն | Շ | Ո | Չ | Պ | Ջ | Ռ | Ս | Վ | Տ |
| U+055x | Ր | Ց | Ւ | Փ | Ք | Օ | Ֆ | | ՘ | ՙ | ՚ | ՛ | ՜ | ՝ | ՞ | ՟ |
| U+056x | ՠ | ա | բ | գ | դ | ե | զ | է | ը | թ | ժ | ի | լ | խ | ծ | կ |
| U+057x | հ | ձ | ղ | ճ | մ | յ | ն | շ | ո | չ | պ | ջ | ռ | ս | վ | տ |
| U+058x | ր | ց | ւ | փ | ք | օ | ֆ | և | ֈ | ։ | ֊ | ֋ | ֌ | ֍ | ֎ | ֏ |
Notes 1.As of Unicode version 18.0 2.Grey areas indicate non-assigned code points

=== Georgian ===
Georgian^{[1]}^{[2]} Official Unicode Consortium code chart (PDF)
| | 0 | 1 | 2 | 3 | 4 | 5 | 6 | 7 | 8 | 9 | A | B | C | D | E | F |
| U+10Ax | Ⴀ | Ⴁ | Ⴂ | Ⴃ | Ⴄ | Ⴅ | Ⴆ | Ⴇ | Ⴈ | Ⴉ | Ⴊ | Ⴋ | Ⴌ | Ⴍ | Ⴎ | Ⴏ |
| U+10Bx | Ⴐ | Ⴑ | Ⴒ | Ⴓ | Ⴔ | Ⴕ | Ⴖ | Ⴗ | Ⴘ | Ⴙ | Ⴚ | Ⴛ | Ⴜ | Ⴝ | Ⴞ | Ⴟ |
| U+10Cx | Ⴠ | Ⴡ | Ⴢ | Ⴣ | Ⴤ | Ⴥ | | Ⴧ | | | | | | Ⴭ | | |
| U+10Dx | ა | ბ | გ | დ | ე | ვ | ზ | თ | ი | კ | ლ | მ | ნ | ო | პ | ჟ |
| U+10Ex | რ | ს | ტ | უ | ფ | ქ | ღ | ყ | შ | ჩ | ც | ძ | წ | ჭ | ხ | ჯ |
| U+10Fx | ჰ | ჱ | ჲ | ჳ | ჴ | ჵ | ჶ | ჷ | ჸ | ჹ | ჺ | ჻ | ჼ | ჽ | ჾ | ჿ |
Notes 1.As of Unicode version 18.0 2.Grey areas indicate non-assigned code points

=== Albanian scripts ===
- Caucasian Albanian (Unicode block)
- Elbasan (Unicode block)
- Todhri (Unicode block)
- Vithkuqi (Unicode block)

=== Ancient Anatolian Alphabets ===
- Carian (Unicode block)
- Lycian (Unicode block)
- Lydian (Unicode block)

=== Ancient scripts ===
- Linear A (Unicode block)
- Linear B Ideograms (Unicode block)
- Linear B Syllabary (Unicode block)
- Aegean Numbers (Unicode block)
- Cypriot Syllabary (Unicode block)
- Cypro-Minoan (Unicode block)
- Gothic (Unicode block)
- Ogham (Unicode block)
- Old Hungarian (Unicode block)
- Old Italic (Unicode block)
- Old Permic (Unicode block)
- Phaistos Disc (Unicode block)
- Runic (Unicode block)
- Shavian (Unicode block)
- Sidetic (Unicode block)

== Middle Eastern scripts ==
=== Hebrew ===
Hebrew^{[1]}^{[2]} Official Unicode Consortium code chart (PDF)
| | 0 | 1 | 2 | 3 | 4 | 5 | 6 | 7 | 8 | 9 | A | B | C | D | E | F |
| U+059x | | ֑ | ֒ | ֓ | ֔ | ֕ | ֖ | ֗ | ֘ | ֙ | ֚ | ֛ | ֜ | ֝ | ֞ | ֟ |
| U+05Ax | ֠ | ֡ | ֢ | ֣ | ֤ | ֥ | ֦ | ֧ | ֨ | ֩ | ֪ | ֫ | ֬ | ֭ | ֮ | ֯ |
| U+05Bx | ְ | ֱ | ֲ | ֳ | ִ | ֵ | ֶ | ַ | ָ | ֹ | ֺ | ֻ | ּ | ֽ | ־ | ֿ |
| U+05Cx | ׀ | ׁ | ׂ | ׃ | ׄ | ׅ | ׆ | ׇ | ׈ | ׉ | | | | | | |
| U+05Dx | א | ב | ג | ד | ה | ו | ז | ח | ט | י | ך | כ | ל | ם | מ | ן |
| U+05Ex | נ | ס | ע | ף | פ | ץ | צ | ק | ר | ש | ת | | | | | ׯ |
| U+05Fx | װ | ױ | ײ | ׳ | ״ | | | | | | | | | | | |
Notes 1.As of Unicode version 18.0 2.Grey areas indicate non-assigned code points

=== Arabic ===
Arabic^{[1]}^{[2]} Official Unicode Consortium code chart (PDF)
| | 0 | 1 | 2 | 3 | 4 | 5 | 6 | 7 | 8 | 9 | A | B | C | D | E | F |
| U+060x | ؀ | ؁ | ؂ | ؃ | ؄ | ؅ | ؆ | ؇ | ؈ | ؉ | ؊ | ؋ | ، | ؍ | ؎ | ؏ |
| U+061x | ؐ | ؑ | ؒ | ؓ | ؔ | ؕ | ؖ | ؗ | ؘ | ؙ | ؚ | ؛ | ALM | ؝ | ؞ | ؟ |
| U+062x | ؠ | ء | آ | أ | ؤ | إ | ئ | ا | ب | ة | ت | ث | ج | ح | خ | د |
| U+063x | ذ | ر | ز | س | ش | ص | ض | ط | ظ | ع | غ | ػ | ؼ | ؽ | ؾ | ؿ |
| U+064x | ـ | ف | ق | ك | ل | م | ن | ه | و | ى | ي | ً | ٌ | ٍ | َ | ُ |
| U+065x | ِ | ّ | ْ | ٓ | ٔ | ٕ | ٖ | ٗ | ٘ | ٙ | ٚ | ٛ | ٜ | ٝ | ٞ | ٟ |
| U+066x | ٠ | ١ | ٢ | ٣ | ٤ | ٥ | ٦ | ٧ | ٨ | ٩ | ٪ | ٫ | ٬ | ٭ | ٮ | ٯ |
| U+067x | ٰ | ٱ | ٲ | ٳ | ٴ | ٵ | ٶ | ٷ | ٸ | ٹ | ٺ | ٻ | ټ | ٽ | پ | ٿ |
| U+068x | ڀ | ځ | ڂ | ڃ | ڄ | څ | چ | ڇ | ڈ | ډ | ڊ | ڋ | ڌ | ڍ | ڎ | ڏ |
| U+069x | ڐ | ڑ | ڒ | ړ | ڔ | ڕ | ږ | ڗ | ژ | ڙ | ښ | ڛ | ڜ | ڝ | ڞ | ڟ |
| U+06Ax | ڠ | ڡ | ڢ | ڣ | ڤ | ڥ | ڦ | ڧ | ڨ | ک | ڪ | ګ | ڬ | ڭ | ڮ | گ |
| U+06Bx | ڰ | ڱ | ڲ | ڳ | ڴ | ڵ | ڶ | ڷ | ڸ | ڹ | ں | ڻ | ڼ | ڽ | ھ | ڿ |
| U+06Cx | ۀ | ہ | ۂ | ۃ | ۄ | ۅ | ۆ | ۇ | ۈ | ۉ | ۊ | ۋ | ی | ۍ | ێ | ۏ |
| U+06Dx | ې | ۑ | ے | ۓ | ۔ | ە | ۖ | ۗ | ۘ | ۙ | ۚ | ۛ | ۜ | ۝ | ۞ | ۟ |
| U+06Ex | ۠ | ۡ | ۢ | ۣ | ۤ | ۥ | ۦ | ۧ | ۨ | ۩ | ۪ | ۫۫ | ۬ | ۭ | ۮ | ۯ |
| U+06Fx | ۰ | ۱ | ۲ | ۳ | ۴ | ۵ | ۶ | ۷ | ۸ | ۹ | ۺ | ۻ | ۼ | ۽ | ۾ | ۿ |
Notes 1.As of Unicode version 18.0 2.Unicode code point U+0673 is deprecated as of Unicode version 6.0

Arabic Supplement^{[1]} Official Unicode Consortium code chart (PDF)
| | 0 | 1 | 2 | 3 | 4 | 5 | 6 | 7 | 8 | 9 | A | B | C | D | E | F |
| U+075x | ݐ | ݑ | ݒ | ݓ | ݔ | ݕ | ݖ | ݗ | ݘ | ݙ | ݚ | ݛ | ݜ | ݝ | ݞ | ݟ |
| U+076x | ݠ | ݡ | ݢ | ݣ | ݤ | ݥ | ݦ | ݧ | ݨ | ݩ | ݪ | ݫ | ݬ | ݭ | ݮ | ݯ |
| U+077x | ݰ | ݱ | ݲ | ݳ | ݴ | ݵ | ݶ | ݷ | ݸ | ݹ | ݺ | ݻ | ݼ | ݽ | ݾ | ݿ |
Notes 1.As of Unicode version 18.0

Arabic Extended-A^{[1]} Official Unicode Consortium code chart (PDF)
| | 0 | 1 | 2 | 3 | 4 | 5 | 6 | 7 | 8 | 9 | A | B | C | D | E | F |
| U+08Ax | ࢠ | ࢡ | ࢢ | ࢣ | ࢤ | ࢥ | ࢦ | ࢧ | ࢨ | ࢩ | ࢪ | ࢫ | ࢬ | ࢭ | ࢮ | ࢯ |
| U+08Bx | ࢰ | ࢱ | ࢲ | ࢳ | ࢴ | ࢵ | ࢶ | ࢷ | ࢸ | ࢹ | ࢺ | ࢻ | ࢼ | ࢽ | ࢾ | ࢿ |
| U+08Cx | ࣀ | ࣁ | ࣂ | ࣃ | ࣄ | ࣅ | ࣆ | ࣇ | ࣈ | ࣉ | ࣊ | ࣋ | ࣌ | ࣍ | ࣎ | ࣏ |
| U+08Dx | ࣐ | ࣑ | ࣒ | ࣓ | ࣔ | ࣕ | ࣖ | ࣗ | ࣘ | ࣙ | ࣚ | ࣛ | ࣜ | ࣝ | ࣞ | ࣟ |
| U+08Ex | ࣠ | ࣡ | ࣢ | ࣣ | ࣤ | ࣥ | ࣦ | ࣧ | ࣨ | ࣩ | ࣪ | ࣫ | ࣬ | ࣭ | ࣮ | ࣯ |
| U+08Fx | ࣰ | ࣱ | ࣲ | ࣳ | ࣴ | ࣵ | ࣶ | ࣷ | ࣸ | ࣹ | ࣺ | ࣻ | ࣼ | ࣽ | ࣾ | ࣿ |
Notes 1.As of Unicode version 18.0

Arabic Extended-B^{[1]}^{[2]} Official Unicode Consortium code chart (PDF)
| | 0 | 1 | 2 | 3 | 4 | 5 | 6 | 7 | 8 | 9 | A | B | C | D | E | F |
| U+087x | ࡰ | ࡱ | ࡲ | ࡳ | ࡴ | ࡵ | ࡶ | ࡷ | ࡸ | ࡹ | ࡺ | ࡻ | ࡼ | ࡽ | ࡾ | ࡿ |
| U+088x | ࢀ | ࢁ | ࢂ | ࢃ | ࢄ | ࢅ | ࢆ | ࢇ | ࢈ | ࢉ | ࢊ | ࢋ | ࢌ | ࢍ | ࢎ | ࢏ |
| U+089x | ࢐ | ࢑ | | | | | | ࢗ | ࢘ | ࢙ | ࢚ | ࢛ | ࢜ | ࢝ | ࢞ | ࢟ |
Notes 1.As of Unicode version 18.0 2.Grey areas indicate non-assigned code points

Arabic Extended-C^{[1]}^{[2]} Official Unicode Consortium code chart (PDF)
| | 0 | 1 | 2 | 3 | 4 | 5 | 6 | 7 | 8 | 9 | A | B | C | D | E | F |
| U+10ECx | | | 𐻂 | 𐻃 | 𐻄 | 𐻅 | 𐻆 | 𐻇 | | 𐻉 | 𐻊 | 𐻋 | 𐻌 | 𐻍 | 𐻎 | 𐻏 |
| U+10EDx | 𐻐 | 𐻑 | 𐻒 | 𐻓 | 𐻔 | 𐻕 | 𐻖 | 𐻗 | 𐻘 | 𐻙 | 𐻚 | 𐻛 | 𐻜 | 𐻝 | 𐻞 | 𐻟 |
| U+10EEx | 𐻠 | 𐻡 | 𐻢 | 𐻣 | 𐻤 | 𐻥 | 𐻦 | 𐻧 | 𐻨 | 𐻩 | 𐻪 | 𐻫 | 𐻬 | 𐻭 | 𐻮 | |
| U+10EFx | 𐻰 | 𐻱 | 𐻲 | 𐻳 | 𐻴 | 𐻵 | 𐻶 | 𐻷 | 𐻸 | 𐻹 | 𐻺 | 𐻻 | 𐻼 | 𐻽 | 𐻾 | 𐻿 |
Notes 1.As of Unicode version 18.0 2.Grey areas indicate non-assigned code points

- Arabic Presentation Forms-A
- Arabic Presentation Forms-B

=== Syriac ===
Syriac^{[1]}^{[2]} Official Unicode Consortium code chart (PDF)
| | 0 | 1 | 2 | 3 | 4 | 5 | 6 | 7 | 8 | 9 | A | B | C | D | E | F |
| U+070x | ܀ | ܁ | ܂ | ܃ | ܄ | ܅ | ܆ | ܇ | ܈ | ܉ | ܊ | ܋ | ܌ | ܍ | | SAM |
| U+071x | ܐ | ܑ | ܒ | ܓ | ܔ | ܕ | ܖ | ܗ | ܘ | ܙ | ܚ | ܛ | ܜ | ܝ | ܞ | ܟ |
| U+072x | ܠ | ܡ | ܢ | ܣ | ܤ | ܥ | ܦ | ܧ | ܨ | ܩ | ܪ | ܫ | ܬ | ܭ | ܮ | ܯ |
| U+073x | ܰ | ܱ | ܲ | ܳ | ܴ | ܵ | ܶ | ܷ | ܸ | ܹ | ܺ | ܻ | ܼ | ܽ | ܾ | ܿ |
| U+074x | ݀ | ݁ | ݂ | ݃ | ݄ | ݅ | ݆ | ݇ | ݈ | ݉ | ݊ | | | ݍ | ݎ | ݏ |
Notes 1.As of Unicode version 18.0 2.Grey areas indicate non-assigned code points

Syriac Supplement^{[1]}^{[2]} Official Unicode Consortium code chart (PDF)
| | 0 | 1 | 2 | 3 | 4 | 5 | 6 | 7 | 8 | 9 | A | B | C | D | E | F |
| U+086x | ࡠ | ࡡ | ࡢ | ࡣ | ࡤ | ࡥ | ࡦ | ࡧ | ࡨ | ࡩ | ࡪ | | | | | |
Notes 1.As of Unicode version 18.0 2.Grey areas indicate non-assigned code points

- Samaritan (Unicode block)
- Mandaic (Unicode block)
- Yezidi (Unicode block)

=== Ancient scripts ===
- Old North Arabian (Unicode block)
- Old South Arabian (Unicode block)
- Phoenician (Unicode block)
- Imperial Aramaic (Unicode block)
- Manichaean (Unicode block)
- Avestan (Unicode block)
- Elymaic (Unicode block)
- Chorasmian (Unicode block)
- Nabataean (Unicode block)
- Palmyrene (Unicode block)
- Hatran (Unicode block)

==== Pahlavi and Parthian scripts ====
- Inscriptional Pahlavi (Unicode block)
- Inscriptional Parthian (Unicode block)
- Psalter Pahlavi (Unicode block)

== South and Central Asian scripts ==
=== Official scripts of India ===
The range from U+0900 to U+0DFF includes Devanagari, Bengali script, Gurmukhi, Gujarati script, Odia alphabet, Tamil script, Telugu script, Kannada script, Malayalam script, and Sinhala script.

==== Devanagari ====
Devanagari^{[1]} Official Unicode Consortium code chart (PDF)
| | 0 | 1 | 2 | 3 | 4 | 5 | 6 | 7 | 8 | 9 | A | B | C | D | E | F |
| U+090x | ऀ | ँ | ं | ः | ऄ | अ | आ | इ | ई | उ | ऊ | ऋ | ऌ | ऍ | ऎ | ए |
| U+091x | ऐ | ऑ | ऒ | ओ | औ | क | ख | ग | घ | ङ | च | छ | ज | झ | ञ | ट |
| U+092x | ठ | ड | ढ | ण | त | थ | द | ध | न | ऩ | प | फ | ब | भ | म | य |
| U+093x | र | ऱ | ल | ळ | ऴ | व | श | ष | स | ह | ऺ | ऻ | ़ | ऽ | ा | ि |
| U+094x | ी | ु | ू | ृ | ॄ | ॅ | ॆ | े | ै | ॉ | ॊ | ो | ौ | ् | ॎ | ॏ |
| U+095x | ॐ | ॑ | ॒ | ॓ | ॔ | ॕ | ॖ | ॗ | क़ | ख़ | ग़ | ज़ | ड़ | ढ़ | फ़ | य़ |
| U+096x | ॠ | ॡ | ॢ | ॣ | । | ॥ | ० | १ | २ | ३ | ४ | ५ | ६ | ७ | ८ | ९ |
| U+097x | ॰ | ॱ | ॲ | ॳ | ॴ | ॵ | ॶ | ॷ | ॸ | ॹ | ॺ | ॻ | ॼ | ॽ | ॾ | ॿ |
Notes 1.As of Unicode version 18.0

Devanagari Extended^{[1]} Official Unicode Consortium code chart (PDF)
| | 0 | 1 | 2 | 3 | 4 | 5 | 6 | 7 | 8 | 9 | A | B | C | D | E | F |
| U+A8Ex | ꣠ | ꣡ | ꣢ | ꣣ | ꣤ | ꣥ | ꣦ | ꣧ | ꣨ | ꣩ | ꣪ | ꣫ | ꣬ | ꣭ | ꣮ | ꣯ |
| U+A8Fx | ꣰ | ꣱ | ꣲ | ꣳ | ꣴ | ꣵ | ꣶ | ꣷ | ꣸ | ꣹ | ꣺ | ꣻ | ꣼ | ꣽ | ꣾ | ꣿ |
Notes 1.As of Unicode version 18.0

Devanagari Extended-A^{[1]}^{[2]} Official Unicode Consortium code chart (PDF)
| | 0 | 1 | 2 | 3 | 4 | 5 | 6 | 7 | 8 | 9 | A | B | C | D | E | F |
| U+11B0x | 𑬀 | 𑬁 | 𑬂 | 𑬃 | 𑬄 | 𑬅 | 𑬆 | 𑬇 | 𑬈 | 𑬉 | 𑬊 | | | | | |
| U+11B1x | | | | | | | | | | | | | | | | |
| U+11B2x | | | | | | | | | | | | | | | | |
| U+11B3x | | | | | | | | | | | | | | | | |
| U+11B4x | | | | | | | | | | | | | | | | |
| U+11B5x | | | | | | | | | | | | | | | | |
Notes 1.As of Unicode version 18.0 2.Grey areas indicate non-assigned code points

Vedic Extensions^{[1]}^{[2]} Official Unicode Consortium code chart (PDF)
| | 0 | 1 | 2 | 3 | 4 | 5 | 6 | 7 | 8 | 9 | A | B | C | D | E | F |
| U+1CDx | ᳐ | ᳑ | ᳒ | ᳓ | ᳔ | ᳕ | ᳖ | ᳗ | ᳘ | ᳙ | ᳚ | ᳛ | ᳜ | ᳝ | ᳞ | ᳟ |
| U+1CEx | ᳠ | ᳡ | ᳢ | ᳣ | ᳤ | ᳥ | ᳦ | ᳧ | ᳨ | ᳩ | ᳪ | ᳫ | ᳬ | ᳭ | ᳮ | ᳯ |
| U+1CFx | ᳰ | ᳱ | ᳲ | ᳳ | ᳴ | ᳵ | ᳶ | ᳷ | ᳸ | ᳹ | ᳺ | | | | | |
Notes 1.As of Unicode version 18.0 2.Grey areas indicate non-assigned code points

==== Bengali and Assamese ====
Bengali^{[1]}^{[2]} Official Unicode Consortium code chart (PDF)
| | 0 | 1 | 2 | 3 | 4 | 5 | 6 | 7 | 8 | 9 | A | B | C | D | E | F |
| U+098x | ঀ | ঁ | ং | ঃ | | অ | আ | ই | ঈ | উ | ঊ | ঋ | ঌ | | | এ |
| U+099x | ঐ | | | ও | ঔ | ক | খ | গ | ঘ | ঙ | চ | ছ | জ | ঝ | ঞ | ট |
| U+09Ax | ঠ | ড | ঢ | ণ | ত | থ | দ | ধ | ন | | প | ফ | ব | ভ | ম | য |
| U+09Bx | র | | ল | | | | শ | ষ | স | হ | | | ় | ঽ | া | ি |
| U+09Cx | ী | ু | ূ | ৃ | ৄ | | | ে | ৈ | | | ো | ৌ | ্ | ৎ | |
| U+09Dx | | | | | | | | ৗ | | | | | ড় | ঢ় | | য় |
| U+09Ex | ৠ | ৡ | ৢ | ৣ | | | ০ | ১ | ২ | ৩ | ৪ | ৫ | ৬ | ৭ | ৮ | ৯ |
| U+09Fx | ৰ | ৱ | ৲ | ৳ | ৴ | ৵ | ৶ | ৷ | ৸ | ৹ | ৺ | ৻ | ৼ | ৽ | ৾ | |
Notes 1.As of Unicode version 18.0 2.Grey areas indicate non-assigned code points

Bengali Supplement^{[1]}^{[2]} Official Unicode Consortium code chart (PDF)
| | 0 | 1 | 2 | 3 | 4 | 5 | 6 | 7 | 8 | 9 | A | B | C | D | E | F |
| U+11DFx | 𑷰 | 𑷱 | | | | | | | | | | | | | | |
Notes 1.As of Unicode version 18.0 2.Grey areas indicate non-assigned code points

==== Gurmukhi ====
Gurmukhi^{[1]}^{[2]} Official Unicode Consortium code chart (PDF)
| | 0 | 1 | 2 | 3 | 4 | 5 | 6 | 7 | 8 | 9 | A | B | C | D | E | F |
| U+0A0x | | ਁ | ਂ | ਃ | | ਅ | ਆ | ਇ | ਈ | ਉ | ਊ | | | | | ਏ |
| U+0A1x | ਐ | | | ਓ | ਔ | ਕ | ਖ | ਗ | ਘ | ਙ | ਚ | ਛ | ਜ | ਝ | ਞ | ਟ |
| U+0A2x | ਠ | ਡ | ਢ | ਣ | ਤ | ਥ | ਦ | ਧ | ਨ | | ਪ | ਫ | ਬ | ਭ | ਮ | ਯ |
| U+0A3x | ਰ | | ਲ | ਲ਼ | | ਵ | ਸ਼ | | ਸ | ਹ | | | ਼ | | ਾ | ਿ |
| U+0A4x | ੀ | ੁ | ੂ | | | | | ੇ | ੈ | | | ੋ | ੌ | ੍ | | |
| U+0A5x | | ੑ | | | | | | | | ਖ਼ | ਗ਼ | ਜ਼ | ੜ | | ਫ਼ | |
| U+0A6x | | | | | | | ੦ | ੧ | ੨ | ੩ | ੪ | ੫ | ੬ | ੭ | ੮ | ੯ |
| U+0A7x | ੰ | ੱ | ੲ | ੳ | ੴ | ੵ | ੶ | | | | | | | | | |
Notes 1.As of Unicode version 18.0 2.Grey areas indicate non-assigned code points

==== Gujarati ====
Gujarati^{[1]}^{[2]} Official Unicode Consortium code chart (PDF)
| | 0 | 1 | 2 | 3 | 4 | 5 | 6 | 7 | 8 | 9 | A | B | C | D | E | F |
| U+0A8x | | ઁ | ં | ઃ | | અ | આ | ઇ | ઈ | ઉ | ઊ | ઋ | ઌ | ઍ | | એ |
| U+0A9x | ઐ | ઑ | | ઓ | ઔ | ક | ખ | ગ | ઘ | ઙ | ચ | છ | જ | ઝ | ઞ | ટ |
| U+0AAx | ઠ | ડ | ઢ | ણ | ત | થ | દ | ધ | ન | | પ | ફ | બ | ભ | મ | ય |
| U+0ABx | ર | | લ | ળ | | વ | શ | ષ | સ | હ | | | ઼ | ઽ | ા | િ |
| U+0ACx | ી | ુ | ૂ | ૃ | ૄ | ૅ | | ે | ૈ | ૉ | | ો | ૌ | ્ | | |
| U+0ADx | ૐ | | | | | | | | | | | | | | | |
| U+0AEx | ૠ | ૡ | ૢ | ૣ | | | ૦ | ૧ | ૨ | ૩ | ૪ | ૫ | ૬ | ૭ | ૮ | ૯ |
| U+0AFx | ૰ | ૱ | | | | | | | | ૹ | ૺ | ૻ | ૼ | ૽ | ૾ | ૿ |
Notes 1.As of Unicode version 18.0 2.Grey areas indicate non-assigned code points

==== Oriya ====
Oriya^{[1]}^{[2]} Official Unicode Consortium code chart (PDF)
| | 0 | 1 | 2 | 3 | 4 | 5 | 6 | 7 | 8 | 9 | A | B | C | D | E | F |
| U+0B0x | | ଁ | ଂ | ଃ | | ଅ | ଆ | ଇ | ଈ | ଉ | ଊ | ଋ | ଌ | | | ଏ |
| U+0B1x | ଐ | | | ଓ | ଔ | କ | ଖ | ଗ | ଘ | ଙ | ଚ | ଛ | ଜ | ଝ | ଞ | ଟ |
| U+0B2x | ଠ | ଡ | ଢ | ଣ | ତ | ଥ | ଦ | ଧ | ନ | | ପ | ଫ | ବ | ଭ | ମ | ଯ |
| U+0B3x | ର | | ଲ | ଳ | | ଵ | ଶ | ଷ | ସ | ହ | | | ଼ | ଽ | ା | ି |
| U+0B4x | ୀ | ୁ | ୂ | ୃ | ୄ | | | େ | ୈ | | | ୋ | ୌ | ୍ | | |
| U+0B5x | | | | ୓ | ୔ | ୕ | ୖ | ୗ | | | | | ଡ଼ | ଢ଼ | | ୟ |
| U+0B6x | ୠ | ୡ | ୢ | ୣ | | | ୦ | ୧ | ୨ | ୩ | ୪ | ୫ | ୬ | ୭ | ୮ | ୯ |
| U+0B7x | ୰ | ୱ | ୲ | ୳ | ୴ | ୵ | ୶ | ୷ | | | | | | | | |
Notes 1.As of Unicode version 18.0 2.Grey areas indicate non-assigned code points

==== Tamil ====
Tamil^{[1]}^{[2]} Official Unicode Consortium code chart (PDF)
| | 0 | 1 | 2 | 3 | 4 | 5 | 6 | 7 | 8 | 9 | A | B | C | D | E | F |
| U+0B8x | | | ஂ | ஃ | | அ | ஆ | இ | ஈ | உ | ஊ | | | | எ | ஏ |
| U+0B9x | ஐ | | ஒ | ஓ | ஔ | க | | | | ங | ச | | ஜ | | ஞ | ட |
| U+0BAx | | | | ண | த | | | | ந | ன | ப | | | | ம | ய |
| U+0BBx | ர | ற | ல | ள | ழ | வ | ஶ | ஷ | ஸ | ஹ | | | | | ா | ி |
| U+0BCx | ீ | ு | ூ | | | | ெ | ே | ை | | ொ | ோ | ௌ | ் | | |
| U+0BDx | ௐ | | | | | | | ௗ | | | | | | | | |
| U+0BEx | | | | | | | ௦ | ௧ | ௨ | ௩ | ௪ | ௫ | ௬ | ௭ | ௮ | ௯ |
| U+0BFx | ௰ | ௱ | ௲ | ௳ | ௴ | ௵ | ௶ | ௷ | ௸ | ௹ | ௺ | | | | | |
Notes 1.As of Unicode version 18.0 2.Grey areas indicate non-assigned code points

==== Telugu ====
Telugu^{[1]}^{[2]} Official Unicode Consortium code chart (PDF)
| | 0 | 1 | 2 | 3 | 4 | 5 | 6 | 7 | 8 | 9 | A | B | C | D | E | F |
| U+0C0x | ఀ | ఁ | ం | ః | ఄ | అ | ఆ | ఇ | ఈ | ఉ | ఊ | ఋ | ఌ | | ఎ | ఏ |
| U+0C1x | ఐ | | ఒ | ఓ | ఔ | క | ఖ | గ | ఘ | ఙ | చ | ఛ | జ | ఝ | ఞ | ట |
| U+0C2x | ఠ | డ | ఢ | ణ | త | థ | ద | ధ | న | | ప | ఫ | బ | భ | మ | య |
| U+0C3x | ర | ఱ | ల | ళ | ఴ | వ | శ | ష | స | హ | | | ఼ | ఽ | ా | ి |
| U+0C4x | ీ | ు | ూ | ృ | ౄ | | ె | ే | ై | | ొ | ో | ౌ | ్ | | |
| U+0C5x | | | | | | ౕ | ౖ | | ౘ | ౙ | ౚ | | ౜ | ౝ | | |
| U+0C6x | ౠ | ౡ | ౢ | ౣ | | | ౦ | ౧ | ౨ | ౩ | ౪ | ౫ | ౬ | ౭ | ౮ | ౯ |
| U+0C7x | | | | | | | | ౷ | ౸ | ౹ | ౺ | ౻ | ౼ | ౽ | ౾ | ౿ |
Notes 1.As of Unicode version 18.0 2.Grey areas indicate non-assigned code points

==== Kannada ====
Kannada^{[1]}^{[2]} Official Unicode Consortium code chart (PDF)
| | 0 | 1 | 2 | 3 | 4 | 5 | 6 | 7 | 8 | 9 | A | B | C | D | E | F |
| U+0C8x | ಀ | ಁ | ಂ | ಃ | ಄ | ಅ | ಆ | ಇ | ಈ | ಉ | ಊ | ಋ | ಌ | | ಎ | ಏ |
| U+0C9x | ಐ | | ಒ | ಓ | ಔ | ಕ | ಖ | ಗ | ಘ | ಙ | ಚ | ಛ | ಜ | ಝ | ಞ | ಟ |
| U+0CAx | ಠ | ಡ | ಢ | ಣ | ತ | ಥ | ದ | ಧ | ನ | | ಪ | ಫ | ಬ | ಭ | ಮ | ಯ |
| U+0CBx | ರ | ಱ | ಲ | ಳ | | ವ | ಶ | ಷ | ಸ | ಹ | | | ಼ | ಽ | ಾ | ಿ |
| U+0CCx | ೀ | ು | ೂ | ೃ | ೄ | | ೆ | ೇ | ೈ | | ೊ | ೋ | ೌ | ್ | | |
| U+0CDx | | | | | | ೕ | ೖ | | | | | | ೜ | ೝ | ೞ | |
| U+0CEx | ೠ | ೡ | ೢ | ೣ | | | ೦ | ೧ | ೨ | ೩ | ೪ | ೫ | ೬ | ೭ | ೮ | ೯ |
| U+0CFx | | ೱ | ೲ | ೳ | | | | | | | | | | | | |
Notes 1.As of Unicode version 18.0 2.Grey areas indicate non-assigned code points

==== Malayalam ====
Malayalam^{[1]}^{[2]} Official Unicode Consortium code chart (PDF)
| | 0 | 1 | 2 | 3 | 4 | 5 | 6 | 7 | 8 | 9 | A | B | C | D | E | F |
| U+0D0x | ഀ | ഁ | ം | ഃ | ഄ | അ | ആ | ഇ | ഈ | ഉ | ഊ | ഋ | ഌ | | എ | ഏ |
| U+0D1x | ഐ | | ഒ | ഓ | ഔ | ക | ഖ | ഗ | ഘ | ങ | ച | ഛ | ജ | ഝ | ഞ | ട |
| U+0D2x | ഠ | ഡ | ഢ | ണ | ത | ഥ | ദ | ധ | ന | ഩ | പ | ഫ | ബ | ഭ | മ | യ |
| U+0D3x | ര | റ | ല | ള | ഴ | വ | ശ | ഷ | സ | ഹ | ഺ | ഻ | ഼ | ഽ | ാ | ി |
| U+0D4x | ീ | ു | ൂ | ൃ | ൄ | | െ | േ | ൈ | | ൊ | ോ | ൌ | ് | ൎ | ൏ |
| U+0D5x | | | | | ൔ | ൕ | ൖ | ൗ | ൘ | ൙ | ൚ | ൛ | ൜ | ൝ | ൞ | ൟ |
| U+0D6x | ൠ | ൡ | ൢ | ൣ | | | ൦ | ൧ | ൨ | ൩ | ൪ | ൫ | ൬ | ൭ | ൮ | ൯ |
| U+0D7x | ൰ | ൱ | ൲ | ൳ | ൴ | ൵ | ൶ | ൷ | ൸ | ൹ | ൺ | ൻ | ർ | ൽ | ൾ | ൿ |
Notes 1.As of Unicode version 18.0 2.Grey areas indicate non-assigned code points

=== Other Modern Scripts ===
==== Thaana ====
Thaana^{[1]}^{[2]} Official Unicode Consortium code chart (PDF)
| | 0 | 1 | 2 | 3 | 4 | 5 | 6 | 7 | 8 | 9 | A | B | C | D | E | F |
| U+078x | ހ | ށ | ނ | ރ | ބ | ޅ | ކ | އ | ވ | މ | ފ | ދ | ތ | ލ | ގ | ޏ |
| U+079x | ސ | ޑ | ޒ | ޓ | ޔ | ޕ | ޖ | ޗ | ޘ | ޙ | ޚ | ޛ | ޜ | ޝ | ޞ | ޟ |
| U+07Ax | ޠ | ޡ | ޢ | ޣ | ޤ | ޥ | ަ | ާ | ި | ީ | ު | ޫ | ެ | ޭ | ޮ | ޯ |
| U+07Bx | ް | ޱ | | | | | | | | | | | | | | |
Notes 1.As of Unicode version 18.0 2.Grey areas indicate non-assigned code points

==== Sinhala ====
Sinhala^{[1]}^{[2]} Official Unicode Consortium code chart (PDF)
| | 0 | 1 | 2 | 3 | 4 | 5 | 6 | 7 | 8 | 9 | A | B | C | D | E | F |
| U+0D8x | | ඁ | ං | ඃ | | අ | ආ | ඇ | ඈ | ඉ | ඊ | උ | ඌ | ඍ | ඎ | ඏ |
| U+0D9x | ඐ | එ | ඒ | ඓ | ඔ | ඕ | ඖ | | | | ක | ඛ | ග | ඝ | ඞ | ඟ |
| U+0DAx | ච | ඡ | ජ | ඣ | ඤ | ඥ | ඦ | ට | ඨ | ඩ | ඪ | ණ | ඬ | ත | ථ | ද |
| U+0DBx | ධ | න | | ඳ | ප | ඵ | බ | භ | ම | ඹ | ය | ර | | ල | | |
| U+0DCx | ව | ශ | ෂ | ස | හ | ළ | ෆ | | | | ් | | | | | ා |
| U+0DDx | ැ | ෑ | ි | ී | ු | | ූ | | ෘ | ෙ | ේ | ෛ | ො | ෝ | ෞ | ෟ |
| U+0DEx | | | | | | | ෦ | ෧ | ෨ | ෩ | ෪ | ෫ | ෬ | ෭ | ෮ | ෯ |
| U+0DFx | | | ෲ | ෳ | ෴ | | | | | | | | | | | |
Notes 1.As of Unicode version 18.0 2.Grey areas indicate non-assigned code points

Sinhala Archaic Numbers^{[1]}^{[2]} Official Unicode Consortium code chart (PDF)
| | 0 | 1 | 2 | 3 | 4 | 5 | 6 | 7 | 8 | 9 | A | B | C | D | E | F |
| U+111Ex | | 𑇡 | 𑇢 | 𑇣 | 𑇤 | 𑇥 | 𑇦 | 𑇧 | 𑇨 | 𑇩 | 𑇪 | 𑇫 | 𑇬 | 𑇭 | 𑇮 | 𑇯 |
| U+111Fx | 𑇰 | 𑇱 | 𑇲 | 𑇳 | 𑇴 | | | | | | | | | | | |
Notes 1.As of Unicode version 18.0 2.Grey areas indicate non-assigned code points

==== Mongolian ====
Mongolian^{[1]}^{[2]}^{[3]} Official Unicode Consortium code chart (PDF)
| | 0 | 1 | 2 | 3 | 4 | 5 | 6 | 7 | 8 | 9 | A | B | C | D | E | F |
| U+180x | ᠀ | ᠁ | ᠂ | ᠃ | ᠄ | ᠅ | ᠆ | ᠇ | ᠈ | ᠉ | ᠊ | FVS; 1 | FVS; 2 | FVS; 3 | MVS | FVS; 4 |
| U+181x | ᠐ | ᠑ | ᠒ | ᠓ | ᠔ | ᠕ | ᠖ | ᠗ | ᠘ | ᠙ | | | | | | |
| U+182x | ᠠ | ᠡ | ᠢ | ᠣ | ᠤ | ᠥ | ᠦ | ᠧ | ᠨ | ᠩ | ᠪ | ᠫ | ᠬ | ᠭ | ᠮ | ᠯ |
| U+183x | ᠰ | ᠱ | ᠲ | ᠳ | ᠴ | ᠵ | ᠶ | ᠷ | ᠸ | ᠹ | ᠺ | ᠻ | ᠼ | ᠽ | ᠾ | ᠿ |
| U+184x | ᡀ | ᡁ | ᡂ | ᡃ | ᡄ | ᡅ | ᡆ | ᡇ | ᡈ | ᡉ | ᡊ | ᡋ | ᡌ | ᡍ | ᡎ | ᡏ |
| U+185x | ᡐ | ᡑ | ᡒ | ᡓ | ᡔ | ᡕ | ᡖ | ᡗ | ᡘ | ᡙ | ᡚ | ᡛ | ᡜ | ᡝ | ᡞ | ᡟ |
| U+186x | ᡠ | ᡡ | ᡢ | ᡣ | ᡤ | ᡥ | ᡦ | ᡧ | ᡨ | ᡩ | ᡪ | ᡫ | ᡬ | ᡭ | ᡮ | ᡯ |
| U+187x | ᡰ | ᡱ | ᡲ | ᡳ | ᡴ | ᡵ | ᡶ | ᡷ | ᡸ | | | | | | | |
| U+188x | ᢀ | ᢁ | ᢂ | ᢃ | ᢄ | ᢅ | ᢆ | ᢇ | ᢈ | ᢉ | ᢊ | ᢋ | ᢌ | ᢍ | ᢎ | ᢏ |
| U+189x | ᢐ | ᢑ | ᢒ | ᢓ | ᢔ | ᢕ | ᢖ | ᢗ | ᢘ | ᢙ | ᢚ | ᢛ | ᢜ | ᢝ | ᢞ | ᢟ |
| U+18Ax | ᢠ | ᢡ | ᢢ | ᢣ | ᢤ | ᢥ | ᢦ | ᢧ | ᢨ | ᢩ | ᢪ | | | | | |
Notes 1.As of Unicode version 18.0 2.Grey areas indicate non-assigned code points 3.The Unicode presentation form of U+1824 MONGOLIAN LETTER U is U+1824 FVS1 ᠤ᠋ Second Isolate Form, to distinguish it from the visually identical U+1823 MONGOLIAN LETTER O. For the same reason, the Unicode presentation form of U+1826 MONGOLIAN LETTER UE is U+1826 FVS2 ᠦ᠌ Third Isolate Form. See document N4752R2.

==== Other scripts ====
- Common Indic Number Forms (Unicode block)
- Newa (Unicode block)
- Tibetan (Unicode block)
- Limbu (Unicode block)
- Meetei Mayek (Unicode block)
- Meetei Mayek Extensions (Unicode block)
- Mro (Unicode block)
- Ol Chiki (Unicode block)
- Ol Onal (Unicode block)
- Gunjala Gondi (Unicode block)
- Masaram Gondi (Unicode block)
- Nag Mundari (Unicode block)
- Sora Sompeng (Unicode block)
- Sunuwar (Unicode block)
- Tangsa (Unicode block)
- Tolong Siki (Unicode block)
- Toto (Unicode block)
- Warang Citi (Unicode block)

=== Ancient Scripts ===
- Brahmi (Unicode block)
- Ahom (Unicode block)
- Chakma (Unicode block)
- Dives Akuru (Unicode block)
- Dogra (Unicode block)
- Grantha (Unicode block)
- Gurung Khema (Unicode block)
- Kaithi (Unicode block)
- Khojki (Unicode block)
- Khudawadi (Unicode block)
- Kirat Rai (Unicode block)
- Lepcha (Unicode block)
- Mahajani (Unicode block)
- Makasar (Unicode block)
- Modi (Unicode block)
- Multani (Unicode block)
- Saurashtra (Unicode block)
- Sharada (Unicode block)
- Sharada Supplement (Unicode block)
- Siddham (Unicode block)
- Sundanese (Unicode block)
- Sundanese Supplement (Unicode block)
- Syloti Nagri (Unicode block)
- Takri (Unicode block)
- Tirhuta (Unicode block)
- Tulu-Tigalari (Unicode block)
- Nandinagari (Unicode block)

==== Tibetan scripts ====
- Marchen (Unicode block)
- Phags-pa (Unicode block)
- Soyombo (Unicode block)
- Zanabazar Square (Unicode block)

==== Non-Brahmic scripts ====
- Kharoshthi (Unicode block)
- Bhaiksuki (Unicode block)
- Sogdian (Unicode block)
- Old Sogdian (Unicode block)
- Old Turkic (Unicode block)
- Old Uyghur (Unicode block)

== Southeast Asian scripts ==
=== Thai ===
Thai^{[1]}^{[2]} Official Unicode Consortium code chart (PDF)
| | 0 | 1 | 2 | 3 | 4 | 5 | 6 | 7 | 8 | 9 | A | B | C | D | E | F |
| U+0E0x | | ก | ข | ฃ | ค | ฅ | ฆ | ง | จ | ฉ | ช | ซ | ฌ | ญ | ฎ | ฏ |
| U+0E1x | ฐ | ฑ | ฒ | ณ | ด | ต | ถ | ท | ธ | น | บ | ป | ผ | ฝ | พ | ฟ |
| U+0E2x | ภ | ม | ย | ร | ฤ | ล | ฦ | ว | ศ | ษ | ส | ห | ฬ | อ | ฮ | ฯ |
| U+0E3x | ะ | ั | า | ำ | ิ | ี | ึ | ื | ุ | ู | ฺ | | | | | ฿ |
| U+0E4x | เ | แ | โ | ใ | ไ | ๅ | ๆ | ็ | ่ | ้ | ๊ | ๋ | ์ | ํ | ๎ | ๏ |
| U+0E5x | ๐ | ๑ | ๒ | ๓ | ๔ | ๕ | ๖ | ๗ | ๘ | ๙ | ๚ | ๛ | | | | |
| U+0E6x | | | | | | | | | | | | | | | | |
| U+0E7x | | | | | | | | | | | | | | | | |
Notes 1.As of Unicode version 18.0 2.Grey areas indicate non-assigned code points

=== Lao ===
Lao^{[1]}^{[2]} Official Unicode Consortium code chart (PDF)
| | 0 | 1 | 2 | 3 | 4 | 5 | 6 | 7 | 8 | 9 | A | B | C | D | E | F |
| U+0E8x | | ກ | ຂ | | ຄ | | ຆ | ງ | ຈ | ຉ | ຊ | | ຌ | ຍ | ຎ | ຏ |
| U+0E9x | ຐ | ຑ | ຒ | ຓ | ດ | ຕ | ຖ | ທ | ຘ | ນ | ບ | ປ | ຜ | ຝ | ພ | ຟ |
| U+0EAx | ຠ | ມ | ຢ | ຣ | | ລ | | ວ | ຨ | ຩ | ສ | ຫ | ຬ | ອ | ຮ | ຯ |
| U+0EBx | ະ | ັ | າ | ຳ | ິ | ີ | ຶ | ື | ຸ | ູ | ຺ | ົ | ຼ | ຽ | | |
| U+0ECx | ເ | ແ | ໂ | ໃ | ໄ | | ໆ | | ່ | ້ | ໊ | ໋ | ໌ | ໍ | ໎ | |
| U+0EDx | ໐ | ໑ | ໒ | ໓ | ໔ | ໕ | ໖ | ໗ | ໘ | ໙ | | | ໜ | ໝ | ໞ | ໟ |
| U+0EEx | | | | | | | | | | | | | | | | |
| U+0EFx | | | | | | | | | | | | | | | | |
Notes 1.As of Unicode version 18.0 2.Grey areas indicate non-assigned code points

=== Myanmar ===
Myanmar^{[1]} Official Unicode Consortium code chart (PDF)
| | 0 | 1 | 2 | 3 | 4 | 5 | 6 | 7 | 8 | 9 | A | B | C | D | E | F |
| U+100x | က | ခ | ဂ | ဃ | င | စ | ဆ | ဇ | ဈ | ဉ | ည | ဋ | ဌ | ဍ | ဎ | ဏ |
| U+101x | တ | ထ | ဒ | ဓ | န | ပ | ဖ | ဗ | ဘ | မ | ယ | ရ | လ | ဝ | သ | ဟ |
| U+102x | ဠ | အ | ဢ | ဣ | ဤ | ဥ | ဦ | ဧ | ဨ | ဩ | ဪ | ါ | ာ | ိ | ီ | ု |
| U+103x | ူ | ေ | ဲ | ဳ | ဴ | ဵ | ံ | ့ | း | ္ | ် | ျ | ြ | ွ | ှ | ဿ |
| U+104x | ၀ | ၁ | ၂ | ၃ | ၄ | ၅ | ၆ | ၇ | ၈ | ၉ | ၊ | ။ | ၌ | ၍ | ၎ | ၏ |
| U+105x | ၐ | ၑ | ၒ | ၓ | ၔ | ၕ | ၖ | ၗ | ၘ | ၙ | ၚ | ၛ | ၜ | ၝ | ၞ | ၟ |
| U+106x | ၠ | ၡ | ၢ | ၣ | ၤ | ၥ | ၦ | ၧ | ၨ | ၩ | ၪ | ၫ | ၬ | ၭ | ၮ | ၯ |
| U+107x | ၰ | ၱ | ၲ | ၳ | ၴ | ၵ | ၶ | ၷ | ၸ | ၹ | ၺ | ၻ | ၼ | ၽ | ၾ | ၿ |
| U+108x | ႀ | ႁ | ႂ | ႃ | ႄ | ႅ | ႆ | ႇ | ႈ | ႉ | ႊ | ႋ | ႌ | ႍ | ႎ | ႏ |
| U+109x | ႐ | ႑ | ႒ | ႓ | ႔ | ႕ | ႖ | ႗ | ႘ | ႙ | ႚ | ႛ | ႜ | ႝ | ႞ | ႟ |
Notes 1.As of Unicode version 18.0

Myanmar Extended-A^{[1]} Official Unicode Consortium code chart (PDF)
| | 0 | 1 | 2 | 3 | 4 | 5 | 6 | 7 | 8 | 9 | A | B | C | D | E | F |
| U+AA6x | ꩠ | ꩡ | ꩢ | ꩣ | ꩤ | ꩥ | ꩦ | ꩧ | ꩨ | ꩩ | ꩪ | ꩫ | ꩬ | ꩭ | ꩮ | ꩯ |
| U+AA7x | ꩰ | ꩱ | ꩲ | ꩳ | ꩴ | ꩵ | ꩶ | ꩷ | ꩸ | ꩹ | ꩺ | ꩻ | ꩼ | ꩽ | ꩾ | ꩿ |
Notes 1.As of Unicode version 18.0

Myanmar Extended-B^{[1]}^{[2]} Official Unicode Consortium code chart (PDF)
| | 0 | 1 | 2 | 3 | 4 | 5 | 6 | 7 | 8 | 9 | A | B | C | D | E | F |
| U+A9Ex | ꧠ | ꧡ | ꧢ | ꧣ | ꧤ | ꧥ | ꧦ | ꧧ | ꧨ | ꧩ | ꧪ | ꧫ | ꧬ | ꧭ | ꧮ | ꧯ |
| U+A9Fx | ꧰ | ꧱ | ꧲ | ꧳ | ꧴ | ꧵ | ꧶ | ꧷ | ꧸ | ꧹ | ꧺ | ꧻ | ꧼ | ꧽ | ꧾ | |
Notes 1.As of Unicode version 18.0 2.Grey area indicates non-assigned code point

Myanmar Extended-C^{[1]}^{[2]} Official Unicode Consortium code chart (PDF)
| | 0 | 1 | 2 | 3 | 4 | 5 | 6 | 7 | 8 | 9 | A | B | C | D | E | F |
| U+116Dx | 𑛐 | 𑛑 | 𑛒 | 𑛓 | 𑛔 | 𑛕 | 𑛖 | 𑛗 | 𑛘 | 𑛙 | 𑛚 | 𑛛 | 𑛜 | 𑛝 | 𑛞 | 𑛟 |
| U+116Ex | 𑛠 | 𑛡 | 𑛢 | 𑛣 | | | | | | | | | | | | |
| U+116Fx | | | | | | | | | | | | | | | | |
Notes 1.As of Unicode version 18.0 2.Grey areas indicate non-assigned code points

=== Khmer ===
Khmer^{[1]}^{[2]}^{[3]} Official Unicode Consortium code chart (PDF)
| | 0 | 1 | 2 | 3 | 4 | 5 | 6 | 7 | 8 | 9 | A | B | C | D | E | F |
| U+178x | ក | ខ | គ | ឃ | ង | ច | ឆ | ជ | ឈ | ញ | ដ | ឋ | ឌ | ឍ | ណ | ត |
| U+179x | ថ | ទ | ធ | ន | ប | ផ | ព | ភ | ម | យ | រ | ល | វ | ឝ | ឞ | ស |
| U+17Ax | ហ | ឡ | អ | ឣ | ឤ | ឥ | ឦ | ឧ | ឨ | ឩ | ឪ | ឫ | ឬ | ឭ | ឮ | ឯ |
| U+17Bx | ឰ | ឱ | ឲ | ឳ | KIV; AQ | KIV; AA | ា | ិ | ី | ឹ | ឺ | ុ | ូ | ួ | ើ | ឿ |
| U+17Cx | ៀ | េ | ែ | ៃ | ោ | ៅ | ំ | ះ | ៈ | ៉ | ៊ | ់ | ៌ | ៍ | ៎ | ៏ |
| U+17Dx | ័ | ៑ | ្ | ៓ | ។ | ៕ | ៖ | ៗ | ៘ | ៙ | ៚ | ៛ | ៜ | ៝ | | |
| U+17Ex | ០ | ១ | ២ | ៣ | ៤ | ៥ | ៦ | ៧ | ៨ | ៩ | | | | | | |
| U+17Fx | ៰ | ៱ | ៲ | ៳ | ៴ | ៵ | ៶ | ៷ | ៸ | ៹ | | | | | | |
Notes 1.As of Unicode version 18.0 2.Grey areas indicate non-assigned code points 3.U+17A3 and U+17A4 are deprecated as of Unicode versions 4.0 and 5.2 respectively

Khmer Symbols^{[1]} Official Unicode Consortium code chart (PDF)
| | 0 | 1 | 2 | 3 | 4 | 5 | 6 | 7 | 8 | 9 | A | B | C | D | E | F |
| U+19Ex | ᧠ | ᧡ | ᧢ | ᧣ | ᧤ | ᧥ | ᧦ | ᧧ | ᧨ | ᧩ | ᧪ | ᧫ | ᧬ | ᧭ | ᧮ | ᧯ |
| U+19Fx | ᧰ | ᧱ | ᧲ | ᧳ | ᧴ | ᧵ | ᧶ | ᧷ | ᧸ | ᧹ | ᧺ | ᧻ | ᧼ | ᧽ | ᧾ | ᧿ |
Notes 1.As of Unicode version 18.0

=== Tai scripts ===
- Tai Le (Unicode block)
- New Tai Lue (Unicode block)
- Tai Tham (Unicode block)
- Tai Viet (Unicode block)
- Tai Yo (Unicode block)

=== Hmong scripts ===
- Pahawh Hmong (Unicode block)
- Nyiakeng Puachue Hmong (Unicode block)

=== Other mainland scripts ===
- Cham (Unicode block)
- Hanifi Rohingya (Unicode block)
- Kayah Li (Unicode block)
- Pau Cin Hau (Unicode block)

=== Philippine Scripts ===
- Tagalog (Unicode block)
- Hanunoo (Unicode block)
- Buhid (Unicode block)
- Tagbanwa (Unicode block)

=== Indonesian scripts ===
- Buginese (Unicode block)
- Balinese (Unicode block)
- Javanese (Unicode block)
- Rejang (Unicode block)
- Batak (Unicode block)
- Sundanese (Unicode block)
- Makasar (Unicode block)
- Kawi (Unicode block)

== East Asian scripts ==
=== Han ===
==== CJK Unified Ideographs ====
- CJK Unified Ideographs
- CJK Unified Ideographs Extension A
- CJK Unified Ideographs Extension B
- CJK Unified Ideographs Extension C
- CJK Unified Ideographs Extension D
- CJK Unified Ideographs Extension E
- CJK Unified Ideographs Extension F
- CJK Unified Ideographs Extension G
- CJK Unified Ideographs Extension H
- CJK Unified Ideographs Extension I
- CJK Unified Ideographs Extension J
- CJK Compatibility Ideographs
- CJK Compatibility Ideographs Supplement

==== CJK Symbols and Punctuation ====
CJK Symbols and Punctuation^{[1]} Official Unicode Consortium code chart (PDF)
| | 0 | 1 | 2 | 3 | 4 | 5 | 6 | 7 | 8 | 9 | A | B | C | D | E | F |
| U+300x | ID; SP | 、 | 。 | 〃 | 〄 | 々 | 〆 | 〇 | 〈 | 〉 | 《 | 》 | 「 | 」 | 『 | 』 |
| U+301x | 【 | 】 | 〒 | 〓 | 〔 | 〕 | 〖 | 〗 | 〘 | 〙 | 〚 | 〛 | 〜 | 〝 | 〞 | 〟 |
| U+302x | 〠 | 〡 | 〢 | 〣 | 〤 | 〥 | 〦 | 〧 | 〨 | 〩 | 〪 | 〫 | 〬 | 〭 | 〮 | 〯 |
| U+303x | 〰 | 〱 | 〲 | 〳 | 〴 | 〵 | 〶 | 〷 | 〸 | 〹 | 〺 | 〻 | 〼 | 〽 | 〾 | 〿 |
Notes 1.As of Unicode version 18.0

==== Kanbun ====
Kanbun^{[1]} Official Unicode Consortium code chart (PDF)
| | 0 | 1 | 2 | 3 | 4 | 5 | 6 | 7 | 8 | 9 | A | B | C | D | E | F |
| U+319x | ㆐ | ㆑ | ㆒ | ㆓ | ㆔ | ㆕ | ㆖ | ㆗ | ㆘ | ㆙ | ㆚ | ㆛ | ㆜ | ㆝ | ㆞ | ㆟ |
Notes 1.As of Unicode version 18.0

==== Enclosed CJK Letters and Months ====
Enclosed CJK Letters and Months^{[1]}^{[2]} Official Unicode Consortium code chart (PDF)
| | 0 | 1 | 2 | 3 | 4 | 5 | 6 | 7 | 8 | 9 | A | B | C | D | E | F |
| U+320x | ㈀ | ㈁ | ㈂ | ㈃ | ㈄ | ㈅ | ㈆ | ㈇ | ㈈ | ㈉ | ㈊ | ㈋ | ㈌ | ㈍ | ㈎ | ㈏ |
| U+321x | ㈐ | ㈑ | ㈒ | ㈓ | ㈔ | ㈕ | ㈖ | ㈗ | ㈘ | ㈙ | ㈚ | ㈛ | ㈜ | ㈝ | ㈞ | |
| U+322x | ㈠ | ㈡ | ㈢ | ㈣ | ㈤ | ㈥ | ㈦ | ㈧ | ㈨ | ㈩ | ㈪ | ㈫ | ㈬ | ㈭ | ㈮ | ㈯ |
| U+323x | ㈰ | ㈱ | ㈲ | ㈳ | ㈴ | ㈵ | ㈶ | ㈷ | ㈸ | ㈹ | ㈺ | ㈻ | ㈼ | ㈽ | ㈾ | ㈿ |
| U+324x | ㉀ | ㉁ | ㉂ | ㉃ | ㉄ | ㉅ | ㉆ | ㉇ | ㉈ | ㉉ | ㉊ | ㉋ | ㉌ | ㉍ | ㉎ | ㉏ |
| U+325x | ㉐ | ㉑ | ㉒ | ㉓ | ㉔ | ㉕ | ㉖ | ㉗ | ㉘ | ㉙ | ㉚ | ㉛ | ㉜ | ㉝ | ㉞ | ㉟ |
| U+326x | ㉠ | ㉡ | ㉢ | ㉣ | ㉤ | ㉥ | ㉦ | ㉧ | ㉨ | ㉩ | ㉪ | ㉫ | ㉬ | ㉭ | ㉮ | ㉯ |
| U+327x | ㉰ | ㉱ | ㉲ | ㉳ | ㉴ | ㉵ | ㉶ | ㉷ | ㉸ | ㉹ | ㉺ | ㉻ | ㉼ | ㉽ | ㉾ | ㉿ |
| U+328x | ㊀ | ㊁ | ㊂ | ㊃ | ㊄ | ㊅ | ㊆ | ㊇ | ㊈ | ㊉ | ㊊ | ㊋ | ㊌ | ㊍ | ㊎ | ㊏ |
| U+329x | ㊐ | ㊑ | ㊒ | ㊓ | ㊔ | ㊕ | ㊖ | ㊗ | ㊘ | ㊙ | ㊚ | ㊛ | ㊜ | ㊝ | ㊞ | ㊟ |
| U+32Ax | ㊠ | ㊡ | ㊢ | ㊣ | ㊤ | ㊥ | ㊦ | ㊧ | ㊨ | ㊩ | ㊪ | ㊫ | ㊬ | ㊭ | ㊮ | ㊯ |
| U+32Bx | ㊰ | ㊱ | ㊲ | ㊳ | ㊴ | ㊵ | ㊶ | ㊷ | ㊸ | ㊹ | ㊺ | ㊻ | ㊼ | ㊽ | ㊾ | ㊿ |
| U+32Cx | ㋀ | ㋁ | ㋂ | ㋃ | ㋄ | ㋅ | ㋆ | ㋇ | ㋈ | ㋉ | ㋊ | ㋋ | ㋌ | ㋍ | ㋎ | ㋏ |
| U+32Dx | ㋐ | ㋑ | ㋒ | ㋓ | ㋔ | ㋕ | ㋖ | ㋗ | ㋘ | ㋙ | ㋚ | ㋛ | ㋜ | ㋝ | ㋞ | ㋟ |
| U+32Ex | ㋠ | ㋡ | ㋢ | ㋣ | ㋤ | ㋥ | ㋦ | ㋧ | ㋨ | ㋩ | ㋪ | ㋫ | ㋬ | ㋭ | ㋮ | ㋯ |
| U+32Fx | ㋰ | ㋱ | ㋲ | ㋳ | ㋴ | ㋵ | ㋶ | ㋷ | ㋸ | ㋹ | ㋺ | ㋻ | ㋼ | ㋽ | ㋾ | ㋿ |
Notes 1.As of Unicode version 18.0 2.Grey area indicates non-assigned code point

==== CJK Compatibility ====
CJK Compatibility^{[1]} Official Unicode Consortium code chart (PDF)
| | 0 | 1 | 2 | 3 | 4 | 5 | 6 | 7 | 8 | 9 | A | B | C | D | E | F |
| U+330x | ㌀ | ㌁ | ㌂ | ㌃ | ㌄ | ㌅ | ㌆ | ㌇ | ㌈ | ㌉ | ㌊ | ㌋ | ㌌ | ㌍ | ㌎ | ㌏ |
| U+331x | ㌐ | ㌑ | ㌒ | ㌓ | ㌔ | ㌕ | ㌖ | ㌗ | ㌘ | ㌙ | ㌚ | ㌛ | ㌜ | ㌝ | ㌞ | ㌟ |
| U+332x | ㌠ | ㌡ | ㌢ | ㌣ | ㌤ | ㌥ | ㌦ | ㌧ | ㌨ | ㌩ | ㌪ | ㌫ | ㌬ | ㌭ | ㌮ | ㌯ |
| U+333x | ㌰ | ㌱ | ㌲ | ㌳ | ㌴ | ㌵ | ㌶ | ㌷ | ㌸ | ㌹ | ㌺ | ㌻ | ㌼ | ㌽ | ㌾ | ㌿ |
| U+334x | ㍀ | ㍁ | ㍂ | ㍃ | ㍄ | ㍅ | ㍆ | ㍇ | ㍈ | ㍉ | ㍊ | ㍋ | ㍌ | ㍍ | ㍎ | ㍏ |
| U+335x | ㍐ | ㍑ | ㍒ | ㍓ | ㍔ | ㍕ | ㍖ | ㍗ | ㍘ | ㍙ | ㍚ | ㍛ | ㍜ | ㍝ | ㍞ | ㍟ |
| U+336x | ㍠ | ㍡ | ㍢ | ㍣ | ㍤ | ㍥ | ㍦ | ㍧ | ㍨ | ㍩ | ㍪ | ㍫ | ㍬ | ㍭ | ㍮ | ㍯ |
| U+337x | ㍰ | ㍱ | ㍲ | ㍳ | ㍴ | ㍵ | ㍶ | ㍷ | ㍸ | ㍹ | ㍺ | ㍻ | ㍼ | ㍽ | ㍾ | ㍿ |
| U+338x | ㎀ | ㎁ | ㎂ | ㎃ | ㎄ | ㎅ | ㎆ | ㎇ | ㎈ | ㎉ | ㎊ | ㎋ | ㎌ | ㎍ | ㎎ | ㎏ |
| U+339x | ㎐ | ㎑ | ㎒ | ㎓ | ㎔ | ㎕ | ㎖ | ㎗ | ㎘ | ㎙ | ㎚ | ㎛ | ㎜ | ㎝ | ㎞ | ㎟ |
| U+33Ax | ㎠ | ㎡ | ㎢ | ㎣ | ㎤ | ㎥ | ㎦ | ㎧ | ㎨ | ㎩ | ㎪ | ㎫ | ㎬ | ㎭ | ㎮ | ㎯ |
| U+33Bx | ㎰ | ㎱ | ㎲ | ㎳ | ㎴ | ㎵ | ㎶ | ㎷ | ㎸ | ㎹ | ㎺ | ㎻ | ㎼ | ㎽ | ㎾ | ㎿ |
| U+33Cx | ㏀ | ㏁ | ㏂ | ㏃ | ㏄ | ㏅ | ㏆ | ㏇ | ㏈ | ㏉ | ㏊ | ㏋ | ㏌ | ㏍ | ㏎ | ㏏ |
| U+33Dx | ㏐ | ㏑ | ㏒ | ㏓ | ㏔ | ㏕ | ㏖ | ㏗ | ㏘ | ㏙ | ㏚ | ㏛ | ㏜ | ㏝ | ㏞ | ㏟ |
| U+33Ex | ㏠ | ㏡ | ㏢ | ㏣ | ㏤ | ㏥ | ㏦ | ㏧ | ㏨ | ㏩ | ㏪ | ㏫ | ㏬ | ㏭ | ㏮ | ㏯ |
| U+33Fx | ㏰ | ㏱ | ㏲ | ㏳ | ㏴ | ㏵ | ㏶ | ㏷ | ㏸ | ㏹ | ㏺ | ㏻ | ㏼ | ㏽ | ㏾ | ㏿ |
Notes 1.As of Unicode version 18.0

==== CJK Compatibility Forms ====
CJK Compatibility Forms^{[1]} Official Unicode Consortium code chart (PDF)
| | 0 | 1 | 2 | 3 | 4 | 5 | 6 | 7 | 8 | 9 | A | B | C | D | E | F |
| U+FE3x | ︰ | ︱ | ︲ | ︳ | ︴ | ︵ | ︶ | ︷ | ︸ | ︹ | ︺ | ︻ | ︼ | ︽ | ︾ | ︿ |
| U+FE4x | ﹀ | ﹁ | ﹂ | ﹃ | ﹄ | ﹅ | ﹆ | ﹇ | ﹈ | ﹉ | ﹊ | ﹋ | ﹌ | ﹍ | ﹎ | ﹏ |
Notes 1.As of Unicode version 18.0

==== CJK Radicals ====
Kangxi Radicals^{[1]}^{[2]} Official Unicode Consortium code chart (PDF)
| | 0 | 1 | 2 | 3 | 4 | 5 | 6 | 7 | 8 | 9 | A | B | C | D | E | F |
| U+2F0x | ⼀ | ⼁ | ⼂ | ⼃ | ⼄ | ⼅ | ⼆ | ⼇ | ⼈ | ⼉ | ⼊ | ⼋ | ⼌ | ⼍ | ⼎ | ⼏ |
| U+2F1x | ⼐ | ⼑ | ⼒ | ⼓ | ⼔ | ⼕ | ⼖ | ⼗ | ⼘ | ⼙ | ⼚ | ⼛ | ⼜ | ⼝ | ⼞ | ⼟ |
| U+2F2x | ⼠ | ⼡ | ⼢ | ⼣ | ⼤ | ⼥ | ⼦ | ⼧ | ⼨ | ⼩ | ⼪ | ⼫ | ⼬ | ⼭ | ⼮ | ⼯ |
| U+2F3x | ⼰ | ⼱ | ⼲ | ⼳ | ⼴ | ⼵ | ⼶ | ⼷ | ⼸ | ⼹ | ⼺ | ⼻ | ⼼ | ⼽ | ⼾ | ⼿ |
| U+2F4x | ⽀ | ⽁ | ⽂ | ⽃ | ⽄ | ⽅ | ⽆ | ⽇ | ⽈ | ⽉ | ⽊ | ⽋ | ⽌ | ⽍ | ⽎ | ⽏ |
| U+2F5x | ⽐ | ⽑ | ⽒ | ⽓ | ⽔ | ⽕ | ⽖ | ⽗ | ⽘ | ⽙ | ⽚ | ⽛ | ⽜ | ⽝ | ⽞ | ⽟ |
| U+2F6x | ⽠ | ⽡ | ⽢ | ⽣ | ⽤ | ⽥ | ⽦ | ⽧ | ⽨ | ⽩ | ⽪ | ⽫ | ⽬ | ⽭ | ⽮ | ⽯ |
| U+2F7x | ⽰ | ⽱ | ⽲ | ⽳ | ⽴ | ⽵ | ⽶ | ⽷ | ⽸ | ⽹ | ⽺ | ⽻ | ⽼ | ⽽ | ⽾ | ⽿ |
| U+2F8x | ⾀ | ⾁ | ⾂ | ⾃ | ⾄ | ⾅ | ⾆ | ⾇ | ⾈ | ⾉ | ⾊ | ⾋ | ⾌ | ⾍ | ⾎ | ⾏ |
| U+2F9x | ⾐ | ⾑ | ⾒ | ⾓ | ⾔ | ⾕ | ⾖ | ⾗ | ⾘ | ⾙ | ⾚ | ⾛ | ⾜ | ⾝ | ⾞ | ⾟ |
| U+2FAx | ⾠ | ⾡ | ⾢ | ⾣ | ⾤ | ⾥ | ⾦ | ⾧ | ⾨ | ⾩ | ⾪ | ⾫ | ⾬ | ⾭ | ⾮ | ⾯ |
| U+2FBx | ⾰ | ⾱ | ⾲ | ⾳ | ⾴ | ⾵ | ⾶ | ⾷ | ⾸ | ⾹ | ⾺ | ⾻ | ⾼ | ⾽ | ⾾ | ⾿ |
| U+2FCx | ⿀ | ⿁ | ⿂ | ⿃ | ⿄ | ⿅ | ⿆ | ⿇ | ⿈ | ⿉ | ⿊ | ⿋ | ⿌ | ⿍ | ⿎ | ⿏ |
| U+2FDx | ⿐ | ⿑ | ⿒ | ⿓ | ⿔ | ⿕ | | | | | | | | | | |
Notes 1.As of Unicode version 18.0 2.Grey areas indicate non-assigned code points

CJK Radicals Supplement^{[1]}^{[2]} Official Unicode Consortium code chart (PDF)
| | 0 | 1 | 2 | 3 | 4 | 5 | 6 | 7 | 8 | 9 | A | B | C | D | E | F |
| U+2E8x | ⺀ | ⺁ | ⺂ | ⺃ | ⺄ | ⺅ | ⺆ | ⺇ | ⺈ | ⺉ | ⺊ | ⺋ | ⺌ | ⺍ | ⺎ | ⺏ |
| U+2E9x | ⺐ | ⺑ | ⺒ | ⺓ | ⺔ | ⺕ | ⺖ | ⺗ | ⺘ | ⺙ | | ⺛ | ⺜ | ⺝ | ⺞ | ⺟ |
| U+2EAx | ⺠ | ⺡ | ⺢ | ⺣ | ⺤ | ⺥ | ⺦ | ⺧ | ⺨ | ⺩ | ⺪ | ⺫ | ⺬ | ⺭ | ⺮ | ⺯ |
| U+2EBx | ⺰ | ⺱ | ⺲ | ⺳ | ⺴ | ⺵ | ⺶ | ⺷ | ⺸ | ⺹ | ⺺ | ⺻ | ⺼ | ⺽ | ⺾ | ⺿ |
| U+2ECx | ⻀ | ⻁ | ⻂ | ⻃ | ⻄ | ⻅ | ⻆ | ⻇ | ⻈ | ⻉ | ⻊ | ⻋ | ⻌ | ⻍ | ⻎ | ⻏ |
| U+2EDx | ⻐ | ⻑ | ⻒ | ⻓ | ⻔ | ⻕ | ⻖ | ⻗ | ⻘ | ⻙ | ⻚ | ⻛ | ⻜ | ⻝ | ⻞ | ⻟ |
| U+2EEx | ⻠ | ⻡ | ⻢ | ⻣ | ⻤ | ⻥ | ⻦ | ⻧ | ⻨ | ⻩ | ⻪ | ⻫ | ⻬ | ⻭ | ⻮ | ⻯ |
| U+2EFx | ⻰ | ⻱ | ⻲ | ⻳ | | | | | | | | | | | | |
Notes 1.As of Unicode version 18.0 2.Grey areas indicate non-assigned code points

==== CJK Strokes ====
CJK Strokes^{[1]}^{[2]} Official Unicode Consortium code chart (PDF)
| | 0 | 1 | 2 | 3 | 4 | 5 | 6 | 7 | 8 | 9 | A | B | C | D | E | F |
| U+31Cx | ㇀ | ㇁ | ㇂ | ㇃ | ㇄ | ㇅ | ㇆ | ㇇ | ㇈ | ㇉ | ㇊ | ㇋ | ㇌ | ㇍ | ㇎ | ㇏ |
| U+31Dx | ㇐ | ㇑ | ㇒ | ㇓ | ㇔ | ㇕ | ㇖ | ㇗ | ㇘ | ㇙ | ㇚ | ㇛ | ㇜ | ㇝ | ㇞ | ㇟ |
| U+31Ex | ㇠ | ㇡ | ㇢ | ㇣ | ㇤ | ㇥ | | | | | | | | | | ㇯ |
Notes 1.As of Unicode version 18.0 2.Grey areas indicate non-assigned code points

==== Ideographic Description Characters ====
Ideographic Description Characters^{[1]} Official Unicode Consortium code chart (PDF)
| | 0 | 1 | 2 | 3 | 4 | 5 | 6 | 7 | 8 | 9 | A | B | C | D | E | F |
| U+2FFx | ⿰ | ⿱ | ⿲ | ⿳ | ⿴ | ⿵ | ⿶ | ⿷ | ⿸ | ⿹ | ⿺ | ⿻ | ⿼ | ⿽ | ⿾ | ⿿ |
Notes 1.As of Unicode version 18.0

==== Halfwidth and fullwidth Forms ====
Halfwidth and Fullwidth Forms^{[1]}^{[2]} Official Unicode Consortium code chart (PDF)
| | 0 | 1 | 2 | 3 | 4 | 5 | 6 | 7 | 8 | 9 | A | B | C | D | E | F |
| U+FF0x | | ！ | ＂ | ＃ | ＄ | ％ | ＆ | ＇ | （ | ） | ＊ | ＋ | ， | － | ． | ／ |
| U+FF1x | ０ | １ | ２ | ３ | ４ | ５ | ６ | ７ | ８ | ９ | ： | ； | ＜ | ＝ | ＞ | ？ |
| U+FF2x | ＠ | Ａ | Ｂ | Ｃ | Ｄ | Ｅ | Ｆ | Ｇ | Ｈ | Ｉ | Ｊ | Ｋ | Ｌ | Ｍ | Ｎ | Ｏ |
| U+FF3x | Ｐ | Ｑ | Ｒ | Ｓ | Ｔ | Ｕ | Ｖ | Ｗ | Ｘ | Ｙ | Ｚ | ［ | ＼ | ］ | ＾ | ＿ |
| U+FF4x | ｀ | ａ | ｂ | ｃ | ｄ | ｅ | ｆ | ｇ | ｈ | ｉ | ｊ | ｋ | ｌ | ｍ | ｎ | ｏ |
| U+FF5x | ｐ | ｑ | ｒ | ｓ | ｔ | ｕ | ｖ | ｗ | ｘ | ｙ | ｚ | ｛ | ｜ | ｝ | ～ | ｟ |
| U+FF6x | ｠ | ｡ | ｢ | ｣ | ､ | ･ | ｦ | ｧ | ｨ | ｩ | ｪ | ｫ | ｬ | ｭ | ｮ | ｯ |
| U+FF7x | ｰ | ｱ | ｲ | ｳ | ｴ | ｵ | ｶ | ｷ | ｸ | ｹ | ｺ | ｻ | ｼ | ｽ | ｾ | ｿ |
| U+FF8x | ﾀ | ﾁ | ﾂ | ﾃ | ﾄ | ﾅ | ﾆ | ﾇ | ﾈ | ﾉ | ﾊ | ﾋ | ﾌ | ﾍ | ﾎ | ﾏ |
| U+FF9x | ﾐ | ﾑ | ﾒ | ﾓ | ﾔ | ﾕ | ﾖ | ﾗ | ﾘ | ﾙ | ﾚ | ﾛ | ﾜ | ﾝ | ﾞ | ﾟ |
| U+FFAx | HW; HF | ﾡ | ﾢ | ﾣ | ﾤ | ﾥ | ﾦ | ﾧ | ﾨ | ﾩ | ﾪ | ﾫ | ﾬ | ﾭ | ﾮ | ﾯ |
| U+FFBx | ﾰ | ﾱ | ﾲ | ﾳ | ﾴ | ﾵ | ﾶ | ﾷ | ﾸ | ﾹ | ﾺ | ﾻ | ﾼ | ﾽ | ﾾ | |
| U+FFCx | | | ￂ | ￃ | ￄ | ￅ | ￆ | ￇ | | | ￊ | ￋ | ￌ | ￍ | ￎ | ￏ |
| U+FFDx | | | ￒ | ￓ | ￔ | ￕ | ￖ | ￗ | | | ￚ | ￛ | ￜ | | | |
| U+FFEx | ￠ | ￡ | ￢ | ￣ | ￤ | ￥ | ￦ | | ￨ | ￩ | ￪ | ￫ | ￬ | ￭ | ￮ | |
Notes 1.As of Unicode version 18.0 2.Grey areas indicate non-assigned code points

Small Form Variants^{[1]}^{[2]} Official Unicode Consortium code chart (PDF)
| | 0 | 1 | 2 | 3 | 4 | 5 | 6 | 7 | 8 | 9 | A | B | C | D | E | F |
| U+FE5x | ﹐ | ﹑ | ﹒ | | ﹔ | ﹕ | ﹖ | ﹗ | ﹘ | ﹙ | ﹚ | ﹛ | ﹜ | ﹝ | ﹞ | ﹟ |
| U+FE6x | ﹠ | ﹡ | ﹢ | ﹣ | ﹤ | ﹥ | ﹦ | | ﹨ | ﹩ | ﹪ | ﹫ | | | | |
Notes 1.As of Unicode version 18.0 2.Grey areas indicate non-assigned code points

==== Modifier Tone Letters ====
Modifier Tone Letters^{[1]} Official Unicode Consortium code chart (PDF)
| | 0 | 1 | 2 | 3 | 4 | 5 | 6 | 7 | 8 | 9 | A | B | C | D | E | F |
| U+A70x | ꜀ | ꜁ | ꜂ | ꜃ | ꜄ | ꜅ | ꜆ | ꜇ | ꜈ | ꜉ | ꜊ | ꜋ | ꜌ | ꜍ | ꜎ | ꜏ |
| U+A71x | ꜐ | ꜑ | ꜒ | ꜓ | ꜔ | ꜕ | ꜖ | ꜗ | ꜘ | ꜙ | ꜚ | ꜛ | ꜜ | ꜝ | ꜞ | ꜟ |
Notes 1.As of Unicode version 18.0

=== Bopomofo ===
Bopomofo^{[1]}^{[2]} Official Unicode Consortium code chart (PDF)
| | 0 | 1 | 2 | 3 | 4 | 5 | 6 | 7 | 8 | 9 | A | B | C | D | E | F |
| U+310x | | | | | | ㄅ | ㄆ | ㄇ | ㄈ | ㄉ | ㄊ | ㄋ | ㄌ | ㄍ | ㄎ | ㄏ |
| U+311x | ㄐ | ㄑ | ㄒ | ㄓ | ㄔ | ㄕ | ㄖ | ㄗ | ㄘ | ㄙ | ㄚ | ㄛ | ㄜ | ㄝ | ㄞ | ㄟ |
| U+312x | ㄠ | ㄡ | ㄢ | ㄣ | ㄤ | ㄥ | ㄦ | ㄧ | ㄨ | ㄩ | ㄪ | ㄫ | ㄬ | ㄭ | ㄮ | ㄯ |
Notes 1.As of Unicode version 18.0 2.Grey areas indicate non-assigned code points

=== Kana ===
==== Hiragana ====
Hiragana^{[1]}^{[2]} Official Unicode Consortium code chart (PDF)
| | 0 | 1 | 2 | 3 | 4 | 5 | 6 | 7 | 8 | 9 | A | B | C | D | E | F |
| U+304x | | ぁ | あ | ぃ | い | ぅ | う | ぇ | え | ぉ | お | か | が | き | ぎ | く |
| U+305x | ぐ | け | げ | こ | ご | さ | ざ | し | じ | す | ず | せ | ぜ | そ | ぞ | た |
| U+306x | だ | ち | ぢ | っ | つ | づ | て | で | と | ど | な | に | ぬ | ね | の | は |
| U+307x | ば | ぱ | ひ | び | ぴ | ふ | ぶ | ぷ | へ | べ | ぺ | ほ | ぼ | ぽ | ま | み |
| U+308x | む | め | も | ゃ | や | ゅ | ゆ | ょ | よ | ら | り | る | れ | ろ | ゎ | わ |
| U+309x | ゐ | ゑ | を | ん | ゔ | ゕ | ゖ | | | ゙ | ゚ | ゛ | ゜ | ゝ | ゞ | ゟ |
Notes 1.As of Unicode version 18.0 2.Grey areas indicate non-assigned code points

==== Katakana ====
Katakana^{[1]} Official Unicode Consortium code chart (PDF)
| | 0 | 1 | 2 | 3 | 4 | 5 | 6 | 7 | 8 | 9 | A | B | C | D | E | F |
| U+30Ax | ゠ | ァ | ア | ィ | イ | ゥ | ウ | ェ | エ | ォ | オ | カ | ガ | キ | ギ | ク |
| U+30Bx | グ | ケ | ゲ | コ | ゴ | サ | ザ | シ | ジ | ス | ズ | セ | ゼ | ソ | ゾ | タ |
| U+30Cx | ダ | チ | ヂ | ッ | ツ | ヅ | テ | デ | ト | ド | ナ | ニ | ヌ | ネ | ノ | ハ |
| U+30Dx | バ | パ | ヒ | ビ | ピ | フ | ブ | プ | ヘ | ベ | ペ | ホ | ボ | ポ | マ | ミ |
| U+30Ex | ム | メ | モ | ャ | ヤ | ュ | ユ | ョ | ヨ | ラ | リ | ル | レ | ロ | ヮ | ワ |
| U+30Fx | ヰ | ヱ | ヲ | ン | ヴ | ヵ | ヶ | ヷ | ヸ | ヹ | ヺ | ・ | ー | ヽ | ヾ | ヿ |
Notes 1.As of Unicode version 18.0

- Kana Extended-B (Unicode block)

==== Hentaigana ====
- Kana Extended-A (Unicode block)
- Kana Supplement (Unicode block)
- Katakana Phonetic Extensions (Unicode block)
- Small Kana Extension (Unicode block)

=== Hangul Jamo and Compatibility Jamo ===
- Hangul Jamo (Unicode block)
- Hangul Jamo Extended-A
- Hangul Jamo Extended-B
- Hangul Compatibility Jamo
- Hangul Syllables

=== Tangut ===
- Tangut (Unicode block)
- Tangut Components (Unicode block)
- Tangut Components Supplement (Unicode block)
- Tangut Supplement (Unicode block)

=== Other East Asian scripts ===
Ideographic Symbols and Punctuation^{[1]}^{[2]} Official Unicode Consortium code chart (PDF)
| | 0 | 1 | 2 | 3 | 4 | 5 | 6 | 7 | 8 | 9 | A | B | C | D | E | F |
| U+16FEx | 𖿠 | 𖿡 | 𖿢 | 𖿣 | KSS; F | | | | | | | | | | | |
| U+16FFx | 𖿰 | 𖿱 | 𖿲 | 𖿳 | 𖿴 | 𖿵 | 𖿶 | | | | | | | | | |
Notes 1.As of Unicode version 18.0 2.Grey areas indicate non-assigned code points

- Counting Rod Numerals (Unicode block)
- Jurchen (Unicode block)
- Jurchen Radicals (Unicode block)
- Khitan Small Script (Unicode block)
- Lisu (Unicode block)
- Lisu Supplement (Unicode block)
- Miao (Unicode block)
- Nushu (Unicode block)
- Nyiakeng Puachue Hmong (Unicode block)
- Seal (Unicode block)
- Tai Xuan Jing Symbols (Unicode block)
- Vertical Forms (Unicode block)
- Wancho (Unicode block)
- Yi Syllables (Unicode block)
- Yi Radicals (Unicode block)
- Yijing Hexagram Symbols (Unicode block)

== African scripts ==
=== Ge'ez/Ethiopic script ===
Ethiopic^{[1]}^{[2]} Official Unicode Consortium code chart (PDF)
| | 0 | 1 | 2 | 3 | 4 | 5 | 6 | 7 | 8 | 9 | A | B | C | D | E | F |
| U+120x | ሀ | ሁ | ሂ | ሃ | ሄ | ህ | ሆ | ሇ | ለ | ሉ | ሊ | ላ | ሌ | ል | ሎ | ሏ |
| U+121x | ሐ | ሑ | ሒ | ሓ | ሔ | ሕ | ሖ | ሗ | መ | ሙ | ሚ | ማ | ሜ | ም | ሞ | ሟ |
| U+122x | ሠ | ሡ | ሢ | ሣ | ሤ | ሥ | ሦ | ሧ | ረ | ሩ | ሪ | ራ | ሬ | ር | ሮ | ሯ |
| U+123x | ሰ | ሱ | ሲ | ሳ | ሴ | ስ | ሶ | ሷ | ሸ | ሹ | ሺ | ሻ | ሼ | ሽ | ሾ | ሿ |
| U+124x | ቀ | ቁ | ቂ | ቃ | ቄ | ቅ | ቆ | ቇ | ቈ | | ቊ | ቋ | ቌ | ቍ | | |
| U+125x | ቐ | ቑ | ቒ | ቓ | ቔ | ቕ | ቖ | | ቘ | | ቚ | ቛ | ቜ | ቝ | | |
| U+126x | በ | ቡ | ቢ | ባ | ቤ | ብ | ቦ | ቧ | ቨ | ቩ | ቪ | ቫ | ቬ | ቭ | ቮ | ቯ |
| U+127x | ተ | ቱ | ቲ | ታ | ቴ | ት | ቶ | ቷ | ቸ | ቹ | ቺ | ቻ | ቼ | ች | ቾ | ቿ |
| U+128x | ኀ | ኁ | ኂ | ኃ | ኄ | ኅ | ኆ | ኇ | ኈ | | ኊ | ኋ | ኌ | ኍ | | |
| U+129x | ነ | ኑ | ኒ | ና | ኔ | ን | ኖ | ኗ | ኘ | ኙ | ኚ | ኛ | ኜ | ኝ | ኞ | ኟ |
| U+12Ax | አ | ኡ | ኢ | ኣ | ኤ | እ | ኦ | ኧ | ከ | ኩ | ኪ | ካ | ኬ | ክ | ኮ | ኯ |
| U+12Bx | ኰ | | ኲ | ኳ | ኴ | ኵ | | | ኸ | ኹ | ኺ | ኻ | ኼ | ኽ | ኾ | |
| U+12Cx | ዀ | | ዂ | ዃ | ዄ | ዅ | | | ወ | ዉ | ዊ | ዋ | ዌ | ው | ዎ | ዏ |
| U+12Dx | ዐ | ዑ | ዒ | ዓ | ዔ | ዕ | ዖ | | ዘ | ዙ | ዚ | ዛ | ዜ | ዝ | ዞ | ዟ |
| U+12Ex | ዠ | ዡ | ዢ | ዣ | ዤ | ዥ | ዦ | ዧ | የ | ዩ | ዪ | ያ | ዬ | ይ | ዮ | ዯ |
| U+12Fx | ደ | ዱ | ዲ | ዳ | ዴ | ድ | ዶ | ዷ | ዸ | ዹ | ዺ | ዻ | ዼ | ዽ | ዾ | ዿ |
| U+130x | ጀ | ጁ | ጂ | ጃ | ጄ | ጅ | ጆ | ጇ | ገ | ጉ | ጊ | ጋ | ጌ | ግ | ጎ | ጏ |
| U+131x | ጐ | | ጒ | ጓ | ጔ | ጕ | | | ጘ | ጙ | ጚ | ጛ | ጜ | ጝ | ጞ | ጟ |
| U+132x | ጠ | ጡ | ጢ | ጣ | ጤ | ጥ | ጦ | ጧ | ጨ | ጩ | ጪ | ጫ | ጬ | ጭ | ጮ | ጯ |
| U+133x | ጰ | ጱ | ጲ | ጳ | ጴ | ጵ | ጶ | ጷ | ጸ | ጹ | ጺ | ጻ | ጼ | ጽ | ጾ | ጿ |
| U+134x | ፀ | ፁ | ፂ | ፃ | ፄ | ፅ | ፆ | ፇ | ፈ | ፉ | ፊ | ፋ | ፌ | ፍ | ፎ | ፏ |
| U+135x | ፐ | ፑ | ፒ | ፓ | ፔ | ፕ | ፖ | ፗ | ፘ | ፙ | ፚ | | | ፝ | ፞ | ፟ |
| U+136x | ፠ | ፡ | ። | ፣ | ፤ | ፥ | ፦ | ፧ | ፨ | ፩ | ፪ | ፫ | ፬ | ፭ | ፮ | ፯ |
| U+137x | ፰ | ፱ | ፲ | ፳ | ፴ | ፵ | ፶ | ፷ | ፸ | ፹ | ፺ | ፻ | ፼ | | | |
Notes 1.As of Unicode version 18.0 2.Grey areas indicate non-assigned code points

- Ethiopic Supplement
- Ethiopic Extended
- Ethiopic Extended-A
- Ethiopic Extended-B

=== Adlam ===
Adlam^{[1]}^{[2]} Official Unicode Consortium code chart (PDF)
| | 0 | 1 | 2 | 3 | 4 | 5 | 6 | 7 | 8 | 9 | A | B | C | D | E | F |
| U+1E90x | 𞤀 | 𞤁 | 𞤂 | 𞤃 | 𞤄 | 𞤅 | 𞤆 | 𞤇 | 𞤈 | 𞤉 | 𞤊 | 𞤋 | 𞤌 | 𞤍 | 𞤎 | 𞤏 |
| U+1E91x | 𞤐 | 𞤑 | 𞤒 | 𞤓 | 𞤔 | 𞤕 | 𞤖 | 𞤗 | 𞤘 | 𞤙 | 𞤚 | 𞤛 | 𞤜 | 𞤝 | 𞤞 | 𞤟 |
| U+1E92x | 𞤠 | 𞤡 | 𞤢 | 𞤣 | 𞤤 | 𞤥 | 𞤦 | 𞤧 | 𞤨 | 𞤩 | 𞤪 | 𞤫 | 𞤬 | 𞤭 | 𞤮 | 𞤯 |
| U+1E93x | 𞤰 | 𞤱 | 𞤲 | 𞤳 | 𞤴 | 𞤵 | 𞤶 | 𞤷 | 𞤸 | 𞤹 | 𞤺 | 𞤻 | 𞤼 | 𞤽 | 𞤾 | 𞤿 |
| U+1E94x | 𞥀 | 𞥁 | 𞥂 | 𞥃 | 𞥄 | 𞥅 | 𞥆 | 𞥇 | 𞥈 | 𞥉 | 𞥊 | 𞥋 | | | | |
| U+1E95x | 𞥐 | 𞥑 | 𞥒 | 𞥓 | 𞥔 | 𞥕 | 𞥖 | 𞥗 | 𞥘 | 𞥙 | | | | | 𞥞 | 𞥟 |
Notes 1.As of Unicode version 18.0 2.Grey areas indicate non-assigned code points

=== Tifinagh ===
Tifinagh^{[1]}^{[2]} Official Unicode Consortium code chart (PDF)
| | 0 | 1 | 2 | 3 | 4 | 5 | 6 | 7 | 8 | 9 | A | B | C | D | E | F |
| U+2D3x | ⴰ | ⴱ | ⴲ | ⴳ | ⴴ | ⴵ | ⴶ | ⴷ | ⴸ | ⴹ | ⴺ | ⴻ | ⴼ | ⴽ | ⴾ | ⴿ |
| U+2D4x | ⵀ | ⵁ | ⵂ | ⵃ | ⵄ | ⵅ | ⵆ | ⵇ | ⵈ | ⵉ | ⵊ | ⵋ | ⵌ | ⵍ | ⵎ | ⵏ |
| U+2D5x | ⵐ | ⵑ | ⵒ | ⵓ | ⵔ | ⵕ | ⵖ | ⵗ | ⵘ | ⵙ | ⵚ | ⵛ | ⵜ | ⵝ | ⵞ | ⵟ |
| U+2D6x | ⵠ | ⵡ | ⵢ | ⵣ | ⵤ | ⵥ | ⵦ | ⵧ | | | | | | | | ⵯ |
| U+2D7x | ⵰ | | | | | | | | | | | | | | | ⵿ |
Notes 1.As of Unicode version 18.0 2.Grey areas indicate non-assigned code points

=== Other African scripts ===
- Bamum (Unicode block)
- Bamum Supplement (Unicode block)
- Beria Erfe (Unicode block)
- Bassa Vah (Unicode block)
- Garay (Unicode block)
- Medefaidrin (Unicode block)
- Mende Kikakui (Unicode block)
- NKo (Unicode block)
- Osmanya (Unicode block)
- Ottoman Siyaq Numbers
- Vai (Unicode block)

== American scripts ==
=== Cherokee ===
Cherokee^{[1]}^{[2]} Official Unicode Consortium code chart (PDF)
| | 0 | 1 | 2 | 3 | 4 | 5 | 6 | 7 | 8 | 9 | A | B | C | D | E | F |
| U+13Ax | Ꭰ | Ꭱ | Ꭲ | Ꭳ | Ꭴ | Ꭵ | Ꭶ | Ꭷ | Ꭸ | Ꭹ | Ꭺ | Ꭻ | Ꭼ | Ꭽ | Ꭾ | Ꭿ |
| U+13Bx | Ꮀ | Ꮁ | Ꮂ | Ꮃ | Ꮄ | Ꮅ | Ꮆ | Ꮇ | Ꮈ | Ꮉ | Ꮊ | Ꮋ | Ꮌ | Ꮍ | Ꮎ | Ꮏ |
| U+13Cx | Ꮐ | Ꮑ | Ꮒ | Ꮓ | Ꮔ | Ꮕ | Ꮖ | Ꮗ | Ꮘ | Ꮙ | Ꮚ | Ꮛ | Ꮜ | Ꮝ | Ꮞ | Ꮟ |
| U+13Dx | Ꮠ | Ꮡ | Ꮢ | Ꮣ | Ꮤ | Ꮥ | Ꮦ | Ꮧ | Ꮨ | Ꮩ | Ꮪ | Ꮫ | Ꮬ | Ꮭ | Ꮮ | Ꮯ |
| U+13Ex | Ꮰ | Ꮱ | Ꮲ | Ꮳ | Ꮴ | Ꮵ | Ꮶ | Ꮷ | Ꮸ | Ꮹ | Ꮺ | Ꮻ | Ꮼ | Ꮽ | Ꮾ | Ꮿ |
| U+13Fx | Ᏸ | Ᏹ | Ᏺ | Ᏻ | Ᏼ | Ᏽ | | | ᏸ | ᏹ | ᏺ | ᏻ | ᏼ | ᏽ | | |
Notes 1.As of Unicode version 18.0 2.Grey areas indicate non-assigned code points

Cherokee Supplement^{[1]} Official Unicode Consortium code chart (PDF)
| | 0 | 1 | 2 | 3 | 4 | 5 | 6 | 7 | 8 | 9 | A | B | C | D | E | F |
| U+AB7x | ꭰ | ꭱ | ꭲ | ꭳ | ꭴ | ꭵ | ꭶ | ꭷ | ꭸ | ꭹ | ꭺ | ꭻ | ꭼ | ꭽ | ꭾ | ꭿ |
| U+AB8x | ꮀ | ꮁ | ꮂ | ꮃ | ꮄ | ꮅ | ꮆ | ꮇ | ꮈ | ꮉ | ꮊ | ꮋ | ꮌ | ꮍ | ꮎ | ꮏ |
| U+AB9x | ꮐ | ꮑ | ꮒ | ꮓ | ꮔ | ꮕ | ꮖ | ꮗ | ꮘ | ꮙ | ꮚ | ꮛ | ꮜ | ꮝ | ꮞ | ꮟ |
| U+ABAx | ꮠ | ꮡ | ꮢ | ꮣ | ꮤ | ꮥ | ꮦ | ꮧ | ꮨ | ꮩ | ꮪ | ꮫ | ꮬ | ꮭ | ꮮ | ꮯ |
| U+ABBx | ꮰ | ꮱ | ꮲ | ꮳ | ꮴ | ꮵ | ꮶ | ꮷ | ꮸ | ꮹ | ꮺ | ꮻ | ꮼ | ꮽ | ꮾ | ꮿ |
Notes 1.As of Unicode version 18.0

=== Unified Canadian Aboriginal Syllabics ===
Unified Canadian Aboriginal Syllabics^{[1]} Official Unicode Consortium code chart (PDF)
| | 0 | 1 | 2 | 3 | 4 | 5 | 6 | 7 | 8 | 9 | A | B | C | D | E | F |
| U+140x | ᐀ | ᐁ | ᐂ | ᐃ | ᐄ | ᐅ | ᐆ | ᐇ | ᐈ | ᐉ | ᐊ | ᐋ | ᐌ | ᐍ | ᐎ | ᐏ |
| U+141x | ᐐ | ᐑ | ᐒ | ᐓ | ᐔ | ᐕ | ᐖ | ᐗ | ᐘ | ᐙ | ᐚ | ᐛ | ᐜ | ᐝ | ᐞ | ᐟ |
| U+142x | ᐠ | ᐡ | ᐢ | ᐣ | ᐤ | ᐥ | ᐦ | ᐧ | ᐨ | ᐩ | ᐪ | ᐫ | ᐬ | ᐭ | ᐮ | ᐯ |
| U+143x | ᐰ | ᐱ | ᐲ | ᐳ | ᐴ | ᐵ | ᐶ | ᐷ | ᐸ | ᐹ | ᐺ | ᐻ | ᐼ | ᐽ | ᐾ | ᐿ |
| U+144x | ᑀ | ᑁ | ᑂ | ᑃ | ᑄ | ᑅ | ᑆ | ᑇ | ᑈ | ᑉ | ᑊ | ᑋ | ᑌ | ᑍ | ᑎ | ᑏ |
| U+145x | ᑐ | ᑑ | ᑒ | ᑓ | ᑔ | ᑕ | ᑖ | ᑗ | ᑘ | ᑙ | ᑚ | ᑛ | ᑜ | ᑝ | ᑞ | ᑟ |
| U+146x | ᑠ | ᑡ | ᑢ | ᑣ | ᑤ | ᑥ | ᑦ | ᑧ | ᑨ | ᑩ | ᑪ | ᑫ | ᑬ | ᑭ | ᑮ | ᑯ |
| U+147x | ᑰ | ᑱ | ᑲ | ᑳ | ᑴ | ᑵ | ᑶ | ᑷ | ᑸ | ᑹ | ᑺ | ᑻ | ᑼ | ᑽ | ᑾ | ᑿ |
| U+148x | ᒀ | ᒁ | ᒂ | ᒃ | ᒄ | ᒅ | ᒆ | ᒇ | ᒈ | ᒉ | ᒊ | ᒋ | ᒌ | ᒍ | ᒎ | ᒏ |
| U+149x | ᒐ | ᒑ | ᒒ | ᒓ | ᒔ | ᒕ | ᒖ | ᒗ | ᒘ | ᒙ | ᒚ | ᒛ | ᒜ | ᒝ | ᒞ | ᒟ |
| U+14Ax | ᒠ | ᒡ | ᒢ | ᒣ | ᒤ | ᒥ | ᒦ | ᒧ | ᒨ | ᒩ | ᒪ | ᒫ | ᒬ | ᒭ | ᒮ | ᒯ |
| U+14Bx | ᒰ | ᒱ | ᒲ | ᒳ | ᒴ | ᒵ | ᒶ | ᒷ | ᒸ | ᒹ | ᒺ | ᒻ | ᒼ | ᒽ | ᒾ | ᒿ |
| U+14Cx | ᓀ | ᓁ | ᓂ | ᓃ | ᓄ | ᓅ | ᓆ | ᓇ | ᓈ | ᓉ | ᓊ | ᓋ | ᓌ | ᓍ | ᓎ | ᓏ |
| U+14Dx | ᓐ | ᓑ | ᓒ | ᓓ | ᓔ | ᓕ | ᓖ | ᓗ | ᓘ | ᓙ | ᓚ | ᓛ | ᓜ | ᓝ | ᓞ | ᓟ |
| U+14Ex | ᓠ | ᓡ | ᓢ | ᓣ | ᓤ | ᓥ | ᓦ | ᓧ | ᓨ | ᓩ | ᓪ | ᓫ | ᓬ | ᓭ | ᓮ | ᓯ |
| U+14Fx | ᓰ | ᓱ | ᓲ | ᓳ | ᓴ | ᓵ | ᓶ | ᓷ | ᓸ | ᓹ | ᓺ | ᓻ | ᓼ | ᓽ | ᓾ | ᓿ |
| U+150x | ᔀ | ᔁ | ᔂ | ᔃ | ᔄ | ᔅ | ᔆ | ᔇ | ᔈ | ᔉ | ᔊ | ᔋ | ᔌ | ᔍ | ᔎ | ᔏ |
| U+151x | ᔐ | ᔑ | ᔒ | ᔓ | ᔔ | ᔕ | ᔖ | ᔗ | ᔘ | ᔙ | ᔚ | ᔛ | ᔜ | ᔝ | ᔞ | ᔟ |
| U+152x | ᔠ | ᔡ | ᔢ | ᔣ | ᔤ | ᔥ | ᔦ | ᔧ | ᔨ | ᔩ | ᔪ | ᔫ | ᔬ | ᔭ | ᔮ | ᔯ |
| U+153x | ᔰ | ᔱ | ᔲ | ᔳ | ᔴ | ᔵ | ᔶ | ᔷ | ᔸ | ᔹ | ᔺ | ᔻ | ᔼ | ᔽ | ᔾ | ᔿ |
| U+154x | ᕀ | ᕁ | ᕂ | ᕃ | ᕄ | ᕅ | ᕆ | ᕇ | ᕈ | ᕉ | ᕊ | ᕋ | ᕌ | ᕍ | ᕎ | ᕏ |
| U+155x | ᕐ | ᕑ | ᕒ | ᕓ | ᕔ | ᕕ | ᕖ | ᕗ | ᕘ | ᕙ | ᕚ | ᕛ | ᕜ | ᕝ | ᕞ | ᕟ |
| U+156x | ᕠ | ᕡ | ᕢ | ᕣ | ᕤ | ᕥ | ᕦ | ᕧ | ᕨ | ᕩ | ᕪ | ᕫ | ᕬ | ᕭ | ᕮ | ᕯ |
| U+157x | ᕰ | ᕱ | ᕲ | ᕳ | ᕴ | ᕵ | ᕶ | ᕷ | ᕸ | ᕹ | ᕺ | ᕻ | ᕼ | ᕽ | ᕾ | ᕿ |
| U+158x | ᖀ | ᖁ | ᖂ | ᖃ | ᖄ | ᖅ | ᖆ | ᖇ | ᖈ | ᖉ | ᖊ | ᖋ | ᖌ | ᖍ | ᖎ | ᖏ |
| U+159x | ᖐ | ᖑ | ᖒ | ᖓ | ᖔ | ᖕ | ᖖ | ᖗ | ᖘ | ᖙ | ᖚ | ᖛ | ᖜ | ᖝ | ᖞ | ᖟ |
| U+15Ax | ᖠ | ᖡ | ᖢ | ᖣ | ᖤ | ᖥ | ᖦ | ᖧ | ᖨ | ᖩ | ᖪ | ᖫ | ᖬ | ᖭ | ᖮ | ᖯ |
| U+15Bx | ᖰ | ᖱ | ᖲ | ᖳ | ᖴ | ᖵ | ᖶ | ᖷ | ᖸ | ᖹ | ᖺ | ᖻ | ᖼ | ᖽ | ᖾ | ᖿ |
| U+15Cx | ᗀ | ᗁ | ᗂ | ᗃ | ᗄ | ᗅ | ᗆ | ᗇ | ᗈ | ᗉ | ᗊ | ᗋ | ᗌ | ᗍ | ᗎ | ᗏ |
| U+15Dx | ᗐ | ᗑ | ᗒ | ᗓ | ᗔ | ᗕ | ᗖ | ᗗ | ᗘ | ᗙ | ᗚ | ᗛ | ᗜ | ᗝ | ᗞ | ᗟ |
| U+15Ex | ᗠ | ᗡ | ᗢ | ᗣ | ᗤ | ᗥ | ᗦ | ᗧ | ᗨ | ᗩ | ᗪ | ᗫ | ᗬ | ᗭ | ᗮ | ᗯ |
| U+15Fx | ᗰ | ᗱ | ᗲ | ᗳ | ᗴ | ᗵ | ᗶ | ᗷ | ᗸ | ᗹ | ᗺ | ᗻ | ᗼ | ᗽ | ᗾ | ᗿ |
| U+160x | ᘀ | ᘁ | ᘂ | ᘃ | ᘄ | ᘅ | ᘆ | ᘇ | ᘈ | ᘉ | ᘊ | ᘋ | ᘌ | ᘍ | ᘎ | ᘏ |
| U+161x | ᘐ | ᘑ | ᘒ | ᘓ | ᘔ | ᘕ | ᘖ | ᘗ | ᘘ | ᘙ | ᘚ | ᘛ | ᘜ | ᘝ | ᘞ | ᘟ |
| U+162x | ᘠ | ᘡ | ᘢ | ᘣ | ᘤ | ᘥ | ᘦ | ᘧ | ᘨ | ᘩ | ᘪ | ᘫ | ᘬ | ᘭ | ᘮ | ᘯ |
| U+163x | ᘰ | ᘱ | ᘲ | ᘳ | ᘴ | ᘵ | ᘶ | ᘷ | ᘸ | ᘹ | ᘺ | ᘻ | ᘼ | ᘽ | ᘾ | ᘿ |
| U+164x | ᙀ | ᙁ | ᙂ | ᙃ | ᙄ | ᙅ | ᙆ | ᙇ | ᙈ | ᙉ | ᙊ | ᙋ | ᙌ | ᙍ | ᙎ | ᙏ |
| U+165x | ᙐ | ᙑ | ᙒ | ᙓ | ᙔ | ᙕ | ᙖ | ᙗ | ᙘ | ᙙ | ᙚ | ᙛ | ᙜ | ᙝ | ᙞ | ᙟ |
| U+166x | ᙠ | ᙡ | ᙢ | ᙣ | ᙤ | ᙥ | ᙦ | ᙧ | ᙨ | ᙩ | ᙪ | ᙫ | ᙬ | ᙭ | ᙮ | ᙯ |
| U+167x | ᙰ | ᙱ | ᙲ | ᙳ | ᙴ | ᙵ | ᙶ | ᙷ | ᙸ | ᙹ | ᙺ | ᙻ | ᙼ | ᙽ | ᙾ | ᙿ |
Notes 1.As of Unicode version 18.0

=== Deseret ===
Deseret^{[1]} Official Unicode Consortium code chart (PDF)
| | 0 | 1 | 2 | 3 | 4 | 5 | 6 | 7 | 8 | 9 | A | B | C | D | E | F |
| U+1040x | 𐐀 | 𐐁 | 𐐂 | 𐐃 | 𐐄 | 𐐅 | 𐐆 | 𐐇 | 𐐈 | 𐐉 | 𐐊 | 𐐋 | 𐐌 | 𐐍 | 𐐎 | 𐐏 |
| U+1041x | 𐐐 | 𐐑 | 𐐒 | 𐐓 | 𐐔 | 𐐕 | 𐐖 | 𐐗 | 𐐘 | 𐐙 | 𐐚 | 𐐛 | 𐐜 | 𐐝 | 𐐞 | 𐐟 |
| U+1042x | 𐐠 | 𐐡 | 𐐢 | 𐐣 | 𐐤 | 𐐥 | 𐐦 | 𐐧 | 𐐨 | 𐐩 | 𐐪 | 𐐫 | 𐐬 | 𐐭 | 𐐮 | 𐐯 |
| U+1043x | 𐐰 | 𐐱 | 𐐲 | 𐐳 | 𐐴 | 𐐵 | 𐐶 | 𐐷 | 𐐸 | 𐐹 | 𐐺 | 𐐻 | 𐐼 | 𐐽 | 𐐾 | 𐐿 |
| U+1044x | 𐑀 | 𐑁 | 𐑂 | 𐑃 | 𐑄 | 𐑅 | 𐑆 | 𐑇 | 𐑈 | 𐑉 | 𐑊 | 𐑋 | 𐑌 | 𐑍 | 𐑎 | 𐑏 |
Notes 1.As of Unicode version 18.0

=== Osage ===
Osage^{[1]}^{[2]} Official Unicode Consortium code chart (PDF)
| | 0 | 1 | 2 | 3 | 4 | 5 | 6 | 7 | 8 | 9 | A | B | C | D | E | F |
| U+104Bx | 𐒰 | 𐒱 | 𐒲 | 𐒳 | 𐒴 | 𐒵 | 𐒶 | 𐒷 | 𐒸 | 𐒹 | 𐒺 | 𐒻 | 𐒼 | 𐒽 | 𐒾 | 𐒿 |
| U+104Cx | 𐓀 | 𐓁 | 𐓂 | 𐓃 | 𐓄 | 𐓅 | 𐓆 | 𐓇 | 𐓈 | 𐓉 | 𐓊 | 𐓋 | 𐓌 | 𐓍 | 𐓎 | 𐓏 |
| U+104Dx | 𐓐 | 𐓑 | 𐓒 | 𐓓 | | | | | 𐓘 | 𐓙 | 𐓚 | 𐓛 | 𐓜 | 𐓝 | 𐓞 | 𐓟 |
| U+104Ex | 𐓠 | 𐓡 | 𐓢 | 𐓣 | 𐓤 | 𐓥 | 𐓦 | 𐓧 | 𐓨 | 𐓩 | 𐓪 | 𐓫 | 𐓬 | 𐓭 | 𐓮 | 𐓯 |
| U+104Fx | 𐓰 | 𐓱 | 𐓲 | 𐓳 | 𐓴 | 𐓵 | 𐓶 | 𐓷 | 𐓸 | 𐓹 | 𐓺 | 𐓻 | | | | |
Notes 1.As of Unicode version 18.0 2.Grey areas indicate non-assigned code points

=== Kaktovik Numerals ===
Kaktovik Numerals^{[1]}^{[2]} Official Unicode Consortium code chart (PDF)
| | 0 | 1 | 2 | 3 | 4 | 5 | 6 | 7 | 8 | 9 | A | B | C | D | E | F |
| U+1D2Cx | 𝋀 | 𝋁 | 𝋂 | 𝋃 | 𝋄 | 𝋅 | 𝋆 | 𝋇 | 𝋈 | 𝋉 | 𝋊 | 𝋋 | 𝋌 | 𝋍 | 𝋎 | 𝋏 |
| U+1D2Dx | 𝋐 | 𝋑 | 𝋒 | 𝋓 | | | | | | | | | | | | |
Notes 1.As of Unicode version 18.0 2.Grey areas indicate non-assigned code points

=== Maya ===
Mayan Numerals^{[1]}^{[2]} Official Unicode Consortium code chart (PDF)
| | 0 | 1 | 2 | 3 | 4 | 5 | 6 | 7 | 8 | 9 | A | B | C | D | E | F |
| U+1D2Ex | 𝋠 | 𝋡 | 𝋢 | 𝋣 | 𝋤 | 𝋥 | 𝋦 | 𝋧 | 𝋨 | 𝋩 | 𝋪 | 𝋫 | 𝋬 | 𝋭 | 𝋮 | 𝋯 |
| U+1D2Fx | 𝋰 | 𝋱 | 𝋲 | 𝋳 | | | | | | | | | | | | |
Notes 1.As of Unicode version 18.0 2.Grey areas indicate non-assigned code points

== Alphabetic Presentation Forms ==
Alphabetic Presentation Forms^{[1]}^{[2]} Official Unicode Consortium code chart (PDF)
| | 0 | 1 | 2 | 3 | 4 | 5 | 6 | 7 | 8 | 9 | A | B | C | D | E | F |
| U+FB0x | ﬀ | ﬁ | ﬂ | ﬃ | ﬄ | ﬅ | ﬆ | | | | | | | | | |
| U+FB1x | | | | ﬓ | ﬔ | ﬕ | ﬖ | ﬗ | | | | | | יִ | ﬞ | ײַ |
| U+FB2x | ﬠ | ﬡ | ﬢ | ﬣ | ﬤ | ﬥ | ﬦ | ﬧ | ﬨ | ﬩ | שׁ | שׂ | שּׁ | שּׂ | אַ | אָ |
| U+FB3x | אּ | בּ | גּ | דּ | הּ | וּ | זּ | | טּ | יּ | ךּ | כּ | לּ | | מּ | |
| U+FB4x | נּ | סּ | | ףּ | פּ | | צּ | קּ | רּ | שּ | תּ | וֹ | בֿ | כֿ | פֿ | ﭏ |
Notes 1.As of Unicode version 18.0 2.Grey areas indicate non-assigned code points

== Ancient and historic scripts ==
=== Cuneiform ===
- Archaic Cuneiform Numerals (Unicode block)

==== Sumero-Akkadian ====
- Cuneiform (Unicode block)
- Cuneiform Numbers and Punctuation (Unicode block)
- Early Dynastic Cuneiform (Unicode block)

==== Ugaritic ====
- Ugaritic (Unicode block)

==== Old Persian ====
- Old Persian (Unicode block)

=== Hieroglyphs ===
- Egyptian Hieroglyphs (Unicode block)
- Egyptian Hieroglyphs Extended-A (Unicode block)
- Egyptian Hieroglyph Format Controls (Unicode block)
- Meroitic Cursive (Unicode block)
- Meroitic Hieroglyphs (Unicode block)
- Anatolian Hieroglyphs (Unicode block)

== General Punctuation ==
112 code points; 111 assigned characters; 24 in the MES-2 subset.

General Punctuation^{[1]}^{[2]}^{[3]} Official Unicode Consortium code chart (PDF)
| | 0 | 1 | 2 | 3 | 4 | 5 | 6 | 7 | 8 | 9 | A | B | C | D | E | F |
| U+200x | NQ; SP | MQ; SP | EN; SP | EM; SP | 3/M; SP | 4/M; SP | 6/M; SP | F SP | P SP | TH; SP | H SP | ZW; SP | ZW; NJ | ZW; J | LRM | RLM |
| U+201x | ‐ | NB ‑ | ‒ | – | — | ― | ‖ | ‗ | ‘ | ’ | ‚ | ‛ | “ | ” | „ | ‟ |
| U+202x | † | ‡ | • | ‣ | ․ | ‥ | … | ‧ | L SEP | P SEP | LRE | RLE | PDF | LRO | RLO | NNB; SP |
| U+203x | ‰ | ‱ | ′ | ″ | ‴ | ‵ | ‶ | ‷ | ‸ | ‹ | › | ※ | ‼ | ‽ | ‾ | ‿ |
| U+204x | ⁀ | ⁁ | ⁂ | ⁃ | / | ⁅ | ⁆ | ⁇ | ⁈ | ⁉ | ⁊ | ⁋ | ⁌ | ⁍ | ⁎ | ⁏ |
| U+205x | ⁐ | ⁑ | ⁒ | ⁓ | ⁔ | ⁕ | ⁖ | ⁗ | ⁘ | ⁙ | ⁚ | ⁛ | ⁜ | ⁝ | ⁞ | MM; SP |
| U+206x | WJ | ƒ() | × | , | + | | LRI | RLI | FSI | PDI | I SS | A SS | I AFS | A AFS | NA; DS | NO; DS |
Notes 1.As of Unicode version 18.0 2.Grey area indicates non-assigned code point 3.Unicode code points U+206A – U+206F are deprecated as of Unicode version 3.0

| Code | Glyph | Description | # |
|---|---|---|---|
| U+2013 | – | En dash | 0903 |
| U+2014 | — | Em dash | 0904 |
| U+2015 | ― | Horizontal bar | 0905 |
| U+2017 | ‗ | Double low line | 0906 |
| U+2018 | ‘ | Left single quotation mark | 0907 |
| U+2019 | ’ | Right single quotation mark | 0908 |
| U+201A | ‚ | Single low-9 quotation mark | 0909 |
| U+201B | ‛ | Single high-reversed-9 quotation mark | 0910 |
| U+201C | “ | Left double quotation mark | 0911 |
| U+201D | ” | Right double quotation mark | 0912 |
| U+201E | „ | Double low-9 quotation mark | 0913 |
| U+2020 | † | Dagger | 0914 |
| U+2021 | ‡ | Double dagger | 0915 |
| U+2022 | • | Bullet | 0916 |
| U+2026 | … | Horizontal ellipsis | 0917 |
| U+2030 | ‰ | Per mille sign | 0918 |
| U+2032 | ′ | Prime | 0919 |
| U+2033 | ″ | Double prime | 0920 |
| U+2039 | ‹ | Single left-pointing angle quotation mark | 0921 |
| U+203A | › | Single right-pointing angle quotation mark | 0922 |
| U+203C | ‼ | Double exclamation mark | 0923 |
| U+203E | ‾ | Overline | 0924 |
| U+2044 | / | Fraction slash | 0925 |
| U+204A | ⁊ | Tironian et sign | 0926 |
| Code | Glyph | Description | # |

=== Whitespace ===
Unicode characters with property White_Space=yes (Note: White_Space is a binary Unicode property.)
| Name | Code point | | Width box | May break? | In IDN? | Script | Block | General category | Notes |
|---|---|---|---|---|---|---|---|---|---|
| character tabulation | U+0009 | 9 | | Yes | No | Common | Basic Latin | Other, control | HT, Horizontal Tab. HTML/XML named entity: &Tab;, LaTeX: \tab, C escape: \t |
| line feed | U+000A | 10 | Is a line-break | | | Common | Basic Latin | Other, control | LF, Line feed. HTML/XML named entity: &NewLine;, C escape: \n |
| line tabulation | U+000B | 11 | Is a line-break | | | Common | Basic Latin | Other, control | VT, Vertical Tab. C escape: \v |
| form feed | U+000C | 12 | Is a line-break | | | Common | Basic Latin | Other, control | FF, Form feed. C escape: \f |
| carriage return | U+000D | 13 | Is a line-break | | | Common | Basic Latin | Other, control | CR, Carriage return. C escape: \r |
| space | U+0020 | 32 | | Yes | No | Common | Basic Latin | Separator, space | Most common (normal ASCII space). LaTeX: \ |
| next line | U+0085 | 133 | Is a line-break | | | Common | Latin-1; Supplement | Other, control | NEL, Next line. LaTeX: \\ |
| no-break space | U+00A0 | 160 | | No | No | Common | Latin-1; Supplement | Separator, space | Non-breaking space: identical to U+0020, but not a point at which a line may be broken. HTML/XML named entity: &nbsp;, &NonBreakingSpace;, LaTeX: ~ |
| ogham space mark | U+1680 | 5760 | | Yes | No | Ogham | Ogham | Separator, space | Used for interword separation in Ogham text. Normally a vertical line in vertical text or a horizontal line in horizontal text, but may also be a blank space in "stemless" fonts. Requires an Ogham font. |
| en quad | U+2000 | 8192 | | Yes | No | Common | General; Punctuation | Separator, space | Width of one en. U+2002 is canonically equivalent to this character; U+2002 is preferred. |
| em quad | U+2001 | 8193 | | Yes | No | Common | General; Punctuation | Separator, space | Also known as "mutton quad". Width of one em. U+2003 is canonically equivalent to this character; U+2003 is preferred. |
| en space | U+2002 | 8194 | | Yes | No | Common | General; Punctuation | Separator, space | Also known as "nut". Width of one en. U+2000 En Quad is canonically equivalent to this character; U+2002 is preferred. HTML/XML named entity: &ensp;, LaTeX: \enspace (the LaTeX en space is a no-break space) |
| em space | U+2003 | 8195 | | Yes | No | Common | General; Punctuation | Separator, space | Also known as "mutton". Width of one em. U+2001 Em Quad is canonically equivalent to this character; U+2003 is preferred. HTML/XML named entity: &emsp;, LaTeX: \quad |
| three-per-em space | U+2004 | 8196 | | Yes | No | Common | General; Punctuation | Separator, space | Also known as "thick space". One third of an em wide. HTML/XML named entity: &emsp13;, LaTeX: \; (the LaTeX thick space is a no-break space) |
| four-per-em space | U+2005 | 8197 | | Yes | No | Common | General; Punctuation | Separator, space | Also known as "mid space". One fourth of an em wide. HTML/XML named entity: &emsp14; |
| six-per-em space | U+2006 | 8198 | | Yes | No | Common | General; Punctuation | Separator, space | One sixth of an em wide. In computer typography, sometimes equated to U+2009. |
| figure space | U+2007 | 8199 | | No | No | Common | General; Punctuation | Separator, space | Figure space. In fonts with monospaced digits, equal to the width of one digit. HTML/XML named entity: &numsp; |
| punctuation space | U+2008 | 8200 | | Yes | No | Common | General; Punctuation | Separator, space | As wide as the narrow punctuation in a font, i.e. the advance width of the period or comma. HTML/XML named entity: &puncsp; |
| thin space | U+2009 | 8201 | | Yes | No | Common | General; Punctuation | Separator, space | Thin space; one-fifth (sometimes one-sixth) of an em wide. Recommended for use as a thousands separator for measures made with SI units. Unlike U+2002 to U+2008, its width may get adjusted in typesetting. HTML/XML named entity: &thinsp;, &ThinSpace;, LaTeX: \, (the LaTeX thin space is a no-break space) |
| hair space | U+200A | 8202 | | Yes | No | Common | General; Punctuation | Separator, space | Thinner than a thin space. HTML/XML named entity: &hairsp;, &VeryThinSpace; |
| line separator | U+2028 | 8232 | Is a line-break | | | Common | General; Punctuation | Separator, line | |
| paragraph separator | U+2029 | 8233 | Is a line-break | | | Common | General; Punctuation | Separator, paragraph | |
| narrow no-break space | U+202F | 8239 | | No | No | Common | General; Punctuation | Separator, space | Narrow no-break space. Similar in function to U+00A0 No-Break Space. When used with Mongolian, its width is usually one third of the normal space; in other context, its width sometimes resembles that of the Thin Space (U+2009). LaTeX: \, |
| medium mathematical space | U+205F | 8287 | | Yes | No | Common | General; Punctuation | Separator, space | MMSP. Used in mathematical formulae. Four-eighteenths of an em. In mathematical typography, the widths of spaces are usually given in integral multiples of an eighteenth of an em, and 4/18 em may be used in several situations, for example between the a and the + and between the + and the b in the expression a + b. HTML/XML named entity: &MediumSpace;, LaTeX: \: (the LaTeX medium space is a no-break space) |
| ideographic space | U+3000 | 12288 | | Yes | No | Common | CJK Symbols and Punctuation | Separator, space | As wide as a CJK character cell (fullwidth). Used, for example, in tai tou. |

Related Unicode characters with property White_Space=no
| Name | Code point | | Width box | May break? | In IDN? | Script | Block | General category | Notes |
|---|---|---|---|---|---|---|---|---|---|
| mongolian vowel separator | U+180E | 6158 | ᠎ | Yes | No | Mongolian | Mongolian | Other, Format | MVS. A narrow space character, used in Mongolian to cause the final two characters of a word to take on different shapes. It is no longer classified as space character (i.e. in Zs category) in Unicode 6.3.0, even though it was in previous versions of the standard. |
| zero width space | U+200B | 8203 | | Yes | No | Common | General; Punctuation | Other, Format | ZWSP, zero-width space. Used to indicate word boundaries to text processing systems when using scripts that do not use explicit spacing. It is similar to the soft hyphen, with the difference that the latter is used to indicate syllable boundaries, and should display a visible hyphen when the line breaks at it. HTML/XML named entity: &ZeroWidthSpace; (Note: Although &ZeroWidthSpace; is one HTML5 named entity for U+200B, the additional names NegativeMediumSpace, NegativeThickSpace, NegativeThinSpace and NegativeVeryThinSpace (which are names used in the Wolfram Language for negative-advance spaces, which it maps to the Private Use Area) are also defined by HTML5 as aliases for U+200B (e.g. &NegativeMediumSpace;).) |
| zero width non-joiner | U+200C | 8204 | ‌ | Yes | Context-dependent | Inherited | General; Punctuation | Other, Format | ZWNJ, zero-width non-joiner. When placed between two characters that would otherwise be connected, a ZWNJ causes them to be printed in their final and initial forms, respectively. HTML/XML named entity: &zwnj; |
| zero width joiner | U+200D | 8205 | ‍ | Yes | Context-dependent | Inherited | General; Punctuation | Other, Format | ZWJ, zero-width joiner. When placed between two characters that would otherwise not be connected, a ZWJ causes them to be printed in their connected forms. Can also be used to display joining forms in isolation. Depending on whether a ligature or conjunct is expected by default, can either induce (as in emoji and in Sinhala) or suppress (as in Devanagari) substitution with a single glyph, whilst still permitting use of individual joining forms (unlike ZWNJ). HTML/XML named entity: &zwj; |
| word joiner | U+2060 | 8288 | | No | No | Common | General; Punctuation | Other, Format | WJ, word joiner. Similar to U+200B, but not a point at which a line may be broken. HTML/XML named entity: &NoBreak; |
| zero width non-breaking space | U+FEFF | 65279 | | No | No | Common | Arabic; Presentation; Forms-B | Other, Format | Zero-width non-breaking space. Used primarily as a Byte Order Mark. Use as an indication of non-breaking is deprecated as of Unicode 3.2; see U+2060 instead. |

=== Dash ===
| Code | | Name |
|---|---|---|
| U+002D | - | hyphen-minus |
| U+058A | ֊ | Armenian hyphen |
| U+05BE | ־ | Hebrew punctuation maqaf |
| U+1400 | ᐀ | Canadian syllabics hyphen |
| U+1806 | ᠆ | MONGOLIAN TODO SOFT HYPHEN |
| U+2010 | ‐ | hyphen |
| U+2011 | ‑ | non-breaking hyphen |
| U+2012 | ‒ | figure dash |
| U+2013 | – | en dash |
| U+2014 | — | em dash |
| U+2015 | ― | horizontal bar |
| U+2053 | ⁓ | swung dash |
| U+207B | ⁻ | superscript minus |
| U+208B | ₋ | subscript minus |
| U+2212 | − | minus sign |
| U+2E17 | ⸗ | DOUBLE OBLIQUE HYPHEN |
| U+2E1A | ⸚ | HYPHEN WITH DIAERESIS |
| U+2E3A | ⸺ | two-em dash |
| U+2E3B | ⸻ | three-em dash |
| U+2E40 | ⹀ | DOUBLE HYPHEN |
| U+2E5D | ⹝ | OBLIQUE HYPHEN |
| U+301C | 〜 | WAVE DASH |
| U+3030 | 〰 | wavy dash |
| U+30A0 | ゠ | KATAKANA-HIRAGANA DOUBLE HYPHEN |
| U+FE31 | ︱ | PRESENTATION FORM FOR VERTICAL EM DASH |
| U+FE32 | ︲ | PRESENTATION FORM FOR VERTICAL EN DASH |
| U+FE58 | ﹘ | SMALL EM DASH |
| U+FE63 | ﹣ | SMALL HYPHEN-MINUS |
| U+FF0D | － | FULLWIDTH HYPHEN-MINUS |
| U+10D6E | 𐵮 | GARAY HYPHEN |

== Notational systems ==
=== Braille ===
Braille Patterns^{[1]} Official Unicode Consortium code chart (PDF)
| | 0 | 1 | 2 | 3 | 4 | 5 | 6 | 7 | 8 | 9 | A | B | C | D | E | F |
| U+280x | ⠀ | ⠁ | ⠂ | ⠃ | ⠄ | ⠅ | ⠆ | ⠇ | ⠈ | ⠉ | ⠊ | ⠋ | ⠌ | ⠍ | ⠎ | ⠏ |
| U+281x | ⠐ | ⠑ | ⠒ | ⠓ | ⠔ | ⠕ | ⠖ | ⠗ | ⠘ | ⠙ | ⠚ | ⠛ | ⠜ | ⠝ | ⠞ | ⠟ |
| U+282x | ⠠ | ⠡ | ⠢ | ⠣ | ⠤ | ⠥ | ⠦ | ⠧ | ⠨ | ⠩ | ⠪ | ⠫ | ⠬ | ⠭ | ⠮ | ⠯ |
| U+283x | ⠰ | ⠱ | ⠲ | ⠳ | ⠴ | ⠵ | ⠶ | ⠷ | ⠸ | ⠹ | ⠺ | ⠻ | ⠼ | ⠽ | ⠾ | ⠿ |
(end of 6-dot cell patterns)
| U+284x | ⡀ | ⡁ | ⡂ | ⡃ | ⡄ | ⡅ | ⡆ | ⡇ | ⡈ | ⡉ | ⡊ | ⡋ | ⡌ | ⡍ | ⡎ | ⡏ |
| U+285x | ⡐ | ⡑ | ⡒ | ⡓ | ⡔ | ⡕ | ⡖ | ⡗ | ⡘ | ⡙ | ⡚ | ⡛ | ⡜ | ⡝ | ⡞ | ⡟ |
| U+286x | ⡠ | ⡡ | ⡢ | ⡣ | ⡤ | ⡥ | ⡦ | ⡧ | ⡨ | ⡩ | ⡪ | ⡫ | ⡬ | ⡭ | ⡮ | ⡯ |
| U+287x | ⡰ | ⡱ | ⡲ | ⡳ | ⡴ | ⡵ | ⡶ | ⡷ | ⡸ | ⡹ | ⡺ | ⡻ | ⡼ | ⡽ | ⡾ | ⡿ |
| U+288x | ⢀ | ⢁ | ⢂ | ⢃ | ⢄ | ⢅ | ⢆ | ⢇ | ⢈ | ⢉ | ⢊ | ⢋ | ⢌ | ⢍ | ⢎ | ⢏ |
| U+289x | ⢐ | ⢑ | ⢒ | ⢓ | ⢔ | ⢕ | ⢖ | ⢗ | ⢘ | ⢙ | ⢚ | ⢛ | ⢜ | ⢝ | ⢞ | ⢟ |
| U+28Ax | ⢠ | ⢡ | ⢢ | ⢣ | ⢤ | ⢥ | ⢦ | ⢧ | ⢨ | ⢩ | ⢪ | ⢫ | ⢬ | ⢭ | ⢮ | ⢯ |
| U+28Bx | ⢰ | ⢱ | ⢲ | ⢳ | ⢴ | ⢵ | ⢶ | ⢷ | ⢸ | ⢹ | ⢺ | ⢻ | ⢼ | ⢽ | ⢾ | ⢿ |
| U+28Cx | ⣀ | ⣁ | ⣂ | ⣃ | ⣄ | ⣅ | ⣆ | ⣇ | ⣈ | ⣉ | ⣊ | ⣋ | ⣌ | ⣍ | ⣎ | ⣏ |
| U+28Dx | ⣐ | ⣑ | ⣒ | ⣓ | ⣔ | ⣕ | ⣖ | ⣗ | ⣘ | ⣙ | ⣚ | ⣛ | ⣜ | ⣝ | ⣞ | ⣟ |
| U+28Ex | ⣠ | ⣡ | ⣢ | ⣣ | ⣤ | ⣥ | ⣦ | ⣧ | ⣨ | ⣩ | ⣪ | ⣫ | ⣬ | ⣭ | ⣮ | ⣯ |
| U+28Fx | ⣰ | ⣱ | ⣲ | ⣳ | ⣴ | ⣵ | ⣶ | ⣷ | ⣸ | ⣹ | ⣺ | ⣻ | ⣼ | ⣽ | ⣾ | ⣿ |
Notes 1.As of Unicode version 18.0

=== Music ===
==== Musical symbols ====
Musical Symbols^{[1]} Official Unicode Consortium code chart (PDF)
| | 0 | 1 | 2 | 3 | 4 | 5 | 6 | 7 | 8 | 9 | A | B | C | D | E | F |
| U+1D10x | 𝄀 | 𝄁 | 𝄂 | 𝄃 | 𝄄 | 𝄅 | 𝄆 | 𝄇 | 𝄈 | 𝄉 | 𝄊 | 𝄋 | 𝄌 | 𝄍 | 𝄎 | 𝄏 |
| U+1D11x | 𝄐 | 𝄑 | 𝄒 | 𝄓 | 𝄔 | 𝄕 | 𝄖 | 𝄗 | 𝄘 | 𝄙 | 𝄚 | 𝄛 | 𝄜 | 𝄝 | 𝄞 | 𝄟 |
| U+1D12x | 𝄠 | 𝄡 | 𝄢 | 𝄣 | 𝄤 | 𝄥 | 𝄦 | 𝄧 | 𝄨 | 𝄩 | 𝄪 | 𝄫 | 𝄬 | 𝄭 | 𝄮 | 𝄯 |
| U+1D13x | 𝄰 | 𝄱 | 𝄲 | 𝄳 | 𝄴 | 𝄵 | 𝄶 | 𝄷 | 𝄸 | 𝄹 | 𝄺 | 𝄻 | 𝄼 | 𝄽 | 𝄾 | 𝄿 |
| U+1D14x | 𝅀 | 𝅁 | 𝅂 | 𝅃 | 𝅄 | 𝅅 | 𝅆 | 𝅇 | 𝅈 | 𝅉 | 𝅊 | 𝅋 | 𝅌 | 𝅍 | 𝅎 | 𝅏 |
| U+1D15x | 𝅐 | 𝅑 | 𝅒 | 𝅓 | 𝅔 | 𝅕 | 𝅖 | 𝅗 | 𝅘 | NULL; NOTE; HEAD | 𝅚 | 𝅛 | 𝅜 | 𝅝 | 𝅗𝅥 | 𝅘𝅥 |
| U+1D16x | 𝅘𝅥𝅮 | 𝅘𝅥𝅯 | 𝅘𝅥𝅰 | 𝅘𝅥𝅱 | 𝅘𝅥𝅲 | 𝅥 | 𝅦 | 𝅧 | 𝅨 | 𝅩 | 𝅪 | 𝅫 | 𝅬 | 𝅭 | 𝅮 | 𝅯 |
| U+1D17x | 𝅰 | 𝅱 | 𝅲 | BEGIN; BEAM | END; BEAM | BEGIN; TIE | END; TIE | BEGIN; SLUR | END; SLUR | BEGIN; PHR. | END; PHR. | 𝅻 | 𝅼 | 𝅽 | 𝅾 | 𝅿 |
| U+1D18x | 𝆀 | 𝆁 | 𝆂 | 𝆃 | 𝆄 | 𝆅 | 𝆆 | 𝆇 | 𝆈 | 𝆉 | 𝆊 | 𝆋 | 𝆌 | 𝆍 | 𝆎 | 𝆏 |
| U+1D19x | 𝆐 | 𝆑 | 𝆒 | 𝆓 | 𝆔 | 𝆕 | 𝆖 | 𝆗 | 𝆘 | 𝆙 | 𝆚 | 𝆛 | 𝆜 | 𝆝 | 𝆞 | 𝆟 |
| U+1D1Ax | 𝆠 | 𝆡 | 𝆢 | 𝆣 | 𝆤 | 𝆥 | 𝆦 | 𝆧 | 𝆨 | 𝆩 | 𝆪 | 𝆫 | 𝆬 | 𝆭 | 𝆮 | 𝆯 |
| U+1D1Bx | 𝆰 | 𝆱 | 𝆲 | 𝆳 | 𝆴 | 𝆵 | 𝆶 | 𝆷 | 𝆸 | 𝆹 | 𝆺 | 𝆹𝅥 | 𝆺𝅥 | 𝆹𝅥𝅮 | 𝆺𝅥𝅮 | 𝆹𝅥𝅯 |
| U+1D1Cx | 𝆺𝅥𝅯 | 𝇁 | 𝇂 | 𝇃 | 𝇄 | 𝇅 | 𝇆 | 𝇇 | 𝇈 | 𝇉 | 𝇊 | 𝇋 | 𝇌 | 𝇍 | 𝇎 | 𝇏 |
| U+1D1Dx | 𝇐 | 𝇑 | 𝇒 | 𝇓 | 𝇔 | 𝇕 | 𝇖 | 𝇗 | 𝇘 | 𝇙 | 𝇚 | 𝇛 | 𝇜 | 𝇝 | 𝇞 | 𝇟 |
| U+1D1Ex | 𝇠 | 𝇡 | 𝇢 | 𝇣 | 𝇤 | 𝇥 | 𝇦 | 𝇧 | 𝇨 | 𝇩 | 𝇪 | 𝇫 | 𝇬 | 𝇭 | 𝇮 | 𝇯 |
| U+1D1Fx | 𝇰 | 𝇱 | 𝇲 | 𝇳 | 𝇴 | 𝇵 | 𝇶 | 𝇷 | 𝇸 | 𝇹 | 𝇺 | 𝇻 | 𝇼 | 𝇽 | 𝇾 | 𝇿 |
Notes 1.As of Unicode version 18.0

==== Other musical symbols ====
- Musical Symbols Supplement (Unicode block)
- Byzantine Musical Symbols (Unicode block)
- Ancient Greek Musical Notation (Unicode block)
- Znamenny Musical Notation (Unicode block)

=== Shorthand ===
- Duployan (Unicode block)
- Shorthand Format Controls (Unicode block)

=== Sutton SignWriting ===
- Sutton SignWriting: Sutton SignWriting (Unicode block)

== Symbols ==
=== Currency Symbols ===
Currency Symbols^{[1]}^{[2]} Official Unicode Consortium code chart (PDF)
| | 0 | 1 | 2 | 3 | 4 | 5 | 6 | 7 | 8 | 9 | A | B | C | D | E | F |
| U+20Ax | ₠ | ₡ | ₢ | ₣ | ₤ | ₥ | ₦ | ₧ | ₨ | ₩ | ₪ | ₫ | € | ₭ | ₮ | ₯ |
| U+20Bx | ₰ | ₱ | ₲ | ₳ | ₴ | ₵ | ₶ | ₷ | ₸ | ₹ | ₺ | ₻ | ₼ | ₽ | ₾ | ₿ |
| U+20Cx | ⃀ | ⃁ | ⃂ | ⃃ | ⃄ | | | | | | | | | | | |
Notes 1.As of Unicode version 18.0 2.Grey areas indicate non-assigned code points

=== Letterlike Symbols ===
Letterlike Symbols^{[1]} Official Unicode Consortium code chart (PDF)
| | 0 | 1 | 2 | 3 | 4 | 5 | 6 | 7 | 8 | 9 | A | B | C | D | E | F |
| U+210x | ℀ | ℁ | ℂ | ℃ | ℄ | ℅ | ℆ | ℇ | ℈ | ℉ | ℊ | ℋ | ℌ | ℍ | ℎ | ℏ |
| U+211x | ℐ | ℑ | ℒ | ℓ | ℔ | ℕ | № | ℗ | ℘ | ℙ | ℚ | ℛ | ℜ | ℝ | ℞ | ℟ |
| U+212x | ℠ | ℡ | ™ | ℣ | ℤ | ℥ | Ω | ℧ | ℨ | ℩ | K | Å | ℬ | ℭ | ℮ | ℯ |
| U+213x | ℰ | ℱ | Ⅎ | ℳ | ℴ | ℵ | ℶ | ℷ | ℸ | ℹ | ℺ | ℻ | ℼ | ℽ | ℾ | ℿ |
| U+214x | ⅀ | ⅁ | ⅂ | ⅃ | ⅄ | ⅅ | ⅆ | ⅇ | ⅈ | ⅉ | ⅊ | ⅋ | ⅌ | ⅍ | ⅎ | ⅏ |
Notes 1.As of Unicode version 18.0

=== Superscripts and Subscripts ===
Superscripts and Subscripts^{[1]}^{[2]}^{[3]} Official Unicode Consortium code chart (PDF)
| | 0 | 1 | 2 | 3 | 4 | 5 | 6 | 7 | 8 | 9 | A | B | C | D | E | F |
| U+207x | ⁰ | ⁱ | | | ⁴ | ⁵ | ⁶ | ⁷ | ⁸ | ⁹ | ⁺ | ⁻ | ⁼ | ⁽ | ⁾ | ⁿ |
| U+208x | ₀ | ₁ | ₂ | ₃ | ₄ | ₅ | ₆ | ₇ | ₈ | ₉ | ₊ | ₋ | ₌ | ₍ | ₎ | ₏ |
| U+209x | ₐ | ₑ | ₒ | ₓ | ₔ | ₕ | ₖ | ₗ | ₘ | ₙ | ₚ | ₛ | ₜ | ₝ | ₞ | ₟ |
Notes 1.As of Unicode version 18.0 2.Grey areas indicate non-assigned code points 3.Refer to the Latin-1 Supplement Unicode block for characters ¹ (U+00B9), ² (U+00B2) and ³ (U+00B3)

=== Mathematical symbols ===
Mathematical Operators^{[1]} Official Unicode Consortium code chart (PDF)
| | 0 | 1 | 2 | 3 | 4 | 5 | 6 | 7 | 8 | 9 | A | B | C | D | E | F |
| U+220x | ∀ | ∁ | ∂ | ∃ | ∄ | ∅ | ∆ | ∇ | ∈ | ∉ | ∊ | ∋ | ∌ | ∍ | ∎ | ∏ |
| U+221x | ∐ | ∑ | − | ∓ | ∔ | ∕ | ∖ | ∗ | ∘ | ∙ | √ | ∛ | ∜ | ∝ | ∞ | ∟ |
| U+222x | ∠ | ∡ | ∢ | ∣ | ∤ | ∥ | ∦ | ∧ | ∨ | ∩ | ∪ | ∫ | ∬ | ∭ | ∮ | ∯ |
| U+223x | ∰ | ∱ | ∲ | ∳ | ∴ | ∵ | ∶ | ∷ | ∸ | ∹ | ∺ | ∻ | ∼ | ∽ | ∾ | ∿ |
| U+224x | ≀ | ≁ | ≂ | ≃ | ≄ | ≅ | ≆ | ≇ | ≈ | ≉ | ≊ | ≋ | ≌ | ≍ | ≎ | ≏ |
| U+225x | ≐ | ≑ | ≒ | ≓ | ≔ | ≕ | ≖ | ≗ | ≘ | ≙ | ≚ | ≛ | ≜ | ≝ | ≞ | ≟ |
| U+226x | ≠ | ≡ | ≢ | ≣ | ≤ | ≥ | ≦ | ≧ | ≨ | ≩ | ≪ | ≫ | ≬ | ≭ | ≮ | ≯ |
| U+227x | ≰ | ≱ | ≲ | ≳ | ≴ | ≵ | ≶ | ≷ | ≸ | ≹ | ≺ | ≻ | ≼ | ≽ | ≾ | ≿ |
| U+228x | ⊀ | ⊁ | ⊂ | ⊃ | ⊄ | ⊅ | ⊆ | ⊇ | ⊈ | ⊉ | ⊊ | ⊋ | ⊌ | ⊍ | ⊎ | ⊏ |
| U+229x | ⊐ | ⊑ | ⊒ | ⊓ | ⊔ | ⊕ | ⊖ | ⊗ | ⊘ | ⊙ | ⊚ | ⊛ | ⊜ | ⊝ | ⊞ | ⊟ |
| U+22Ax | ⊠ | ⊡ | ⊢ | ⊣ | ⊤ | ⊥ | ⊦ | ⊧ | ⊨ | ⊩ | ⊪ | ⊫ | ⊬ | ⊭ | ⊮ | ⊯ |
| U+22Bx | ⊰ | ⊱ | ⊲ | ⊳ | ⊴ | ⊵ | ⊶ | ⊷ | ⊸ | ⊹ | ⊺ | ⊻ | ⊼ | ⊽ | ⊾ | ⊿ |
| U+22Cx | ⋀ | ⋁ | ⋂ | ⋃ | ⋄ | ⋅ | ⋆ | ⋇ | ⋈ | ⋉ | ⋊ | ⋋ | ⋌ | ⋍ | ⋎ | ⋏ |
| U+22Dx | ⋐ | ⋑ | ⋒ | ⋓ | ⋔ | ⋕ | ⋖ | ⋗ | ⋘ | ⋙ | ⋚ | ⋛ | ⋜ | ⋝ | ⋞ | ⋟ |
| U+22Ex | ⋠ | ⋡ | ⋢ | ⋣ | ⋤ | ⋥ | ⋦ | ⋧ | ⋨ | ⋩ | ⋪ | ⋫ | ⋬ | ⋭ | ⋮ | ⋯ |
| U+22Fx | ⋰ | ⋱ | ⋲ | ⋳ | ⋴ | ⋵ | ⋶ | ⋷ | ⋸ | ⋹ | ⋺ | ⋻ | ⋼ | ⋽ | ⋾ | ⋿ |
Notes 1.As of Unicode version 18.0

- Supplemental Mathematical Operators (Unicode block)
- Miscellaneous Mathematical Symbols-A (Unicode block)
- Miscellaneous Mathematical Symbols-B (Unicode block)
- Mathematical Alphanumeric Symbols: Mathematical Alphanumeric Symbols (Unicode block)

=== Number Forms ===
Number Forms^{[1]}^{[2]} Official Unicode Consortium code chart (PDF)
| | 0 | 1 | 2 | 3 | 4 | 5 | 6 | 7 | 8 | 9 | A | B | C | D | E | F |
| U+215x | ⅐ | ⅑ | ⅒ | ⅓ | ⅔ | ⅕ | ⅖ | ⅗ | ⅘ | ⅙ | ⅚ | ⅛ | ⅜ | ⅝ | ⅞ | ⅟ |
| U+216x | Ⅰ | Ⅱ | Ⅲ | Ⅳ | Ⅴ | Ⅵ | Ⅶ | Ⅷ | Ⅸ | Ⅹ | Ⅺ | Ⅻ | Ⅼ | Ⅽ | Ⅾ | Ⅿ |
| U+217x | ⅰ | ⅱ | ⅲ | ⅳ | ⅴ | ⅵ | ⅶ | ⅷ | ⅸ | ⅹ | ⅺ | ⅻ | ⅼ | ⅽ | ⅾ | ⅿ |
| U+218x | ↀ | ↁ | ↂ | Ↄ | ↄ | ↅ | ↆ | ↇ | ↈ | ↉ | ↊ | ↋ | | | | |
Notes 1.As of Unicode version 18.0 2.Grey areas indicate non-assigned code points

=== Numerals ===
Counting Rod Numerals^{[1]}^{[2]} Official Unicode Consortium code chart (PDF)
| | 0 | 1 | 2 | 3 | 4 | 5 | 6 | 7 | 8 | 9 | A | B | C | D | E | F |
| U+1D36x | 𝍠 | 𝍡 | 𝍢 | 𝍣 | 𝍤 | 𝍥 | 𝍦 | 𝍧 | 𝍨 | 𝍩 | 𝍪 | 𝍫 | 𝍬 | 𝍭 | 𝍮 | 𝍯 |
| U+1D37x | 𝍰 | 𝍱 | 𝍲 | 𝍳 | 𝍴 | 𝍵 | 𝍶 | 𝍷 | 𝍸 | | | | | | | |
Notes 1.As of Unicode version 18.0 2.Grey areas indicate non-assigned code points

Indic Siyaq Numbers^{[1]}^{[2]} Official Unicode Consortium code chart (PDF)
| | 0 | 1 | 2 | 3 | 4 | 5 | 6 | 7 | 8 | 9 | A | B | C | D | E | F |
| U+1EC7x | | 𞱱 | 𞱲 | 𞱳 | 𞱴 | 𞱵 | 𞱶 | 𞱷 | 𞱸 | 𞱹 | 𞱺 | 𞱻 | 𞱼 | 𞱽 | 𞱾 | 𞱿 |
| U+1EC8x | 𞲀 | 𞲁 | 𞲂 | 𞲃 | 𞲄 | 𞲅 | 𞲆 | 𞲇 | 𞲈 | 𞲉 | 𞲊 | 𞲋 | 𞲌 | 𞲍 | 𞲎 | 𞲏 |
| U+1EC9x | 𞲐 | 𞲑 | 𞲒 | 𞲓 | 𞲔 | 𞲕 | 𞲖 | 𞲗 | 𞲘 | 𞲙 | 𞲚 | 𞲛 | 𞲜 | 𞲝 | 𞲞 | 𞲟 |
| U+1ECAx | 𞲠 | 𞲡 | 𞲢 | 𞲣 | 𞲤 | 𞲥 | 𞲦 | 𞲧 | 𞲨 | 𞲩 | 𞲪 | 𞲫 | 𞲬 | 𞲭 | 𞲮 | 𞲯 |
| U+1ECBx | 𞲰 | 𞲱 | 𞲲 | 𞲳 | 𞲴 | | | | | | | | | | | |
Notes 1.As of Unicode version 18.0 2.Grey areas indicate non-assigned code points

Coptic Epact Numbers^{[1]}^{[2]} Official Unicode Consortium code chart (PDF)
| | 0 | 1 | 2 | 3 | 4 | 5 | 6 | 7 | 8 | 9 | A | B | C | D | E | F |
| U+102Ex | 𐋠 | 𐋡 | 𐋢 | 𐋣 | 𐋤 | 𐋥 | 𐋦 | 𐋧 | 𐋨 | 𐋩 | 𐋪 | 𐋫 | 𐋬 | 𐋭 | 𐋮 | 𐋯 |
| U+102Fx | 𐋰 | 𐋱 | 𐋲 | 𐋳 | 𐋴 | 𐋵 | 𐋶 | 𐋷 | 𐋸 | 𐋹 | 𐋺 | 𐋻 | | | | |
Notes 1.As of Unicode version 18.0 2.Grey areas indicate non-assigned code points

Rumi Numeral Symbols^{[1]}^{[2]} Official Unicode Consortium code chart (PDF)
| | 0 | 1 | 2 | 3 | 4 | 5 | 6 | 7 | 8 | 9 | A | B | C | D | E | F |
| U+10E6x | 𐹠 | 𐹡 | 𐹢 | 𐹣 | 𐹤 | 𐹥 | 𐹦 | 𐹧 | 𐹨 | 𐹩 | 𐹪 | 𐹫 | 𐹬 | 𐹭 | 𐹮 | 𐹯 |
| U+10E7x | 𐹰 | 𐹱 | 𐹲 | 𐹳 | 𐹴 | 𐹵 | 𐹶 | 𐹷 | 𐹸 | 𐹹 | 𐹺 | 𐹻 | 𐹼 | 𐹽 | 𐹾 | |
Notes 1.As of Unicode version 18.0 2.Grey area indicates non-assigned code point

Indic Siyaq Numbers^{[1]}^{[2]} Official Unicode Consortium code chart (PDF)
| | 0 | 1 | 2 | 3 | 4 | 5 | 6 | 7 | 8 | 9 | A | B | C | D | E | F |
| U+1EC7x | | 𞱱 | 𞱲 | 𞱳 | 𞱴 | 𞱵 | 𞱶 | 𞱷 | 𞱸 | 𞱹 | 𞱺 | 𞱻 | 𞱼 | 𞱽 | 𞱾 | 𞱿 |
| U+1EC8x | 𞲀 | 𞲁 | 𞲂 | 𞲃 | 𞲄 | 𞲅 | 𞲆 | 𞲇 | 𞲈 | 𞲉 | 𞲊 | 𞲋 | 𞲌 | 𞲍 | 𞲎 | 𞲏 |
| U+1EC9x | 𞲐 | 𞲑 | 𞲒 | 𞲓 | 𞲔 | 𞲕 | 𞲖 | 𞲗 | 𞲘 | 𞲙 | 𞲚 | 𞲛 | 𞲜 | 𞲝 | 𞲞 | 𞲟 |
| U+1ECAx | 𞲠 | 𞲡 | 𞲢 | 𞲣 | 𞲤 | 𞲥 | 𞲦 | 𞲧 | 𞲨 | 𞲩 | 𞲪 | 𞲫 | 𞲬 | 𞲭 | 𞲮 | 𞲯 |
| U+1ECBx | 𞲰 | 𞲱 | 𞲲 | 𞲳 | 𞲴 | | | | | | | | | | | |
Notes 1.As of Unicode version 18.0 2.Grey areas indicate non-assigned code points

Ottoman Siyaq Numbers^{[1]}^{[2]} Official Unicode Consortium code chart (PDF)
| | 0 | 1 | 2 | 3 | 4 | 5 | 6 | 7 | 8 | 9 | A | B | C | D | E | F |
| U+1ED0x | | 𞴁 | 𞴂 | 𞴃 | 𞴄 | 𞴅 | 𞴆 | 𞴇 | 𞴈 | 𞴉 | 𞴊 | 𞴋 | 𞴌 | 𞴍 | 𞴎 | 𞴏 |
| U+1ED1x | 𞴐 | 𞴑 | 𞴒 | 𞴓 | 𞴔 | 𞴕 | 𞴖 | 𞴗 | 𞴘 | 𞴙 | 𞴚 | 𞴛 | 𞴜 | 𞴝 | 𞴞 | 𞴟 |
| U+1ED2x | 𞴠 | 𞴡 | 𞴢 | 𞴣 | 𞴤 | 𞴥 | 𞴦 | 𞴧 | 𞴨 | 𞴩 | 𞴪 | 𞴫 | 𞴬 | 𞴭 | 𞴮 | 𞴯 |
| U+1ED3x | 𞴰 | 𞴱 | 𞴲 | 𞴳 | 𞴴 | 𞴵 | 𞴶 | 𞴷 | 𞴸 | 𞴹 | 𞴺 | 𞴻 | 𞴼 | 𞴽 | | |
| U+1ED4x | | | | | | | | | | | | | | | | |
Notes 1.As of Unicode version 18.0 2.Grey areas indicate non-assigned code points

Common Indic Number Forms^{[1]}^{[2]} Official Unicode Consortium code chart (PDF)
| | 0 | 1 | 2 | 3 | 4 | 5 | 6 | 7 | 8 | 9 | A | B | C | D | E | F |
| U+A83x | ꠰ | ꠱ | ꠲ | ꠳ | ꠴ | ꠵ | ꠶ | ꠷ | ꠸ | ꠹ | | | | | | |
Notes 1.As of Unicode version 18.0 2.Grey areas indicate non-assigned code points

Sinhala Archaic Numbers^{[1]}^{[2]} Official Unicode Consortium code chart (PDF)
| | 0 | 1 | 2 | 3 | 4 | 5 | 6 | 7 | 8 | 9 | A | B | C | D | E | F |
| U+111Ex | | 𑇡 | 𑇢 | 𑇣 | 𑇤 | 𑇥 | 𑇦 | 𑇧 | 𑇨 | 𑇩 | 𑇪 | 𑇫 | 𑇬 | 𑇭 | 𑇮 | 𑇯 |
| U+111Fx | 𑇰 | 𑇱 | 𑇲 | 𑇳 | 𑇴 | | | | | | | | | | | |
Notes 1.As of Unicode version 18.0 2.Grey areas indicate non-assigned code points

=== Arrows ===
Arrows^{[1]} Official Unicode Consortium code chart (PDF)
| | 0 | 1 | 2 | 3 | 4 | 5 | 6 | 7 | 8 | 9 | A | B | C | D | E | F |
| U+219x | ← | ↑ | → | ↓ | ↔ | ↕ | ↖ | ↗ | ↘ | ↙ | ↚ | ↛ | ↜ | ↝ | ↞ | ↟ |
| U+21Ax | ↠ | ↡ | ↢ | ↣ | ↤ | ↥ | ↦ | ↧ | ↨ | ↩ | ↪ | ↫ | ↬ | ↭ | ↮ | ↯ |
| U+21Bx | ↰ | ↱ | ↲ | ↳ | ↴ | ↵ | ↶ | ↷ | ↸ | ↹ | ↺ | ↻ | ↼ | ↽ | ↾ | ↿ |
| U+21Cx | ⇀ | ⇁ | ⇂ | ⇃ | ⇄ | ⇅ | ⇆ | ⇇ | ⇈ | ⇉ | ⇊ | ⇋ | ⇌ | ⇍ | ⇎ | ⇏ |
| U+21Dx | ⇐ | ⇑ | ⇒ | ⇓ | ⇔ | ⇕ | ⇖ | ⇗ | ⇘ | ⇙ | ⇚ | ⇛ | ⇜ | ⇝ | ⇞ | ⇟ |
| U+21Ex | ⇠ | ⇡ | ⇢ | ⇣ | ⇤ | ⇥ | ⇦ | ⇧ | ⇨ | ⇩ | ⇪ | ⇫ | ⇬ | ⇭ | ⇮ | ⇯ |
| U+21Fx | ⇰ | ⇱ | ⇲ | ⇳ | ⇴ | ⇵ | ⇶ | ⇷ | ⇸ | ⇹ | ⇺ | ⇻ | ⇼ | ⇽ | ⇾ | ⇿ |
Notes 1.As of Unicode version 18.0

- Miscellaneous Symbols and Arrows (Unicode block)
- Miscellaneous Symbols and Arrows Extended (Unicode block)
- Supplemental Arrows-A (Unicode block)
- Supplemental Arrows-B (Unicode block)
- Supplemental Arrows-C (Unicode block)

=== Enclosed characters ===
==== Enclosed Alphanumerics ====
Enclosed Alphanumerics^{[1]} Official Unicode Consortium code chart (PDF)
| | 0 | 1 | 2 | 3 | 4 | 5 | 6 | 7 | 8 | 9 | A | B | C | D | E | F |
| U+246x | ① | ② | ③ | ④ | ⑤ | ⑥ | ⑦ | ⑧ | ⑨ | ⑩ | ⑪ | ⑫ | ⑬ | ⑭ | ⑮ | ⑯ |
| U+247x | ⑰ | ⑱ | ⑲ | ⑳ | ⑴ | ⑵ | ⑶ | ⑷ | ⑸ | ⑹ | ⑺ | ⑻ | ⑼ | ⑽ | ⑾ | ⑿ |
| U+248x | ⒀ | ⒁ | ⒂ | ⒃ | ⒄ | ⒅ | ⒆ | ⒇ | ⒈ | ⒉ | ⒊ | ⒋ | ⒌ | ⒍ | ⒎ | ⒏ |
| U+249x | ⒐ | ⒑ | ⒒ | ⒓ | ⒔ | ⒕ | ⒖ | ⒗ | ⒘ | ⒙ | ⒚ | ⒛ | ⒜ | ⒝ | ⒞ | ⒟ |
| U+24Ax | ⒠ | ⒡ | ⒢ | ⒣ | ⒤ | ⒥ | ⒦ | ⒧ | ⒨ | ⒩ | ⒪ | ⒫ | ⒬ | ⒭ | ⒮ | ⒯ |
| U+24Bx | ⒰ | ⒱ | ⒲ | ⒳ | ⒴ | ⒵ | Ⓐ | Ⓑ | Ⓒ | Ⓓ | Ⓔ | Ⓕ | Ⓖ | Ⓗ | Ⓘ | Ⓙ |
| U+24Cx | Ⓚ | Ⓛ | Ⓜ | Ⓝ | Ⓞ | Ⓟ | Ⓠ | Ⓡ | Ⓢ | Ⓣ | Ⓤ | Ⓥ | Ⓦ | Ⓧ | Ⓨ | Ⓩ |
| U+24Dx | ⓐ | ⓑ | ⓒ | ⓓ | ⓔ | ⓕ | ⓖ | ⓗ | ⓘ | ⓙ | ⓚ | ⓛ | ⓜ | ⓝ | ⓞ | ⓟ |
| U+24Ex | ⓠ | ⓡ | ⓢ | ⓣ | ⓤ | ⓥ | ⓦ | ⓧ | ⓨ | ⓩ | ⓪ | ⓫ | ⓬ | ⓭ | ⓮ | ⓯ |
| U+24Fx | ⓰ | ⓱ | ⓲ | ⓳ | ⓴ | ⓵ | ⓶ | ⓷ | ⓸ | ⓹ | ⓺ | ⓻ | ⓼ | ⓽ | ⓾ | ⓿ |
Notes 1.As of Unicode version 18.0

Enclosed Alphanumeric Supplement^{[1]}^{[2]} Official Unicode Consortium code chart (PDF)
| | 0 | 1 | 2 | 3 | 4 | 5 | 6 | 7 | 8 | 9 | A | B | C | D | E | F |
| U+1F10x | 🄀 | 🄁 | 🄂 | 🄃 | 🄄 | 🄅 | 🄆 | 🄇 | 🄈 | 🄉 | 🄊 | 🄋 | 🄌 | 🄍 | 🄎 | 🄏 |
| U+1F11x | 🄐 | 🄑 | 🄒 | 🄓 | 🄔 | 🄕 | 🄖 | 🄗 | 🄘 | 🄙 | 🄚 | 🄛 | 🄜 | 🄝 | 🄞 | 🄟 |
| U+1F12x | 🄠 | 🄡 | 🄢 | 🄣 | 🄤 | 🄥 | 🄦 | 🄧 | 🄨 | 🄩 | 🄪 | 🄫 | 🄬 | 🄭 | 🄮 | 🄯 |
| U+1F13x | 🄰 | 🄱 | 🄲 | 🄳 | 🄴 | 🄵 | 🄶 | 🄷 | 🄸 | 🄹 | 🄺 | 🄻 | 🄼 | 🄽 | 🄾 | 🄿 |
| U+1F14x | 🅀 | 🅁 | 🅂 | 🅃 | 🅄 | 🅅 | 🅆 | 🅇 | 🅈 | 🅉 | 🅊 | 🅋 | 🅌 | 🅍 | 🅎 | 🅏 |
| U+1F15x | 🅐 | 🅑 | 🅒 | 🅓 | 🅔 | 🅕 | 🅖 | 🅗 | 🅘 | 🅙 | 🅚 | 🅛 | 🅜 | 🅝 | 🅞 | 🅟 |
| U+1F16x | 🅠 | 🅡 | 🅢 | 🅣 | 🅤 | 🅥 | 🅦 | 🅧 | 🅨 | 🅩 | 🅪 | 🅫 | 🅬 | 🅭 | 🅮 | 🅯 |
| U+1F17x | 🅰 | 🅱 | 🅲 | 🅳 | 🅴 | 🅵 | 🅶 | 🅷 | 🅸 | 🅹 | 🅺 | 🅻 | 🅼 | 🅽 | 🅾 | 🅿 |
| U+1F18x | 🆀 | 🆁 | 🆂 | 🆃 | 🆄 | 🆅 | 🆆 | 🆇 | 🆈 | 🆉 | 🆊 | 🆋 | 🆌 | 🆍 | 🆎 | 🆏 |
| U+1F19x | 🆐 | 🆑 | 🆒 | 🆓 | 🆔 | 🆕 | 🆖 | 🆗 | 🆘 | 🆙 | 🆚 | 🆛 | 🆜 | 🆝 | 🆞 | 🆟 |
| U+1F1Ax | 🆠 | 🆡 | 🆢 | 🆣 | 🆤 | 🆥 | 🆦 | 🆧 | 🆨 | 🆩 | 🆪 | 🆫 | 🆬 | 🆭 | 🆮 | |
| U+1F1Bx | | | | | | | | | | | | | | | | |
| U+1F1Cx | | | | | | | | | | | | | | | | |
| U+1F1Dx | | | | | | | | | | | | | | | | |
| U+1F1Ex | | | | | | | 🇦 | 🇧 | 🇨 | 🇩 | 🇪 | 🇫 | 🇬 | 🇭 | 🇮 | 🇯 |
| U+1F1Fx | 🇰 | 🇱 | 🇲 | 🇳 | 🇴 | 🇵 | 🇶 | 🇷 | 🇸 | 🇹 | 🇺 | 🇻 | 🇼 | 🇽 | 🇾 | 🇿 |
Notes 1.As of Unicode version 18.0 2.Grey areas indicate non-assigned code points

==== Enclosed CJK ====
Enclosed CJK Letters and Months^{[1]}^{[2]} Official Unicode Consortium code chart (PDF)
| | 0 | 1 | 2 | 3 | 4 | 5 | 6 | 7 | 8 | 9 | A | B | C | D | E | F |
| U+320x | ㈀ | ㈁ | ㈂ | ㈃ | ㈄ | ㈅ | ㈆ | ㈇ | ㈈ | ㈉ | ㈊ | ㈋ | ㈌ | ㈍ | ㈎ | ㈏ |
| U+321x | ㈐ | ㈑ | ㈒ | ㈓ | ㈔ | ㈕ | ㈖ | ㈗ | ㈘ | ㈙ | ㈚ | ㈛ | ㈜ | ㈝ | ㈞ | |
| U+322x | ㈠ | ㈡ | ㈢ | ㈣ | ㈤ | ㈥ | ㈦ | ㈧ | ㈨ | ㈩ | ㈪ | ㈫ | ㈬ | ㈭ | ㈮ | ㈯ |
| U+323x | ㈰ | ㈱ | ㈲ | ㈳ | ㈴ | ㈵ | ㈶ | ㈷ | ㈸ | ㈹ | ㈺ | ㈻ | ㈼ | ㈽ | ㈾ | ㈿ |
| U+324x | ㉀ | ㉁ | ㉂ | ㉃ | ㉄ | ㉅ | ㉆ | ㉇ | ㉈ | ㉉ | ㉊ | ㉋ | ㉌ | ㉍ | ㉎ | ㉏ |
| U+325x | ㉐ | ㉑ | ㉒ | ㉓ | ㉔ | ㉕ | ㉖ | ㉗ | ㉘ | ㉙ | ㉚ | ㉛ | ㉜ | ㉝ | ㉞ | ㉟ |
| U+326x | ㉠ | ㉡ | ㉢ | ㉣ | ㉤ | ㉥ | ㉦ | ㉧ | ㉨ | ㉩ | ㉪ | ㉫ | ㉬ | ㉭ | ㉮ | ㉯ |
| U+327x | ㉰ | ㉱ | ㉲ | ㉳ | ㉴ | ㉵ | ㉶ | ㉷ | ㉸ | ㉹ | ㉺ | ㉻ | ㉼ | ㉽ | ㉾ | ㉿ |
| U+328x | ㊀ | ㊁ | ㊂ | ㊃ | ㊄ | ㊅ | ㊆ | ㊇ | ㊈ | ㊉ | ㊊ | ㊋ | ㊌ | ㊍ | ㊎ | ㊏ |
| U+329x | ㊐ | ㊑ | ㊒ | ㊓ | ㊔ | ㊕ | ㊖ | ㊗ | ㊘ | ㊙ | ㊚ | ㊛ | ㊜ | ㊝ | ㊞ | ㊟ |
| U+32Ax | ㊠ | ㊡ | ㊢ | ㊣ | ㊤ | ㊥ | ㊦ | ㊧ | ㊨ | ㊩ | ㊪ | ㊫ | ㊬ | ㊭ | ㊮ | ㊯ |
| U+32Bx | ㊰ | ㊱ | ㊲ | ㊳ | ㊴ | ㊵ | ㊶ | ㊷ | ㊸ | ㊹ | ㊺ | ㊻ | ㊼ | ㊽ | ㊾ | ㊿ |
| U+32Cx | ㋀ | ㋁ | ㋂ | ㋃ | ㋄ | ㋅ | ㋆ | ㋇ | ㋈ | ㋉ | ㋊ | ㋋ | ㋌ | ㋍ | ㋎ | ㋏ |
| U+32Dx | ㋐ | ㋑ | ㋒ | ㋓ | ㋔ | ㋕ | ㋖ | ㋗ | ㋘ | ㋙ | ㋚ | ㋛ | ㋜ | ㋝ | ㋞ | ㋟ |
| U+32Ex | ㋠ | ㋡ | ㋢ | ㋣ | ㋤ | ㋥ | ㋦ | ㋧ | ㋨ | ㋩ | ㋪ | ㋫ | ㋬ | ㋭ | ㋮ | ㋯ |
| U+32Fx | ㋰ | ㋱ | ㋲ | ㋳ | ㋴ | ㋵ | ㋶ | ㋷ | ㋸ | ㋹ | ㋺ | ㋻ | ㋼ | ㋽ | ㋾ | ㋿ |
Notes 1.As of Unicode version 18.0 2.Grey area indicates non-assigned code point

Enclosed Ideographic Supplement^{[1]}^{[2]} Official Unicode Consortium code chart (PDF)
| | 0 | 1 | 2 | 3 | 4 | 5 | 6 | 7 | 8 | 9 | A | B | C | D | E | F |
| U+1F20x | 🈀 | 🈁 | 🈂 | | | | | | | | | | | | | |
| U+1F21x | 🈐 | 🈑 | 🈒 | 🈓 | 🈔 | 🈕 | 🈖 | 🈗 | 🈘 | 🈙 | 🈚 | 🈛 | 🈜 | 🈝 | 🈞 | 🈟 |
| U+1F22x | 🈠 | 🈡 | 🈢 | 🈣 | 🈤 | 🈥 | 🈦 | 🈧 | 🈨 | 🈩 | 🈪 | 🈫 | 🈬 | 🈭 | 🈮 | 🈯 |
| U+1F23x | 🈰 | 🈱 | 🈲 | 🈳 | 🈴 | 🈵 | 🈶 | 🈷 | 🈸 | 🈹 | 🈺 | 🈻 | | | | |
| U+1F24x | 🉀 | 🉁 | 🉂 | 🉃 | 🉄 | 🉅 | 🉆 | 🉇 | 🉈 | | | | | | | |
| U+1F25x | 🉐 | 🉑 | | | | | | | | | | | | | | |
| U+1F26x | 🉠 | 🉡 | 🉢 | 🉣 | 🉤 | 🉥 | | | | | | | | | | |
| U+1F27x | | | | | | | | | | | | | | | | |
| U+1F28x | | | | | | | | | | | | | | | | |
| U+1F29x | | | | | | | | | | | | | | | | |
| U+1F2Ax | | | | | | | | | | | | | | | | |
| U+1F2Bx | | | | | | | | | | | | | | | | |
| U+1F2Cx | | | | | | | | | | | | | | | | |
| U+1F2Dx | | | | | | | | | | | | | | | | |
| U+1F2Ex | | | | | | | | | | | | | | | | |
| U+1F2Fx | | | | | | | | | | | | | | | | |
Notes 1.As of Unicode version 18.0 2.Grey areas indicate non-assigned code points

=== Geometric ===
==== Box Drawing ====
Box Drawing^{[1]} Official Unicode Consortium code chart (PDF)
| | 0 | 1 | 2 | 3 | 4 | 5 | 6 | 7 | 8 | 9 | A | B | C | D | E | F |
| U+250x | ─ | ━ | │ | ┃ | ┄ | ┅ | ┆ | ┇ | ┈ | ┉ | ┊ | ┋ | ┌ | ┍ | ┎ | ┏ |
| U+251x | ┐ | ┑ | ┒ | ┓ | └ | ┕ | ┖ | ┗ | ┘ | ┙ | ┚ | ┛ | ├ | ┝ | ┞ | ┟ |
| U+252x | ┠ | ┡ | ┢ | ┣ | ┤ | ┥ | ┦ | ┧ | ┨ | ┩ | ┪ | ┫ | ┬ | ┭ | ┮ | ┯ |
| U+253x | ┰ | ┱ | ┲ | ┳ | ┴ | ┵ | ┶ | ┷ | ┸ | ┹ | ┺ | ┻ | ┼ | ┽ | ┾ | ┿ |
| U+254x | ╀ | ╁ | ╂ | ╃ | ╄ | ╅ | ╆ | ╇ | ╈ | ╉ | ╊ | ╋ | ╌ | ╍ | ╎ | ╏ |
| U+255x | ═ | ║ | ╒ | ╓ | ╔ | ╕ | ╖ | ╗ | ╘ | ╙ | ╚ | ╛ | ╜ | ╝ | ╞ | ╟ |
| U+256x | ╠ | ╡ | ╢ | ╣ | ╤ | ╥ | ╦ | ╧ | ╨ | ╩ | ╪ | ╫ | ╬ | ╭ | ╮ | ╯ |
| U+257x | ╰ | ╱ | ╲ | ╳ | ╴ | ╵ | ╶ | ╷ | ╸ | ╹ | ╺ | ╻ | ╼ | ╽ | ╾ | ╿ |
Notes 1.As of Unicode version 18.0

==== Block Elements ====
| Code | Glyph | Description |
|---|---|---|
| U+2580 | ▀ | Upper half block |
| U+2581 | ▁ | Lower one eighth block |
| U+2582 | ▂ | Lower one quarter block |
| U+2583 | ▃ | Lower three eighths block |
| U+2584 | ▄ | Lower half block |
| U+2585 | ▅ | Lower five eighths block |
| U+2586 | ▆ | Lower three quarters block |
| U+2587 | ▇ | Lower seven eighths block |
| U+2588 | █ | Full block |
| U+2589 | ▉ | Left seven eighths block |
| U+258A | ▊ | Left three quarters block |
| U+258B | ▋ | Left five eighths block |
| U+258C | ▌ | Left half block |
| U+258D | ▍ | Left three eighths block |
| U+258E | ▎ | Left one quarter block |
| U+258F | ▏ | Left one eighth block |
| U+2590 | ▐ | Right half block |
| U+2591 | ░ | Light shade |
| U+2592 | ▒ | Medium shade |
| U+2593 | ▓ | Dark shade |
| U+2594 | ▔ | Upper one eighth block |
| U+2595 | ▕ | Right one eighth block |
| U+2596 | ▖ | Quadrant lower left |
| U+2597 | ▗ | Quadrant lower right |
| U+2598 | ▘ | Quadrant upper left |
| U+2599 | ▙ | Quadrant upper left and lower left and lower right |
| U+259A | ▚ | Quadrant upper left and lower right |
| U+259B | ▛ | Quadrant upper left and upper right and lower left |
| U+259C | ▜ | Quadrant upper left and upper right and lower right |
| U+259D | ▝ | Quadrant upper right |
| U+259E | ▞ | Quadrant upper right and lower left |
| U+259F | ▟ | Quadrant upper right and lower left and lower right |

==== Geometric Shapes ====
| Code | Glyph | Description |
|---|---|---|
| U+25A0 | ■ | Black square |
| U+25A1 | □ | White square |
| U+25A2 | ▢ | White square with rounded corners |
| U+25A3 | ▣ | White square containing small black square |
| U+25A4 | ▤ | Square with horizontal fill |
| U+25A5 | ▥ | Square with vertical fill |
| U+25A6 | ▦ | Square with orthogonal crosshatch fill |
| U+25A7 | ▧ | Square with upper left to lower right fill |
| U+25A8 | ▨ | Square with upper right to lower left fill |
| U+25A9 | ▩ | Square with diagonal crosshatch fill |
| U+25AA | ▪ | Black small square |
| U+25AB | ▫ | White small square |
| U+25AC | ▬ | Black rectangle |
| U+25AD | ▭ | White rectangle |
| U+25AE | ▮ | Black vertical rectangle |
| U+25AF | ▯ | White vertical rectangle |
| U+25B0 | ▰ | Black parallelogram |
| U+25B1 | ▱ | White parallelogram |
| U+25B2 | ▲ | Black up-pointing triangle |
| U+25B3 | △ | White up-pointing triangle |
| U+25B4 | ▴ | Black up-pointing small triangle |
| U+25B5 | ▵ | White up-pointing small triangle |
| U+25B6 | ▶ | Black right-pointing triangle |
| U+25B7 | ▷ | White right-pointing triangle |
| U+25B8 | ▸ | Black right-pointing small triangle |
| U+25B9 | ▹ | White right-pointing small triangle |
| U+25BA | ► | Black right-pointing pointer |
| U+25BB | ▻ | White right-pointing pointer |
| U+25BC | ▼ | Black down-pointing triangle |
| U+25BD | ▽ | White down-pointing triangle |
| U+25BE | ▾ | Black down-pointing small triangle |
| U+25BF | ▿ | White down-pointing small triangle |
| U+25C0 | ◀ | Black left-pointing triangle |
| U+25C1 | ◁ | White left-pointing triangle |
| U+25C2 | ◂ | Black left-pointing small triangle |
| U+25C3 | ◃ | White left-pointing small triangle |
| U+25C4 | ◄ | Black left-pointing pointer |
| U+25C5 | ◅ | White left-pointing pointer |
| U+25C6 | ◆ | Black diamond |
| U+25C7 | ◇ | White diamond |
| U+25C8 | ◈ | White diamond containing small black diamond |
| U+25C9 | ◉ | Fisheye |
| U+25CA | ◊ | Lozenge |
| U+25CB | ○ | White circle |
| U+25CC | ◌ | Dotted circle |
| U+25CD | ◍ | Circle with vertical fill |
| U+25CE | ◎ | Bullseye |
| U+25CF | ● | Black circle |
| U+25D0 | ◐ | Circle with left half black |
| U+25D1 | ◑ | Circle with right half black |
| U+25D2 | ◒ | Circle with lower half black |
| U+25D3 | ◓ | Circle with upper half black |
| U+25D4 | ◔ | Circle with upper right quadrant black |
| U+25D5 | ◕ | Circle with all but upper left quadrant black |
| U+25D6 | ◖ | Left half circle black |
| U+25D7 | ◗ | Right half black circle |
| U+25D8 | ◘ | Inverse bullet |
| U+25D9 | ◙ | Inverse white circle |
| U+25DA | ◚ | Upper half inverse white circle |
| U+25DB | ◛ | Lower half inverse white circle |
| U+25DC | ◜ | Upper left quadrant circular arc |
| U+25DD | ◝ | Upper right quadrant circular arc |
| U+25DE | ◞ | Lower right quadrant circular arc |
| U+25DF | ◟ | Lower left quadrant circular arc |
| U+25E0 | ◠ | Upper half circle |
| U+25E1 | ◡ | Lower half circle |
| U+25E2 | ◢ | Black lower right triangle |
| U+25E3 | ◣ | Black lower left triangle |
| U+25E4 | ◤ | Black upper left triangle |
| U+25E5 | ◥ | Black upper right triangle |
| U+25E6 | ◦ | White bullet |
| U+25E7 | ◧ | Square with left half black |
| U+25E8 | ◨ | Square with right half black |
| U+25E9 | ◩ | Square with upper left diagonal half black |
| U+25EA | ◪ | Square with lower right diagonal half black |
| U+25EB | ◫ | White square with vertical bisecting line |
| U+25EC | ◬ | White up-pointing triangle with dot |
| U+25ED | ◭ | Up-pointing triangle with left half black |
| U+25EE | ◮ | Up-pointing triangle with right half black |
| U+25EF | ◯ | Large circle |
| U+25F0 | ◰ | White square with upper left quadrant |
| U+25F1 | ◱ | White square with lower left quadrant |
| U+25F2 | ◲ | White square with lower right quadrant |
| U+25F3 | ◳ | White square with upper right quadrant |
| U+25F4 | ◴ | White circle with upper left quadrant |
| U+25F5 | ◵ | White circle with lower left quadrant |
| U+25F6 | ◶ | White circle with lower right quadrant |
| U+25F7 | ◷ | White circle with upper right quadrant |
| U+25F8 | ◸ | Upper left triangle |
| U+25F9 | ◹ | Upper right triangle |
| U+25FA | ◺ | Lower-left triangle |
| U+25FB | ◻ | White medium square |
| U+25FC | ◼ | Black medium square |
| U+25FD | ◽ | White medium small square |
| U+25FE | ◾ | Black medium small square |
| U+25FF | ◿ | Lower right triangle |

=== Technical Symbols ===
==== Control Pictures ====
Control Pictures^{[1]}^{[2]} Official Unicode Consortium code chart (PDF)
| | 0 | 1 | 2 | 3 | 4 | 5 | 6 | 7 | 8 | 9 | A | B | C | D | E | F |
| U+240x | ␀ | ␁ | ␂ | ␃ | ␄ | ␅ | ␆ | ␇ | ␈ | ␉ | ␊ | ␋ | ␌ | ␍ | ␎ | ␏ |
| U+241x | ␐ | ␑ | ␒ | ␓ | ␔ | ␕ | ␖ | ␗ | ␘ | ␙ | ␚ | ␛ | ␜ | ␝ | ␞ | ␟ |
| U+242x | ␠ | ␡ | ␢ | ␣ | ␤ | ␥ | ␦ | ␧ | ␨ | ␩ | | | | | | |
| U+243x | | | | | | | | | | | | | | | | |
Notes 1.As of Unicode version 18.0 2.Grey areas indicate non-assigned code points

==== Miscellaneous Technical ====
Miscellaneous Technical^{[1]}^{[2]} Official Unicode Consortium code chart (PDF)
| | 0 | 1 | 2 | 3 | 4 | 5 | 6 | 7 | 8 | 9 | A | B | C | D | E | F |
| U+230x | ⌀ | ⌁ | ⌂ | ⌃ | ⌄ | ⌅ | ⌆ | ⌇ | ⌈ | ⌉ | ⌊ | ⌋ | ⌌ | ⌍ | ⌎ | ⌏ |
| U+231x | ⌐ | ⌑ | ⌒ | ⌓ | ⌔ | ⌕ | ⌖ | ⌗ | ⌘ | ⌙ | ⌚ | ⌛ | ⌜ | ⌝ | ⌞ | ⌟ |
| U+232x | ⌠ | ⌡ | ⌢ | ⌣ | ⌤ | ⌥ | ⌦ | ⌧ | ⌨ | 〈 | 〉 | ⌫ | ⌬ | ⌭ | ⌮ | ⌯ |
| U+233x | ⌰ | ⌱ | ⌲ | ⌳ | ⌴ | ⌵ | ⌶ | ⌷ | ⌸ | ⌹ | ⌺ | ⌻ | ⌼ | ⌽ | ⌾ | ⌿ |
| U+234x | ⍀ | ⍁ | ⍂ | ⍃ | ⍄ | ⍅ | ⍆ | ⍇ | ⍈ | ⍉ | ⍊ | ⍋ | ⍌ | ⍍ | ⍎ | ⍏ |
| U+235x | ⍐ | ⍑ | ⍒ | ⍓ | ⍔ | ⍕ | ⍖ | ⍗ | ⍘ | ⍙ | ⍚ | ⍛ | ⍜ | ⍝ | ⍞ | ⍟ |
| U+236x | ⍠ | ⍡ | ⍢ | ⍣ | ⍤ | ⍥ | ⍦ | ⍧ | ⍨ | ⍩ | ⍪ | ⍫ | ⍬ | ⍭ | ⍮ | ⍯ |
| U+237x | ⍰ | ⍱ | ⍲ | ⍳ | ⍴ | ⍵ | ⍶ | ⍷ | ⍸ | ⍹ | ⍺ | ⍻ | ⍼ | ⍽ | ⍾ | ⍿ |
| U+238x | ⎀ | ⎁ | ⎂ | ⎃ | ⎄ | ⎅ | ⎆ | ⎇ | ⎈ | ⎉ | ⎊ | ⎋ | ⎌ | ⎍ | ⎎ | ⎏ |
| U+239x | ⎐ | ⎑ | ⎒ | ⎓ | ⎔ | ⎕ | ⎖ | ⎗ | ⎘ | ⎙ | ⎚ | ⎛ | ⎜ | ⎝ | ⎞ | ⎟ |
| U+23Ax | ⎠ | ⎡ | ⎢ | ⎣ | ⎤ | ⎥ | ⎦ | ⎧ | ⎨ | ⎩ | ⎪ | ⎫ | ⎬ | ⎭ | ⎮ | ⎯ |
| U+23Bx | ⎰ | ⎱ | ⎲ | ⎳ | ⎴ | ⎵ | ⎶ | ⎷ | ⎸ | ⎹ | ⎺ | ⎻ | ⎼ | ⎽ | ⎾ | ⎿ |
| U+23Cx | ⏀ | ⏁ | ⏂ | ⏃ | ⏄ | ⏅ | ⏆ | ⏇ | ⏈ | ⏉ | ⏊ | ⏋ | ⏌ | ⏍ | ⏎ | ⏏ |
| U+23Dx | ⏐ | ⏑ | ⏒ | ⏓ | ⏔ | ⏕ | ⏖ | ⏗ | ⏘ | ⏙ | ⏚ | ⏛ | ⏜ | ⏝ | ⏞ | ⏟ |
| U+23Ex | ⏠ | ⏡ | ⏢ | ⏣ | ⏤ | ⏥ | ⏦ | ⏧ | ⏨ | ⏩ | ⏪ | ⏫ | ⏬ | ⏭ | ⏮ | ⏯ |
| U+23Fx | ⏰ | ⏱ | ⏲ | ⏳ | ⏴ | ⏵ | ⏶ | ⏷ | ⏸ | ⏹ | ⏺ | ⏻ | ⏼ | ⏽ | ⏾ | ⏿ |
Notes 1.As of Unicode version 18.0 2.Unicode code points U+2329 and U+232A are deprecated as of Unicode version 5.2

==== Optical Character Recognition ====
Optical Character Recognition^{[1]}^{[2]} Official Unicode Consortium code chart (PDF)
| | 0 | 1 | 2 | 3 | 4 | 5 | 6 | 7 | 8 | 9 | A | B | C | D | E | F |
| U+244x | ⑀ | ⑁ | ⑂ | ⑃ | ⑄ | ⑅ | ⑆ | ⑇ | ⑈ | ⑉ | ⑊ | | | | | |
| U+245x | | | | | | | | | | | | | | | | |
Notes 1.As of Unicode version 18.0 2.Grey areas indicate non-assigned code points

==== Symbols for Legacy Computing ====
Symbols for Legacy Computing^{[1]}^{[2]} Official Unicode Consortium code chart (PDF)
| | 0 | 1 | 2 | 3 | 4 | 5 | 6 | 7 | 8 | 9 | A | B | C | D | E | F |
| U+1FB0x | 🬀 | 🬁 | 🬂 | 🬃 | 🬄 | 🬅 | 🬆 | 🬇 | 🬈 | 🬉 | 🬊 | 🬋 | 🬌 | 🬍 | 🬎 | 🬏 |
| U+1FB1x | 🬐 | 🬑 | 🬒 | 🬓 | 🬔 | 🬕 | 🬖 | 🬗 | 🬘 | 🬙 | 🬚 | 🬛 | 🬜 | 🬝 | 🬞 | 🬟 |
| U+1FB2x | 🬠 | 🬡 | 🬢 | 🬣 | 🬤 | 🬥 | 🬦 | 🬧 | 🬨 | 🬩 | 🬪 | 🬫 | 🬬 | 🬭 | 🬮 | 🬯 |
| U+1FB3x | 🬰 | 🬱 | 🬲 | 🬳 | 🬴 | 🬵 | 🬶 | 🬷 | 🬸 | 🬹 | 🬺 | 🬻 | 🬼 | 🬽 | 🬾 | 🬿 |
| U+1FB4x | 🭀 | 🭁 | 🭂 | 🭃 | 🭄 | 🭅 | 🭆 | 🭇 | 🭈 | 🭉 | 🭊 | 🭋 | 🭌 | 🭍 | 🭎 | 🭏 |
| U+1FB5x | 🭐 | 🭑 | 🭒 | 🭓 | 🭔 | 🭕 | 🭖 | 🭗 | 🭘 | 🭙 | 🭚 | 🭛 | 🭜 | 🭝 | 🭞 | 🭟 |
| U+1FB6x | 🭠 | 🭡 | 🭢 | 🭣 | 🭤 | 🭥 | 🭦 | 🭧 | 🭨 | 🭩 | 🭪 | 🭫 | 🭬 | 🭭 | 🭮 | 🭯 |
| U+1FB7x | 🭰 | 🭱 | 🭲 | 🭳 | 🭴 | 🭵 | 🭶 | 🭷 | 🭸 | 🭹 | 🭺 | 🭻 | 🭼 | 🭽 | 🭾 | 🭿 |
| U+1FB8x | 🮀 | 🮁 | 🮂 | 🮃 | 🮄 | 🮅 | 🮆 | 🮇 | 🮈 | 🮉 | 🮊 | 🮋 | 🮌 | 🮍 | 🮎 | 🮏 |
| U+1FB9x | 🮐 | 🮑 | 🮒 | | 🮔 | 🮕 | 🮖 | 🮗 | 🮘 | 🮙 | 🮚 | 🮛 | 🮜 | 🮝 | 🮞 | 🮟 |
| U+1FBAx | 🮠 | 🮡 | 🮢 | 🮣 | 🮤 | 🮥 | 🮦 | 🮧 | 🮨 | 🮩 | 🮪 | 🮫 | 🮬 | 🮭 | 🮮 | 🮯 |
| U+1FBBx | 🮰 | 🮱 | 🮲 | 🮳 | 🮴 | 🮵 | 🮶 | 🮷 | 🮸 | 🮹 | 🮺 | 🮻 | 🮼 | 🮽 | 🮾 | 🮿 |
| U+1FBCx | 🯀 | 🯁 | 🯂 | 🯃 | 🯄 | 🯅 | 🯆 | 🯇 | 🯈 | 🯉 | 🯊 | 🯋 | 🯌 | 🯍 | 🯎 | 🯏 |
| U+1FBDx | 🯐 | 🯑 | 🯒 | 🯓 | 🯔 | 🯕 | 🯖 | 🯗 | 🯘 | 🯙 | 🯚 | 🯛 | 🯜 | 🯝 | 🯞 | 🯟 |
| U+1FBEx | 🯠 | 🯡 | 🯢 | 🯣 | 🯤 | 🯥 | 🯦 | 🯧 | 🯨 | 🯩 | 🯪 | 🯫 | 🯬 | 🯭 | 🯮 | 🯯 |
| U+1FBFx | 🯰 | 🯱 | 🯲 | 🯳 | 🯴 | 🯵 | 🯶 | 🯷 | 🯸 | 🯹 | 🯺 | | | | | |
Notes 1.As of Unicode version 18.0 2.Grey areas indicate non-assigned code points

==== Symbols for Legacy Computing Supplement ====
Symbols for Legacy Computing Supplement^{[1]}^{[2]} Official Unicode Consortium code chart (PDF)
| | 0 | 1 | 2 | 3 | 4 | 5 | 6 | 7 | 8 | 9 | A | B | C | D | E | F |
| U+1CC0x | 𜰀 | 𜰁 | 𜰂 | 𜰃 | 𜰄 | 𜰅 | 𜰆 | 𜰇 | 𜰈 | 𜰉 | 𜰊 | 𜰋 | 𜰌 | 𜰍 | 𜰎 | 𜰏 |
| U+1CC1x | 𜰐 | 𜰑 | 𜰒 | 𜰓 | 𜰔 | 𜰕 | 𜰖 | 𜰗 | 𜰘 | 𜰙 | 𜰚 | 𜰛 | 𜰜 | 𜰝 | 𜰞 | 𜰟 |
| U+1CC2x | 𜰠 | 𜰡 | 𜰢 | 𜰣 | 𜰤 | 𜰥 | 𜰦 | 𜰧 | 𜰨 | 𜰩 | 𜰪 | 𜰫 | 𜰬 | 𜰭 | 𜰮 | 𜰯 |
| U+1CC3x | 𜰰 | 𜰱 | 𜰲 | 𜰳 | 𜰴 | 𜰵 | 𜰶 | 𜰷 | 𜰸 | 𜰹 | 𜰺 | 𜰻 | 𜰼 | 𜰽 | 𜰾 | 𜰿 |
| U+1CC4x | 𜱀 | 𜱁 | 𜱂 | 𜱃 | 𜱄 | 𜱅 | 𜱆 | 𜱇 | 𜱈 | 𜱉 | 𜱊 | 𜱋 | 𜱌 | 𜱍 | 𜱎 | 𜱏 |
| U+1CC5x | 𜱐 | 𜱑 | 𜱒 | 𜱓 | 𜱔 | 𜱕 | 𜱖 | 𜱗 | 𜱘 | 𜱙 | 𜱚 | 𜱛 | 𜱜 | 𜱝 | 𜱞 | 𜱟 |
| U+1CC6x | 𜱠 | 𜱡 | 𜱢 | 𜱣 | 𜱤 | 𜱥 | 𜱦 | 𜱧 | 𜱨 | 𜱩 | 𜱪 | 𜱫 | 𜱬 | 𜱭 | 𜱮 | 𜱯 |
| U+1CC7x | 𜱰 | 𜱱 | 𜱲 | 𜱳 | 𜱴 | 𜱵 | 𜱶 | 𜱷 | 𜱸 | 𜱹 | 𜱺 | 𜱻 | 𜱼 | 𜱽 | 𜱾 | 𜱿 |
| U+1CC8x | 𜲀 | 𜲁 | 𜲂 | 𜲃 | 𜲄 | 𜲅 | 𜲆 | 𜲇 | 𜲈 | 𜲉 | 𜲊 | 𜲋 | 𜲌 | 𜲍 | 𜲎 | 𜲏 |
| U+1CC9x | 𜲐 | 𜲑 | 𜲒 | 𜲓 | 𜲔 | 𜲕 | 𜲖 | 𜲗 | 𜲘 | 𜲙 | 𜲚 | 𜲛 | 𜲜 | 𜲝 | 𜲞 | 𜲟 |
| U+1CCAx | 𜲠 | 𜲡 | 𜲢 | 𜲣 | 𜲤 | 𜲥 | 𜲦 | 𜲧 | 𜲨 | 𜲩 | 𜲪 | 𜲫 | 𜲬 | 𜲭 | 𜲮 | 𜲯 |
| U+1CCBx | 𜲰 | 𜲱 | 𜲲 | 𜲳 | 𜲴 | 𜲵 | 𜲶 | 𜲷 | 𜲸 | 𜲹 | 𜲺 | 𜲻 | 𜲼 | 𜲽 | 𜲾 | 𜲿 |
| U+1CCCx | 𜳀 | 𜳁 | 𜳂 | 𜳃 | 𜳄 | 𜳅 | 𜳆 | 𜳇 | 𜳈 | 𜳉 | 𜳊 | 𜳋 | 𜳌 | 𜳍 | 𜳎 | 𜳏 |
| U+1CCDx | 𜳐 | 𜳑 | 𜳒 | 𜳓 | 𜳔 | 𜳕 | 𜳖 | 𜳗 | 𜳘 | 𜳙 | 𜳚 | 𜳛 | 𜳜 | 𜳝 | 𜳞 | 𜳟 |
| U+1CCEx | 𜳠 | 𜳡 | 𜳢 | 𜳣 | 𜳤 | 𜳥 | 𜳦 | 𜳧 | 𜳨 | 𜳩 | 𜳪 | 𜳫 | 𜳬 | 𜳭 | 𜳮 | 𜳯 |
| U+1CCFx | 𜳰 | 𜳱 | 𜳲 | 𜳳 | 𜳴 | 𜳵 | 𜳶 | 𜳷 | 𜳸 | 𜳹 | 𜳺 | 𜳻 | 𜳼 | | | |
| U+1CD0x | 𜴀 | 𜴁 | 𜴂 | 𜴃 | 𜴄 | 𜴅 | 𜴆 | 𜴇 | 𜴈 | 𜴉 | 𜴊 | 𜴋 | 𜴌 | 𜴍 | 𜴎 | 𜴏 |
| U+1CD1x | 𜴐 | 𜴑 | 𜴒 | 𜴓 | 𜴔 | 𜴕 | 𜴖 | 𜴗 | 𜴘 | 𜴙 | 𜴚 | 𜴛 | 𜴜 | 𜴝 | 𜴞 | 𜴟 |
| U+1CD2x | 𜴠 | 𜴡 | 𜴢 | 𜴣 | 𜴤 | 𜴥 | 𜴦 | 𜴧 | 𜴨 | 𜴩 | 𜴪 | 𜴫 | 𜴬 | 𜴭 | 𜴮 | 𜴯 |
| U+1CD3x | 𜴰 | 𜴱 | 𜴲 | 𜴳 | 𜴴 | 𜴵 | 𜴶 | 𜴷 | 𜴸 | 𜴹 | 𜴺 | 𜴻 | 𜴼 | 𜴽 | 𜴾 | 𜴿 |
| U+1CD4x | 𜵀 | 𜵁 | 𜵂 | 𜵃 | 𜵄 | 𜵅 | 𜵆 | 𜵇 | 𜵈 | 𜵉 | 𜵊 | 𜵋 | 𜵌 | 𜵍 | 𜵎 | 𜵏 |
| U+1CD5x | 𜵐 | 𜵑 | 𜵒 | 𜵓 | 𜵔 | 𜵕 | 𜵖 | 𜵗 | 𜵘 | 𜵙 | 𜵚 | 𜵛 | 𜵜 | 𜵝 | 𜵞 | 𜵟 |
| U+1CD6x | 𜵠 | 𜵡 | 𜵢 | 𜵣 | 𜵤 | 𜵥 | 𜵦 | 𜵧 | 𜵨 | 𜵩 | 𜵪 | 𜵫 | 𜵬 | 𜵭 | 𜵮 | 𜵯 |
| U+1CD7x | 𜵰 | 𜵱 | 𜵲 | 𜵳 | 𜵴 | 𜵵 | 𜵶 | 𜵷 | 𜵸 | 𜵹 | 𜵺 | 𜵻 | 𜵼 | 𜵽 | 𜵾 | 𜵿 |
| U+1CD8x | 𜶀 | 𜶁 | 𜶂 | 𜶃 | 𜶄 | 𜶅 | 𜶆 | 𜶇 | 𜶈 | 𜶉 | 𜶊 | 𜶋 | 𜶌 | 𜶍 | 𜶎 | 𜶏 |
| U+1CD9x | 𜶐 | 𜶑 | 𜶒 | 𜶓 | 𜶔 | 𜶕 | 𜶖 | 𜶗 | 𜶘 | 𜶙 | 𜶚 | 𜶛 | 𜶜 | 𜶝 | 𜶞 | 𜶟 |
| U+1CDAx | 𜶠 | 𜶡 | 𜶢 | 𜶣 | 𜶤 | 𜶥 | 𜶦 | 𜶧 | 𜶨 | 𜶩 | 𜶪 | 𜶫 | 𜶬 | 𜶭 | 𜶮 | 𜶯 |
| U+1CDBx | 𜶰 | 𜶱 | 𜶲 | 𜶳 | 𜶴 | 𜶵 | 𜶶 | 𜶷 | 𜶸 | 𜶹 | 𜶺 | 𜶻 | 𜶼 | 𜶽 | 𜶾 | 𜶿 |
| U+1CDCx | 𜷀 | 𜷁 | 𜷂 | 𜷃 | 𜷄 | 𜷅 | 𜷆 | 𜷇 | 𜷈 | 𜷉 | 𜷊 | 𜷋 | 𜷌 | 𜷍 | 𜷎 | 𜷏 |
| U+1CDDx | 𜷐 | 𜷑 | 𜷒 | 𜷓 | 𜷔 | 𜷕 | 𜷖 | 𜷗 | 𜷘 | 𜷙 | 𜷚 | 𜷛 | 𜷜 | 𜷝 | 𜷞 | 𜷟 |
| U+1CDEx | 𜷠 | 𜷡 | 𜷢 | 𜷣 | 𜷤 | 𜷥 | 𜷦 | 𜷧 | 𜷨 | 𜷩 | 𜷪 | 𜷫 | 𜷬 | 𜷭 | 𜷮 | 𜷯 |
| U+1CDFx | 𜷰 | 𜷱 | 𜷲 | 𜷳 | 𜷴 | 𜷵 | 𜷶 | 𜷷 | 𜷸 | 𜷹 | 𜷺 | 𜷻 | 𜷼 | 𜷽 | 𜷾 | 𜷿 |
| U+1CE0x | 𜸀 | 𜸁 | 𜸂 | 𜸃 | 𜸄 | 𜸅 | 𜸆 | 𜸇 | 𜸈 | 𜸉 | 𜸊 | 𜸋 | 𜸌 | 𜸍 | 𜸎 | 𜸏 |
| U+1CE1x | 𜸐 | 𜸑 | 𜸒 | 𜸓 | 𜸔 | 𜸕 | 𜸖 | 𜸗 | 𜸘 | 𜸙 | 𜸚 | 𜸛 | 𜸜 | 𜸝 | 𜸞 | 𜸟 |
| U+1CE2x | 𜸠 | 𜸡 | 𜸢 | 𜸣 | 𜸤 | 𜸥 | 𜸦 | 𜸧 | 𜸨 | 𜸩 | 𜸪 | 𜸫 | 𜸬 | 𜸭 | 𜸮 | 𜸯 |
| U+1CE3x | 𜸰 | 𜸱 | 𜸲 | 𜸳 | 𜸴 | 𜸵 | 𜸶 | 𜸷 | 𜸸 | 𜸹 | 𜸺 | 𜸻 | 𜸼 | 𜸽 | 𜸾 | 𜸿 |
| U+1CE4x | 𜹀 | 𜹁 | 𜹂 | 𜹃 | 𜹄 | 𜹅 | 𜹆 | 𜹇 | 𜹈 | 𜹉 | 𜹊 | 𜹋 | 𜹌 | 𜹍 | 𜹎 | 𜹏 |
| U+1CE5x | 𜹐 | 𜹑 | 𜹒 | 𜹓 | 𜹔 | 𜹕 | 𜹖 | 𜹗 | 𜹘 | 𜹙 | 𜹚 | 𜹛 | 𜹜 | 𜹝 | 𜹞 | 𜹟 |
| U+1CE6x | 𜹠 | 𜹡 | 𜹢 | 𜹣 | 𜹤 | 𜹥 | 𜹦 | 𜹧 | 𜹨 | 𜹩 | 𜹪 | 𜹫 | 𜹬 | 𜹭 | 𜹮 | 𜹯 |
| U+1CE7x | 𜹰 | 𜹱 | 𜹲 | 𜹳 | 𜹴 | 𜹵 | 𜹶 | 𜹷 | 𜹸 | 𜹹 | 𜹺 | 𜹻 | 𜹼 | 𜹽 | 𜹾 | 𜹿 |
| U+1CE8x | 𜺀 | 𜺁 | 𜺂 | 𜺃 | 𜺄 | 𜺅 | 𜺆 | 𜺇 | 𜺈 | 𜺉 | 𜺊 | 𜺋 | 𜺌 | 𜺍 | 𜺎 | 𜺏 |
| U+1CE9x | 𜺐 | 𜺑 | 𜺒 | 𜺓 | 𜺔 | 𜺕 | 𜺖 | 𜺗 | 𜺘 | 𜺙 | 𜺚 | 𜺛 | 𜺜 | 𜺝 | 𜺞 | 𜺟 |
| U+1CEAx | 𜺠 | 𜺡 | 𜺢 | 𜺣 | 𜺤 | 𜺥 | 𜺦 | 𜺧 | 𜺨 | 𜺩 | 𜺪 | 𜺫 | 𜺬 | 𜺭 | 𜺮 | 𜺯 |
| U+1CEBx | 𜺰 | 𜺱 | 𜺲 | 𜺳 | | | | | | | 𜺺 | 𜺻 | 𜺼 | 𜺽 | 𜺾 | 𜺿 |
Notes 1.As of Unicode version 18.0 2.Grey areas indicate non-assigned code points

=== Miscellaneous Symbols ===
Miscellaneous Symbols^{[1]} Official Unicode Consortium code chart (PDF)
| | 0 | 1 | 2 | 3 | 4 | 5 | 6 | 7 | 8 | 9 | A | B | C | D | E | F |
| U+260x | ☀ | ☁ | ☂ | ☃ | ☄ | ★ | ☆ | ☇ | ☈ | ☉ | ☊ | ☋ | ☌ | ☍ | ☎ | ☏ |
| U+261x | ☐ | ☑ | ☒ | ☓ | ☔ | ☕ | ☖ | ☗ | ☘ | ☙ | ☚ | ☛ | ☜ | ☝ | ☞ | ☟ |
| U+262x | ☠ | ☡ | ☢ | ☣ | ☤ | ☥ | ☦ | ☧ | ☨ | ☩ | ☪ | ☫ | ☬ | ☭ | ☮ | ☯ |
| U+263x | ☰ | ☱ | ☲ | ☳ | ☴ | ☵ | ☶ | ☷ | ☸ | ☹ | ☺ | ☻ | ☼ | ☽ | ☾ | ☿ |
| U+264x | ♀ | ♁ | ♂ | ♃ | ♄ | ♅ | ♆ | ♇ | ♈ | ♉ | ♊ | ♋ | ♌ | ♍ | ♎ | ♏ |
| U+265x | ♐ | ♑ | ♒ | ♓ | ♔ | ♕ | ♖ | ♗ | ♘ | ♙ | ♚ | ♛ | ♜ | ♝ | ♞ | ♟ |
| U+266x | ♠ | ♡ | ♢ | ♣ | ♤ | ♥ | ♦ | ♧ | ♨ | ♩ | ♪ | ♫ | ♬ | ♭ | ♮ | ♯ |
| U+267x | ♰ | ♱ | ♲ | ♳ | ♴ | ♵ | ♶ | ♷ | ♸ | ♹ | ♺ | ♻ | ♼ | ♽ | ♾ | ♿ |
| U+268x | ⚀ | ⚁ | ⚂ | ⚃ | ⚄ | ⚅ | ⚆ | ⚇ | ⚈ | ⚉ | ⚊ | ⚋ | ⚌ | ⚍ | ⚎ | ⚏ |
| U+269x | ⚐ | ⚑ | ⚒ | ⚓ | ⚔ | ⚕ | ⚖ | ⚗ | ⚘ | ⚙ | ⚚ | ⚛ | ⚜ | ⚝ | ⚞ | ⚟ |
| U+26Ax | ⚠ | ⚡ | ⚢ | ⚣ | ⚤ | ⚥ | ⚦ | ⚧ | ⚨ | ⚩ | ⚪ | ⚫ | ⚬ | ⚭ | ⚮ | ⚯ |
| U+26Bx | ⚰ | ⚱ | ⚲ | ⚳ | ⚴ | ⚵ | ⚶ | ⚷ | ⚸ | ⚹ | ⚺ | ⚻ | ⚼ | ⚽ | ⚾ | ⚿ |
| U+26Cx | ⛀ | ⛁ | ⛂ | ⛃ | ⛄ | ⛅ | ⛆ | ⛇ | ⛈ | ⛉ | ⛊ | ⛋ | ⛌ | ⛍ | ⛎ | ⛏ |
| U+26Dx | ⛐ | ⛑ | ⛒ | ⛓ | ⛔ | ⛕ | ⛖ | ⛗ | ⛘ | ⛙ | ⛚ | ⛛ | ⛜ | ⛝ | ⛞ | ⛟ |
| U+26Ex | ⛠ | ⛡ | ⛢ | ⛣ | ⛤ | ⛥ | ⛦ | ⛧ | ⛨ | ⛩ | ⛪ | ⛫ | ⛬ | ⛭ | ⛮ | ⛯ |
| U+26Fx | ⛰ | ⛱ | ⛲ | ⛳ | ⛴ | ⛵ | ⛶ | ⛷ | ⛸ | ⛹ | ⛺ | ⛻ | ⛼ | ⛽ | ⛾ | ⛿ |
Notes 1.As of Unicode version 18.0

=== Miscellaneous Symbols Supplement ===
Miscellaneous Symbols Supplement^{[1]}^{[2]} Official Unicode Consortium code chart (PDF)
| | 0 | 1 | 2 | 3 | 4 | 5 | 6 | 7 | 8 | 9 | A | B | C | D | E | F |
| U+1CECx | 𜻀 | 𜻁 | 𜻂 | 𜻃 | 𜻄 | 𜻅 | 𜻆 | 𜻇 | 𜻈 | 𜻉 | 𜻊 | 𜻋 | 𜻌 | 𜻍 | 𜻎 | 𜻏 |
| U+1CEDx | 𜻐 | | 𜻒 | 𜻓 | 𜻔 | | | | | | | | | 𜻝 | 𜻞 | 𜻟 |
| U+1CEEx | 𜻠 | 𜻡 | 𜻢 | 𜻣 | 𜻤 | 𜻥 | 𜻦 | 𜻧 | 𜻨 | 𜻩 | 𜻪 | 𜻫 | 𜻬 | 𜻭 | 𜻮 | 𜻯 |
| U+1CEFx | 𜻰 | 𜻱 | 𜻲 | 𜻳 | 𜻴 | 𜻵 | 𜻶 | 𜻷 | 𜻸 | 𜻹 | 𜻺 | 𜻻 | 𜻼 | 𜻽 | | |
Notes 1.As of Unicode version 18.0 2.Grey areas indicate non-assigned code points

=== Dingbats ===
| Code | Result | Description |
|---|---|---|
| U+2700 | ✀ | Black safety scissors |
| U+2701 | ✁ | Upper blade scissors |
| U+2702 | ✂ | Black scissors |
| U+2703 | ✃ | Lower blade scissors |
| U+2704 | ✄ | White scissors |
| U+2705 | ✅ | White heavy check mark |
| U+2706 | ✆ | Telephone location sign |
| U+2707 | ✇ | Tape drive |
| U+2708 | ✈ | Airplane |
| U+2709 | ✉ | Envelope |
| U+270A | ✊ | Raised fist |
| U+270B | ✋ | Raised hand |
| U+270C | ✌ | Victory hand |
| U+270D | ✍ | Writing hand |
| U+270E | ✎ | Lower right pencil |
| U+270F | ✏ | Pencil |
| U+2710 | ✐ | Upper right pencil |
| U+2711 | ✑ | White nib |
| U+2712 | ✒ | Black nib |
| U+2713 | ✓ | Check mark |
| U+2714 | ✔ | Heavy check mark |
| U+2715 | ✕ | Multiplication X |
| U+2716 | ✖ | Heavy multiplication X |
| U+2717 | ✗ | Ballot X |
| U+2718 | ✘ | Heavy ballot X |
| U+2719 | ✙ | Outlined Greek cross |
| U+271A | ✚ | Heavy Greek cross |
| U+271B | ✛ | Open center cross |
| U+271C | ✜ | Heavy open center cross |
| U+271D | ✝ | Latin cross |
| U+271E | ✞ | Shadowed white Latin cross |
| U+271F | ✟ | Outlined Latin cross |
| U+2720 | ✠ | Maltese cross |
| U+2721 | ✡ | Star of David |
| U+2722 | ✢ | Four teardrop-spoked asterisk |
| U+2723 | ✣ | Four balloon-spoked asterisk |
| U+2724 | ✤ | Heavy four balloon-spoked asterisk |
| U+2725 | ✥ | Four club-spoked asterisk |
| U+2726 | ✦ | Black four-pointed star |
| U+2727 | ✧ | White four-pointed star |
| U+2728 | ✨ | Sparkles |
| U+2729 | ✩ | Stress outlined white star |
| U+272A | ✪ | Circled white star |
| U+272B | ✫ | Open center black star |
| U+272C | ✬ | Black center white star |
| U+272D | ✭ | Outlined black star |
| U+272E | ✮ | Heavy outlined black star |
| U+272F | ✯ | Pinwheel star |
| U+2730 | ✰ | Shadowed white star |
| U+2731 | ✱ | Heavy asterisk |
| U+2732 | ✲ | Open center asterisk |
| U+2733 | ✳ | Eight spoked asterisk |
| U+2734 | ✴ | Eight pointed black star |
| U+2735 | ✵ | Eight pointed pinwheel star |
| U+2736 | ✶ | Six pointed black star |
| U+2737 | ✷ | Eight pointed rectilinear black star |
| U+2738 | ✸ | Heavy eight pointed rectilinear black star |
| U+2739 | ✹ | Twelve pointed black star |
| U+273A | ✺ | Sixteen pointed asterisk |
| U+273B | ✻ | Teardrop spoked asterisk |
| U+273C | ✼ | Open center teardrop spoked asterisk |
| U+273D | ✽ | Heavy teardrop spoked asterisk |
| U+273E | ✾ | Six petalled black and white florette |
| U+273F | ✿ | Black florette |
| U+2740 | ❀ | White florette |
| U+2741 | ❁ | Eight petalled outlined black florette |
| U+2742 | ❂ | Circled open center eight pointed star |
| U+2743 | ❃ | Heavy teardrop spoked pinwheel asterisk |
| U+2744 | ❄ | Snowflake |
| U+2745 | ❅ | Tight trifoliate snowflake |
| U+2746 | ❆ | Heavy chevron snowflake |
| U+2747 | ❇ | Sparkle |
| U+2748 | ❈ | Heavy sparkle |
| U+2749 | ❉ | Balloon spoked asterisk |
| U+274A | ❊ | Eight teardrop spoked propeller asterisk |
| U+274B | ❋ | Heavy eight teardrop spoked propeller asterisk |
| U+274C | ❌ | Cross mark |
| U+274D | ❍ | Shadowed white circle |
| U+274E | ❎ | Negative squared cross mark |
| U+274F | ❏ | Lower right drop-shadowed white square |
| U+2750 | ❐ | Upper right drop-shadowed white square |
| U+2751 | ❑ | Lower right shadowed white square |
| U+2752 | ❒ | Upper right shadowed white square |
| U+2753 | ❓ | Black question mark ornament |
| U+2754 | ❔ | White question mark ornament |
| U+2755 | ❕ | White exclamation mark ornament |
| U+2756 | ❖ | Black diamond minus white X |
| U+2757 | ❗ | Heavy exclamation mark symbol |
| U+2758 | ❘ | Light vertical bar |
| U+2759 | ❙ | Medium vertical bar |
| U+275A | ❚ | Heavy vertical bar |
| U+275B | ❛ | Heavy single turned comma quotation mark ornament |
| U+275C | ❜ | Heavy single comma quotation mark ornament |
| U+275D | ❝ | Heavy double turned comma quotation mark ornament |
| U+275E | ❞ | Heavy double comma quotation mark ornament |
| U+275F | ❜ | Heavy low single comma quotation mark ornament |
| U+2760 | ❠ | Heavy low double comma quotation mark ornament |
| U+2761 | ❡ | Curved stem paragraph sign ornament |
| U+2762 | ❢ | Heavy exclamation mark ornament |
| U+2763 | ❣ | Heavy heart exclamation mark ornament |
| U+2764 | ❤ | Heavy black heart |
| U+2765 | ❥ | Rotated heavy black heart bullet |
| U+2766 | ❦ | Floral heart |
| U+2767 | ❧ | Rotated floral heart bullet |
| U+2768 | ❨ | Medium left parenthesis ornament |
| U+2769 | ❩ | Medium right parenthesis ornament |
| U+276A | ❪ | Medium flattened left parenthesis ornament |
| U+276B | ❫ | Medium flattened right parenthesis ornament |
| U+276C | ❬ | Medium left-pointing angle bracket ornament |
| U+276D | ❭ | Medium right-pointing angle bracket ornament |
| U+276E | ❮ | Heavy left-pointing angle quotation mark ornament |
| U+276F | ❯ | Heavy right-pointing angle quotation mark ornament |
| U+2770 | ❰ | Heavy left-pointing angle bracket ornament |
| U+2771 | ❱ | Heavy right-pointing angle bracket ornament |
| U+2772 | ❲ | Light left tortoise shell bracket ornament |
| U+2773 | ❳ | Light right tortoise shell bracket ornament |
| U+2774 | ❴ | Medium left curly bracket ornament |
| U+2775 | ❵ | Medium right curly bracket ornament |
| U+2776 | ❶ | Dingbat negative circled digit one |
| U+2777 | ❷ | Dingbat negative circled digit two |
| U+2778 | ❸ | Dingbat negative circled digit three |
| U+2779 | ❹ | Dingbat negative circled digit four |
| U+277A | ❺ | Dingbat negative circled digit five |
| U+277B | ❻ | Dingbat negative circled digit six |
| U+277C | ❼ | Dingbat negative circled digit seven |
| U+277D | ❽ | Dingbat negative circled digit eight |
| U+277E | ❾ | Dingbat negative circled digit nine |
| U+277F | ❿ | Dingbat negative circled digit ten |
| U+2780 | ➀ | Dingbat circled sans-serif digit one |
| U+2781 | ➁ | Dingbat circled sans-serif digit two |
| U+2782 | ➂ | Dingbat circled sans-serif digit three |
| U+2783 | ➃ | Dingbat circled sans-serif digit four |
| U+2784 | ➄ | Dingbat circled sans-serif digit five |
| U+2785 | ➅ | Dingbat circled sans-serif digit six |
| U+2786 | ➆ | Dingbat circled sans-serif digit seven |
| U+2787 | ➇ | Dingbat circled sans-serif digit eight |
| U+2788 | ➈ | Dingbat circled sans-serif digit nine |
| U+2789 | ➉ | Dingbat circled sans-serif digit ten |
| U+278A | ➊ | Dingbat negative circled sans-serif digit one |
| U+278B | ➋ | Dingbat negative circled sans-serif digit two |
| U+278C | ➌ | Dingbat negative circled sans-serif digit three |
| U+278D | ➍ | Dingbat negative circled sans-serif digit four |
| U+278E | ➎ | Dingbat negative circled sans-serif digit five |
| U+278F | ➏ | Dingbat negative circled sans-serif digit six |
| U+2790 | ➐ | Dingbat negative circled sans-serif digit seven |
| U+2791 | ➑ | Dingbat negative circled sans-serif digit eight |
| U+2792 | ➒ | Dingbat negative circled sans-serif digit nine |
| U+2793 | ➓ | Dingbat negative circled sans-serif digit ten |
| U+2794 | ➔ | Heavy wide-headed rightward arrow |
| U+2795 | ➕ | Heavy plus sign |
| U+2796 | ➖ | Heavy minus sign |
| U+2797 | ➗ | Heavy division sign |
| U+2798 | ➘ | Heavy south east arrow |
| U+2799 | ➙ | Heavy rightward arrow |
| U+279A | ➚ | Heavy north east arrow |
| U+279B | ➛ | Drafting point rightward arrow |
| U+279C | ➜ | Heavy round-tipped rightward arrow |
| U+279D | ➝ | Triangle-headed rightward arrow |
| U+279E | ➞ | Heavy triangle-headed rightward arrow |
| U+279F | ➟ | Dashed triangle-headed rightward arrow |
| U+27A0 | ➠ | Heavy dashed triangle-headed rightward arrow |
| U+27A1 | ➡ | Black rightward arrow |
| U+27A2 | ➢ | Three-D top-lighted rightward arrowhead |
| U+27A3 | ➣ | Three-D bottom-lighted rightward arrowhead |
| U+27A4 | ➤ | Black rightward arrowhead |
| U+27A5 | ➥ | Heavy black curved downward and rightward arrow |
| U+27A6 | ➦ | Heavy black curved upward and rightward arrow |
| U+27A7 | ➧ | Squat black rightward arrow |
| U+27A8 | ➨ | Heavy concave-pointed black rightward arrow |
| U+27A9 | ➩ | Right-shaded white rightward arrow |
| U+27AA | ➪ | Left-shaded white rightward arrow |
| U+27AB | ➫ | Back-tilted shadowed white rightward arrow |
| U+27AC | ➬ | Front-tilted shadowed white rightward arrow |
| U+27AD | ➭ | Heavy lower right-shadowed white rightward arrow |
| U+27AE | ➮ | Heavy upper right-shadowed white rightward arrow |
| U+27AF | ➯ | Notched lower right-shadowed white rightward arrow |
| U+27B0 | ➰ | Curly loop |
| U+27B1 | ➱ | Notched upper right-shadowed white rightward arrow |
| U+27B2 | ➲ | Circled heavy white rightward arrow |
| U+27B3 | ➳ | White-feathered rightward arrow |
| U+27B4 | ➴ | Black-feathered south east arrow |
| U+27B5 | ➵ | Black-feathered rightward arrow |
| U+27B6 | ➶ | Black-feathered north east arrow |
| U+27B7 | ➷ | Heavy black-feathered south east arrow |
| U+27B8 | ➸ | Heavy black-feathered rightward arrow |
| U+27B9 | ➹ | Heavy black-feathered north east arrow |
| U+27BA | ➺ | Teardrop-barbed rightward arrow |
| U+27BB | ➻ | Heavy teardrop-shanked rightward arrow |
| U+27BC | ➼ | Wedge-tailed rightward arrow |
| U+27BD | ➽ | Heavy wedge-tailed rightward arrow |
| U+27BE | ➾ | Open-outlined rightward arrow |
| U+27BF | ➿ | Double curly loop |

=== Emoji ===
- Emoji in Unicode

=== Alchemical symbols ===
Alchemical Symbols^{[1]} Official Unicode Consortium code chart (PDF)
| | 0 | 1 | 2 | 3 | 4 | 5 | 6 | 7 | 8 | 9 | A | B | C | D | E | F |
| U+1F70x | 🜀 | 🜁 | 🜂 | 🜃 | 🜄 | 🜅 | 🜆 | 🜇 | 🜈 | 🜉 | 🜊 | 🜋 | 🜌 | 🜍 | 🜎 | 🜏 |
| U+1F71x | 🜐 | 🜑 | 🜒 | 🜓 | 🜔 | 🜕 | 🜖 | 🜗 | 🜘 | 🜙 | 🜚 | 🜛 | 🜜 | 🜝 | 🜞 | 🜟 |
| U+1F72x | 🜠 | 🜡 | 🜢 | 🜣 | 🜤 | 🜥 | 🜦 | 🜧 | 🜨 | 🜩 | 🜪 | 🜫 | 🜬 | 🜭 | 🜮 | 🜯 |
| U+1F73x | 🜰 | 🜱 | 🜲 | 🜳 | 🜴 | 🜵 | 🜶 | 🜷 | 🜸 | 🜹 | 🜺 | 🜻 | 🜼 | 🜽 | 🜾 | 🜿 |
| U+1F74x | 🝀 | 🝁 | 🝂 | 🝃 | 🝄 | 🝅 | 🝆 | 🝇 | 🝈 | 🝉 | 🝊 | 🝋 | 🝌 | 🝍 | 🝎 | 🝏 |
| U+1F75x | 🝐 | 🝑 | 🝒 | 🝓 | 🝔 | 🝕 | 🝖 | 🝗 | 🝘 | 🝙 | 🝚 | 🝛 | 🝜 | 🝝 | 🝞 | 🝟 |
| U+1F76x | 🝠 | 🝡 | 🝢 | 🝣 | 🝤 | 🝥 | 🝦 | 🝧 | 🝨 | 🝩 | 🝪 | 🝫 | 🝬 | 🝭 | 🝮 | 🝯 |
| U+1F77x | 🝰 | 🝱 | 🝲 | 🝳 | 🝴 | 🝵 | 🝶 | 🝷 | 🝸 | 🝹 | 🝺 | 🝻 | 🝼 | 🝽 | 🝾 | 🝿 |
Notes 1.As of Unicode version 18.0

=== Game symbols ===
==== Mahjong Tiles ====
Mahjong Tiles^{[1]}^{[2]} Official Unicode Consortium code chart (PDF)
| | 0 | 1 | 2 | 3 | 4 | 5 | 6 | 7 | 8 | 9 | A | B | C | D | E | F |
| U+1F00x | 🀀 | 🀁 | 🀂 | 🀃 | 🀄 | 🀅 | 🀆 | 🀇 | 🀈 | 🀉 | 🀊 | 🀋 | 🀌 | 🀍 | 🀎 | 🀏 |
| U+1F01x | 🀐 | 🀑 | 🀒 | 🀓 | 🀔 | 🀕 | 🀖 | 🀗 | 🀘 | 🀙 | 🀚 | 🀛 | 🀜 | 🀝 | 🀞 | 🀟 |
| U+1F02x | 🀠 | 🀡 | 🀢 | 🀣 | 🀤 | 🀥 | 🀦 | 🀧 | 🀨 | 🀩 | 🀪 | 🀫 | | | | |
Notes 1.As of Unicode version 18.0 2.Grey areas indicate non-assigned code points

==== Domino Tiles ====
Domino Tiles^{[1]}^{[2]} Official Unicode Consortium code chart (PDF)
| | 0 | 1 | 2 | 3 | 4 | 5 | 6 | 7 | 8 | 9 | A | B | C | D | E | F |
| U+1F03x | 🀰 | 🀱 | 🀲 | 🀳 | 🀴 | 🀵 | 🀶 | 🀷 | 🀸 | 🀹 | 🀺 | 🀻 | 🀼 | 🀽 | 🀾 | 🀿 |
| U+1F04x | 🁀 | 🁁 | 🁂 | 🁃 | 🁄 | 🁅 | 🁆 | 🁇 | 🁈 | 🁉 | 🁊 | 🁋 | 🁌 | 🁍 | 🁎 | 🁏 |
| U+1F05x | 🁐 | 🁑 | 🁒 | 🁓 | 🁔 | 🁕 | 🁖 | 🁗 | 🁘 | 🁙 | 🁚 | 🁛 | 🁜 | 🁝 | 🁞 | 🁟 |
| U+1F06x | 🁠 | 🁡 | 🁢 | 🁣 | 🁤 | 🁥 | 🁦 | 🁧 | 🁨 | 🁩 | 🁪 | 🁫 | 🁬 | 🁭 | 🁮 | 🁯 |
| U+1F07x | 🁰 | 🁱 | 🁲 | 🁳 | 🁴 | 🁵 | 🁶 | 🁷 | 🁸 | 🁹 | 🁺 | 🁻 | 🁼 | 🁽 | 🁾 | 🁿 |
| U+1F08x | 🂀 | 🂁 | 🂂 | 🂃 | 🂄 | 🂅 | 🂆 | 🂇 | 🂈 | 🂉 | 🂊 | 🂋 | 🂌 | 🂍 | 🂎 | 🂏 |
| U+1F09x | 🂐 | 🂑 | 🂒 | 🂓 | | | | | | | | | | | | |
Notes: 1. As of Unicode version 18.0; 2. Grey areas indicate non-assigned code points

==== Playing Cards ====
Playing Cards^{[1]}^{[2]} Official Unicode Consortium code chart (PDF)
| | 0 | 1 | 2 | 3 | 4 | 5 | 6 | 7 | 8 | 9 | A | B | C | D | E | F |
| U+1F0Ax | 🂠 | 🂡 | 🂢 | 🂣 | 🂤 | 🂥 | 🂦 | 🂧 | 🂨 | 🂩 | 🂪 | 🂫 | 🂬 | 🂭 | 🂮 | |
| U+1F0Bx | | 🂱 | 🂲 | 🂳 | 🂴 | 🂵 | 🂶 | 🂷 | 🂸 | 🂹 | 🂺 | 🂻 | 🂼 | 🂽 | 🂾 | 🂿 |
| U+1F0Cx | | 🃁 | 🃂 | 🃃 | 🃄 | 🃅 | 🃆 | 🃇 | 🃈 | 🃉 | 🃊 | 🃋 | 🃌 | 🃍 | 🃎 | 🃏 |
| U+1F0Dx | | 🃑 | 🃒 | 🃓 | 🃔 | 🃕 | 🃖 | 🃗 | 🃘 | 🃙 | 🃚 | 🃛 | 🃜 | 🃝 | 🃞 | 🃟 |
| U+1F0Ex | 🃠 | 🃡 | 🃢 | 🃣 | 🃤 | 🃥 | 🃦 | 🃧 | 🃨 | 🃩 | 🃪 | 🃫 | 🃬 | 🃭 | 🃮 | 🃯 |
| U+1F0Fx | 🃰 | 🃱 | 🃲 | 🃳 | 🃴 | 🃵 | | | | | | | | | | |
Notes 1.As of Unicode version 18.0 2.Grey areas indicate non-assigned code points

==== Chess Symbols ====
Chess Symbols^{[1]}^{[2]} Official Unicode Consortium code chart (PDF)
| | 0 | 1 | 2 | 3 | 4 | 5 | 6 | 7 | 8 | 9 | A | B | C | D | E | F |
| U+1FA0x | 🨀 | 🨁 | 🨂 | 🨃 | 🨄 | 🨅 | 🨆 | 🨇 | 🨈 | 🨉 | 🨊 | 🨋 | 🨌 | 🨍 | 🨎 | 🨏 |
| U+1FA1x | 🨐 | 🨑 | 🨒 | 🨓 | 🨔 | 🨕 | 🨖 | 🨗 | 🨘 | 🨙 | 🨚 | 🨛 | 🨜 | 🨝 | 🨞 | 🨟 |
| U+1FA2x | 🨠 | 🨡 | 🨢 | 🨣 | 🨤 | 🨥 | 🨦 | 🨧 | 🨨 | 🨩 | 🨪 | 🨫 | 🨬 | 🨭 | 🨮 | 🨯 |
| U+1FA3x | 🨰 | 🨱 | 🨲 | 🨳 | 🨴 | 🨵 | 🨶 | 🨷 | 🨸 | 🨹 | 🨺 | 🨻 | 🨼 | 🨽 | 🨾 | 🨿 |
| U+1FA4x | 🩀 | 🩁 | 🩂 | 🩃 | 🩄 | 🩅 | 🩆 | 🩇 | 🩈 | 🩉 | 🩊 | 🩋 | 🩌 | 🩍 | 🩎 | 🩏 |
| U+1FA5x | 🩐 | 🩑 | 🩒 | 🩓 | 🩔 | 🩕 | 🩖 | 🩗 | | | | | | | | |
| U+1FA6x | 🩠 | 🩡 | 🩢 | 🩣 | 🩤 | 🩥 | 🩦 | 🩧 | 🩨 | 🩩 | 🩪 | 🩫 | 🩬 | 🩭 | | |
Notes 1.As of Unicode version 18.0 2.Grey areas indicate non-assigned code points

=== Ancient Symbols ===
Ancient Symbols^{[1]}^{[2]} Official Unicode Consortium code chart (PDF)
| | 0 | 1 | 2 | 3 | 4 | 5 | 6 | 7 | 8 | 9 | A | B | C | D | E | F |
| U+1019x | 𐆐 | 𐆑 | 𐆒 | 𐆓 | 𐆔 | 𐆕 | 𐆖 | 𐆗 | 𐆘 | 𐆙 | 𐆚 | 𐆛 | 𐆜 | | | |
| U+101Ax | 𐆠 | | | | | | | | | | | | | | | |
| U+101Bx | | | | | | | | | | | | | | | | |
| U+101Cx | | | | | | | | | | | | | | | | |
Notes 1.As of Unicode version 18.0 2.Grey areas indicate non-assigned code points

== Special areas and format characters ==
=== Specials ===
Specials^{[1]}^{[2]}^{[3]} Official Unicode Consortium code chart (PDF)
| | 0 | 1 | 2 | 3 | 4 | 5 | 6 | 7 | 8 | 9 | A | B | C | D | E | F |
| U+FFFx | | | | | | | | | | IAA | IAS | IAT | ￼ | � | | |
Notes 1.As of Unicode version 18.0 2.Grey areas indicate non-assigned code points 3.Black areas indicate noncharacters (code points that are guaranteed never to be assigned as encoded characters in the Unicode Standard)

=== Tags ===
Tags^{[1]}^{[2]}^{[3]} Official Unicode Consortium code chart (PDF)
| | 0 | 1 | 2 | 3 | 4 | 5 | 6 | 7 | 8 | 9 | A | B | C | D | E | F |
| U+E000x | | BEGIN | | | | | | | | | | | | | | |
| U+E001x | | | | | | | | | | | | | | | | |
| U+E002x | SP | ! | " | # | $ | % | & | ' | ( | ) | * | + | , | - | . | / |
| U+E003x | 0 | 1 | 2 | 3 | 4 | 5 | 6 | 7 | 8 | 9 | : | ; | < | = | > | ? |
| U+E004x | @ | A | B | C | D | E | F | G | H | I | J | K | L | M | N | O |
| U+E005x | P | Q | R | S | T | U | V | W | X | Y | Z | [ | \ | ] | ^ | _ |
| U+E006x | ` | a | b | c | d | e | f | g | h | i | j | k | l | m | n | o |
| U+E007x | p | q | r | s | t | u | v | w | x | y | z | { | | | } | ~ | END |
1.As of Unicode version 18.0 2.Grey areas indicate non-assigned code points 3.Unicode code points U+E0001 and U+E0020 through U+E007F were deprecated with Unicode version 5.1 however as of Unicode version 9.0 only U+E0001 remains deprecated

=== Private Use Areas ===
- Private Use Area (Unicode block)
- Supplementary Private Use Area-A (Unicode block)
- Supplementary Private Use Area-B (Unicode block)

=== Surrogates ===
- Low Surrogates (Unicode block)
- High Surrogates (Unicode block)
- High Private Use Surrogates (Unicode block)

=== Variation Selectors ===
- Variation Selectors (Unicode block)
- Variation Selectors Supplement (Unicode block)

=== Noncharacters ===
- U+FDD0..U+FDEF
- U+FFFE..U+FFFF
- U+1FFFE..U+1FFFF
- U+2FFFE..U+2FFFF
- U+3FFFE..U+3FFFF
- U+4FFFE..U+4FFFF
- U+5FFFE..U+5FFFF
- U+6FFFE..U+6FFFF
- U+7FFFE..U+7FFFF
- U+8FFFE..U+8FFFF
- U+9FFFE..U+9FFFF
- U+AFFFE..U+AFFFF
- U+BFFFE..U+BFFFF
- U+CFFFE..U+CFFFF
- U+DFFFE..U+DFFFF
- U+EFFFE..U+EFFFF
- U+FFFFE..U+FFFFF
- U+10FFFE..U+10FFFF

== See also ==
- Comparison of Unicode encodings
- Open-source Unicode typefaces
- GNU Unifont – Duospaced bitmap font
- List of radicals in Unicode
- List of Unicode fonts
- List of typefaces
- Typographic unit
- Unicode Consortium
- Fallback font – Type of reserve typeface
- Unicode font
- Universal Character Set characters
- DIN 91379 Unicode subset for Europe
- List of Cyrillic letters
- List of Latin letters by shape

| Basic | | Supplementary | | | | | | | |
| Plane 0 | | Plane 1 | | Plane 2 | | Plane 3 | Planes 4–13 | Plane 14 | Planes 15–16 |
| 0000–FFFF | | 10000–1FFFF | | 20000–2FFFF | | 30000–3FFFF | 40000–DFFFF | E0000–EFFFF | F0000–10FFFF |
| Basic Multilingual Plane | | Supplementary Multilingual Plane | | Supplementary Ideographic Plane | | Tertiary Ideographic Plane | unassigned | Supplementary Special-purpose Plane | Supplementary Private Use Area planes |
| BMP | | SMP | | SIP | | TIP | — | SSP | SPUA-A/B |
|---|---|---|---|---|---|---|---|---|---|
| 0000–0FFF; 1000–1FFF; 2000–2FFF; 3000–3FFF; 4000–4FFF; 5000–5FFF; 6000–6FFF; 7000–7FFF | 8000–8FFF; 9000–9FFF; A000–AFFF; B000–BFFF; C000–CFFF; D000–DFFF; E000–EFFF; F000–FFFF | 10000–10FFF; 11000–11FFF; 12000–12FFF; 13000–13FFF; 14000–14FFF 16000–16FFF; 17000–17FFF | 18000–18FFF; 19000–19FFF; 1A000–1AFFF; 1B000–1BFFF; 1C000–1CFFF; 1D000–1DFFF; 1E000–1EFFF; 1F000–1FFFF | 20000–20FFF; 21000–21FFF; 22000–22FFF; 23000–23FFF; 24000–24FFF; 25000–25FFF; 26000–26FFF; 27000–27FFF | 28000–28FFF; 29000–29FFF; 2A000–2AFFF; 2B000–2BFFF; 2C000–2CFFF; 2D000–2DFFF; 2E000–2EFFF; 2F000–2FFFF | 30000–30FFF; 31000–31FFF; 32000–32FFF; 33000–33FFF 3D000–3DFFF; 3E000–3EFFF; 3F000–3FFFF | | E0000–E0FFF | 15: SPUA-A; F0000–FFFFF 16: SPUA-B; 100000–10FFFF |
