= Letter (alphabet) =

Character in alphabet writing systems

In a writing system, a letter is a grapheme that generally corresponds to a phoneme—the smallest functional unit of speech—though there is rarely total one-to-one correspondence between the two. An alphabet is a writing system that uses letters.

== Definition and usage ==
A letter is a type of grapheme, the smallest functional unit within a writing system. Letters are graphemes that broadly correspond to phonemes, the smallest functional units of sound in speech. Similarly to how phonemes are combined to form spoken words, letters may be combined to form written words. A single phoneme may also be represented by multiple letters in sequence, collectively called a multigraph. Multigraphs include digraphs of two letters (e.g. English ch, sh, th), and trigraphs of three letters (e.g. English tch).

The same letterform may be used in different alphabets while representing different phonemic categories. The Latin H, Greek eta ⟨Η⟩, and Cyrillic en ⟨Н⟩ are homoglyphs, but represent different phonemes. Conversely, the distinct forms of ⟨S⟩, the Greek sigma ⟨Σ⟩, and Cyrillic es ⟨С⟩ each represent analogous /s/ phonemes.

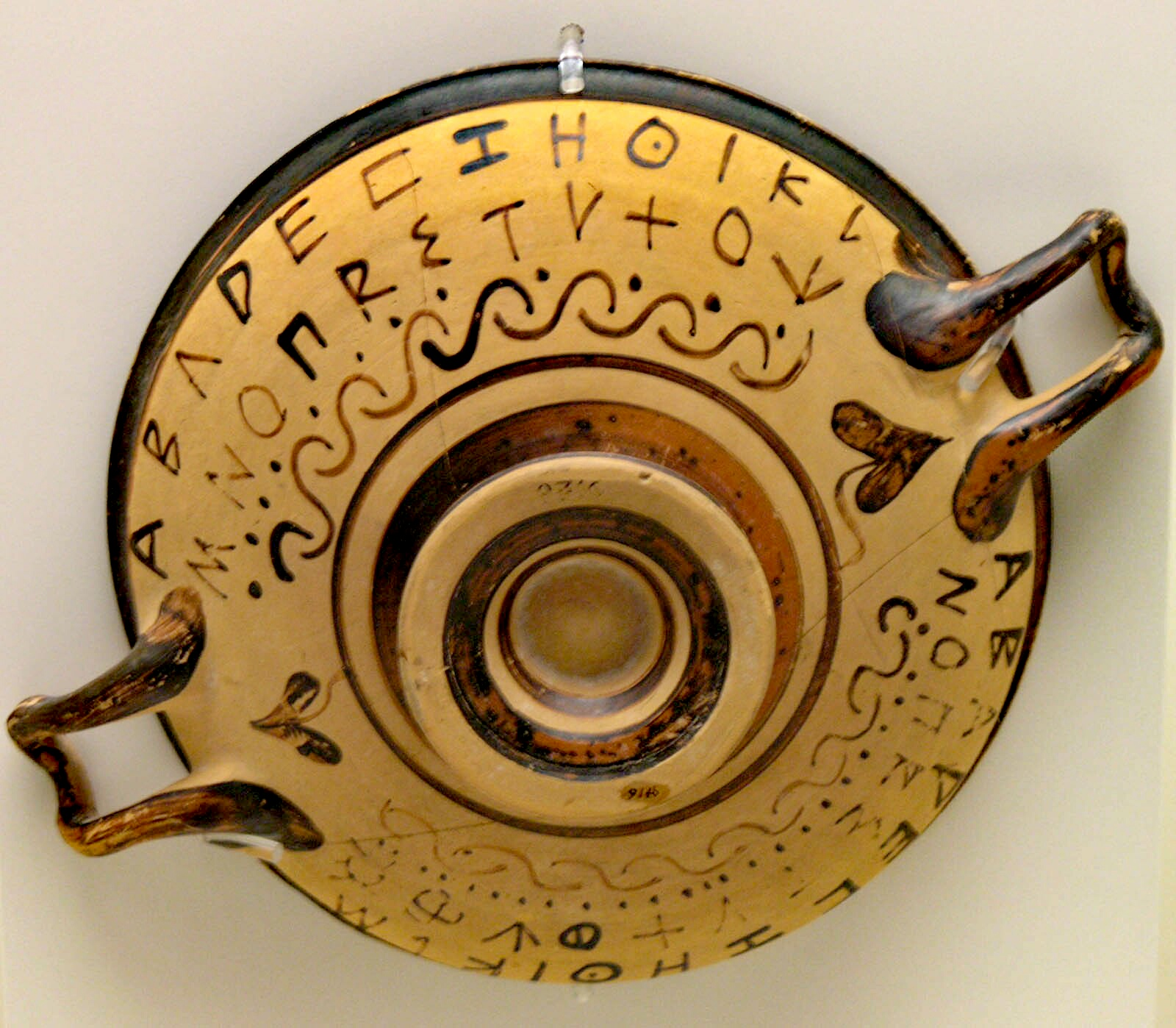
Ancient inscription on a vase featuring Greek letters

Letters are associated with specific names, which may differ between languages and dialects. Z, for example, is usually called zed outside of the United States, where it is named zee. Both ultimately derive from the name of the parent Greek letter zeta ⟨Ζ⟩. In alphabets, letters are arranged in alphabetical order, which also may vary by language. In Spanish, ⟨ñ⟩ is considered to be a separate letter from ⟨n⟩, though this distinction is not usually recognised in English dictionaries. In computer systems, each has its own code point, U+006E n LATIN SMALL LETTER N and U+00F1 ñ LATIN SMALL LETTER N WITH TILDE, respectively.

Letters may also function as numerals with assigned numerical values, for example with Roman numerals. Greek and Latin letters have a variety of modern uses in mathematics, science, and engineering.

People and objects are sometimes named after letters, for one of these reasons:

1. The letter is an abbreviation, e.g. "G-man" as slang for a Federal Bureau of Investigation agent, arose as short for "Government Man"
2. Alphabetical order used as a counting system, e.g. Plan A, Plan B, etc.; alpha ray, beta ray, gamma ray, etc.
3. The shape of the letter, e.g. A-clamp, A-frame, D-ring, F-clamp, G-clamp, H-block, H engine, O-ring, R-clip, S or Z twist, U engine, U-bend, V engine, W engine, X engine, Z-drive, a river delta, omega block
4. Other reasons, e.g. X-ray after "x the unknown" in algebra, because the discoverer did not know what they were

The word letter entered Middle English c. 1200, borrowed from the Old French letre. It eventually displaced the previous Old English term bōcstæf 'bookstaff'. Letter ultimately descends from the Latin littera, which may have been derived from the Greek diphthera 'writing tablet' via Etruscan. Until the 19th century, letter was also used interchangeably to refer to a speech segment.

== History ==
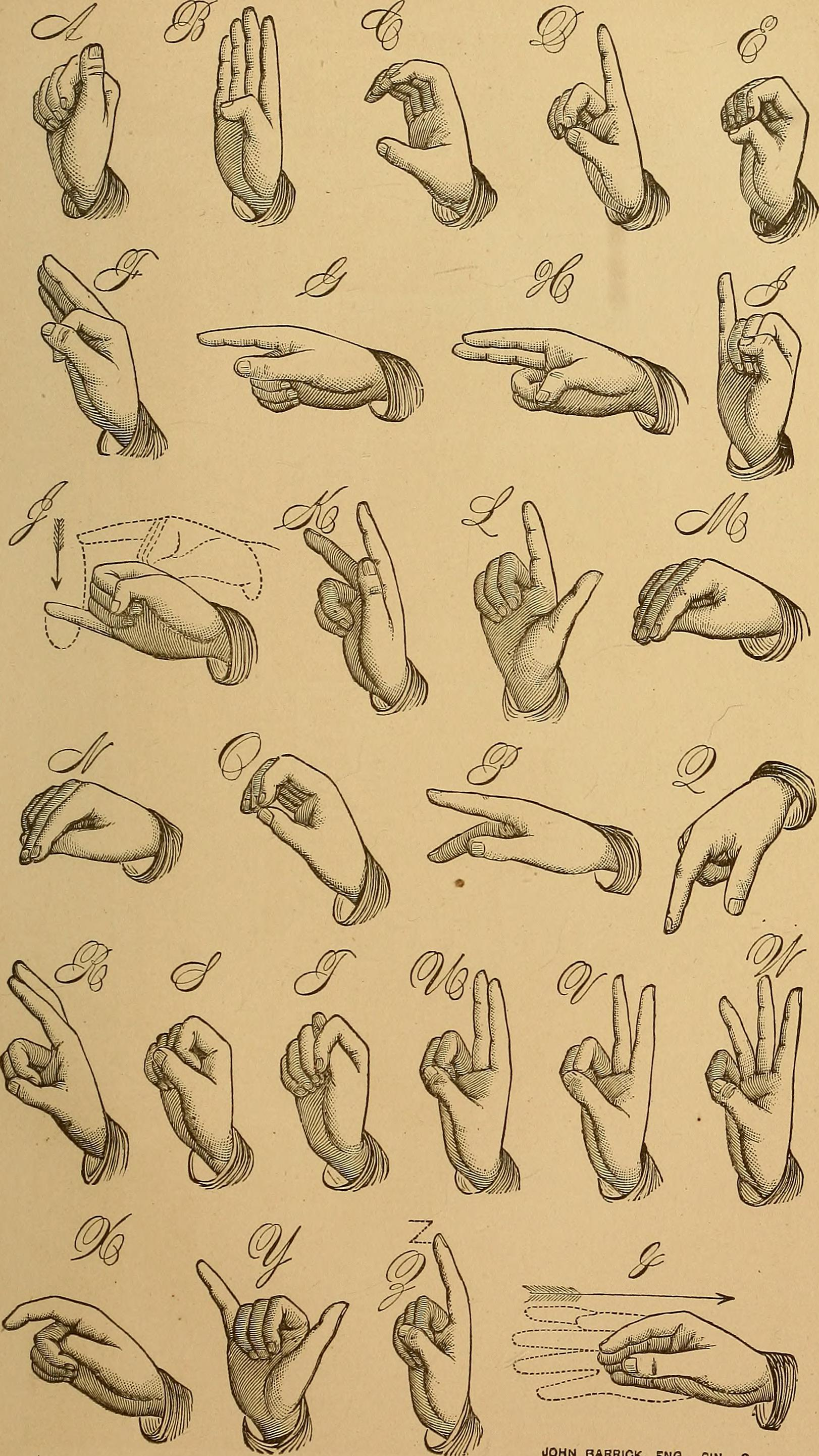
The American manual alphabet, an example of letters in fingerspelling

Before alphabets, phonograms, graphic symbols of sounds, were used. There were three kinds of phonograms: verbal, pictures for entire words, syllabic, which stood for articulations of words, and alphabetic, which represented signs or letters. The earliest examples of which are from Ancient Egypt and Ancient China, dating to c. 3000 BCE. The first consonantal alphabet emerged around c. 1800 BCE, representing the Phoenicians, Semitic workers in Egypt. Their script was originally written and read from right to left. From the Phoenician alphabet came the Etruscan and Greek alphabets. From there, the most widely used alphabet today emerged, Latin, which is written and read from left to right.

The Phoenician alphabet had 22 letters, nineteen of which the Latin alphabet used, and the Greek alphabet, adapted c. 900 BCE, added four letters to those used in Phoenician. This Greek alphabet was the first to assign letters not only to consonant sounds, but also to vowels.

The Roman Empire further developed and refined the Latin alphabet, beginning around 500 BCE. During the fifth and sixth centuries, the development of lowercase letters began to emerge in Roman writing. At this point, paragraphs, uppercase and lowercase letters, and the concept of sentences and clauses still had not emerged; these final bits of development emerged in the late 7th and early 8th centuries.

Finally, many slight letter additions and drops were made to the common alphabet used in the western world. Minor changes were made such as the removal of certain letters, such as thorn ⟨Þ þ⟩, wynn ⟨Ƿ ƿ⟩, and eth ⟨Ð ð⟩.

== Types ==
=== Uppercase and lowercase ===
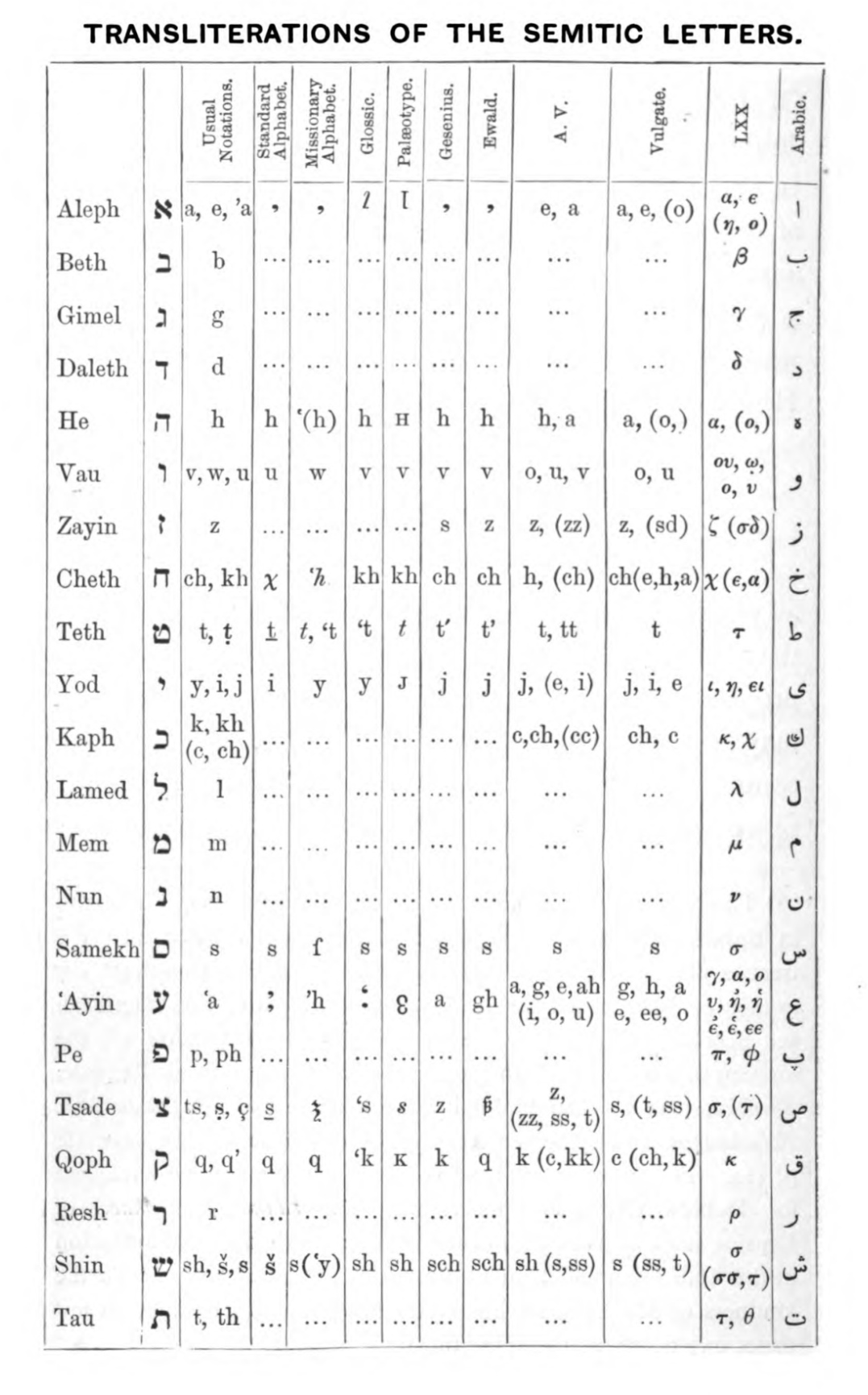
Transliterations and iconography of the Semitic script, the first consonantal alphabet

A letter can have multiple variants, or allographs, related to variation in style of handwriting or printing. Some writing systems have two major types of allographs for each letter: an uppercase form (also called capital or majuscule) and a lowercase form (also called minuscule). Upper- and lowercase letters represent the same sound, but serve different functions in writing. Capital letters are most often used at the beginning of a sentence, as the first letter of a proper name or title, or in headers or inscriptions. They may also serve other functions, such as in the German language where all nouns begin with capital letters.

The terms uppercase and lowercase originated in the days of handset type for printing presses. Individual letter blocks were kept in specific compartments of drawers in a type case. Capital letters were stored in a higher drawer or upper case.

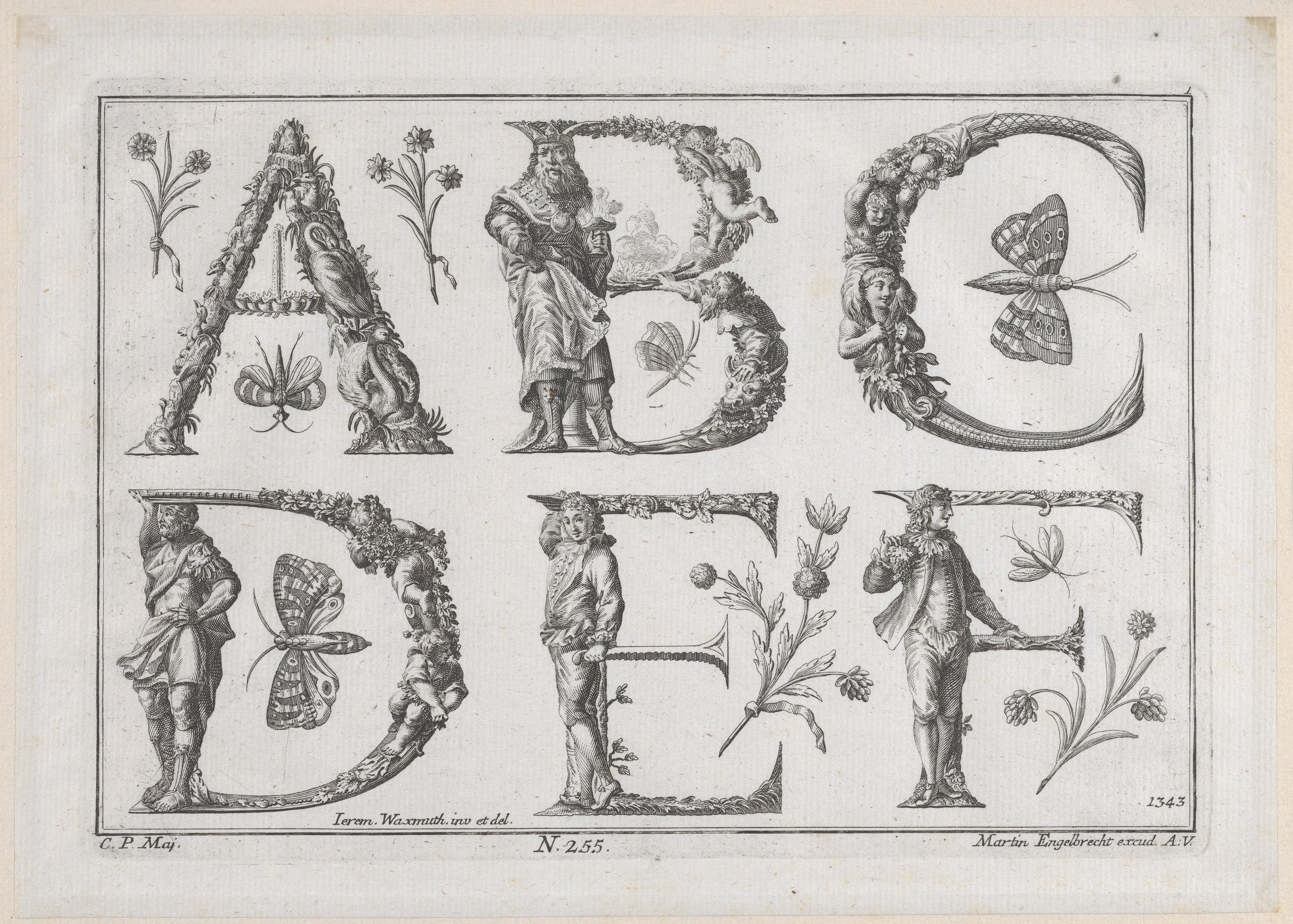
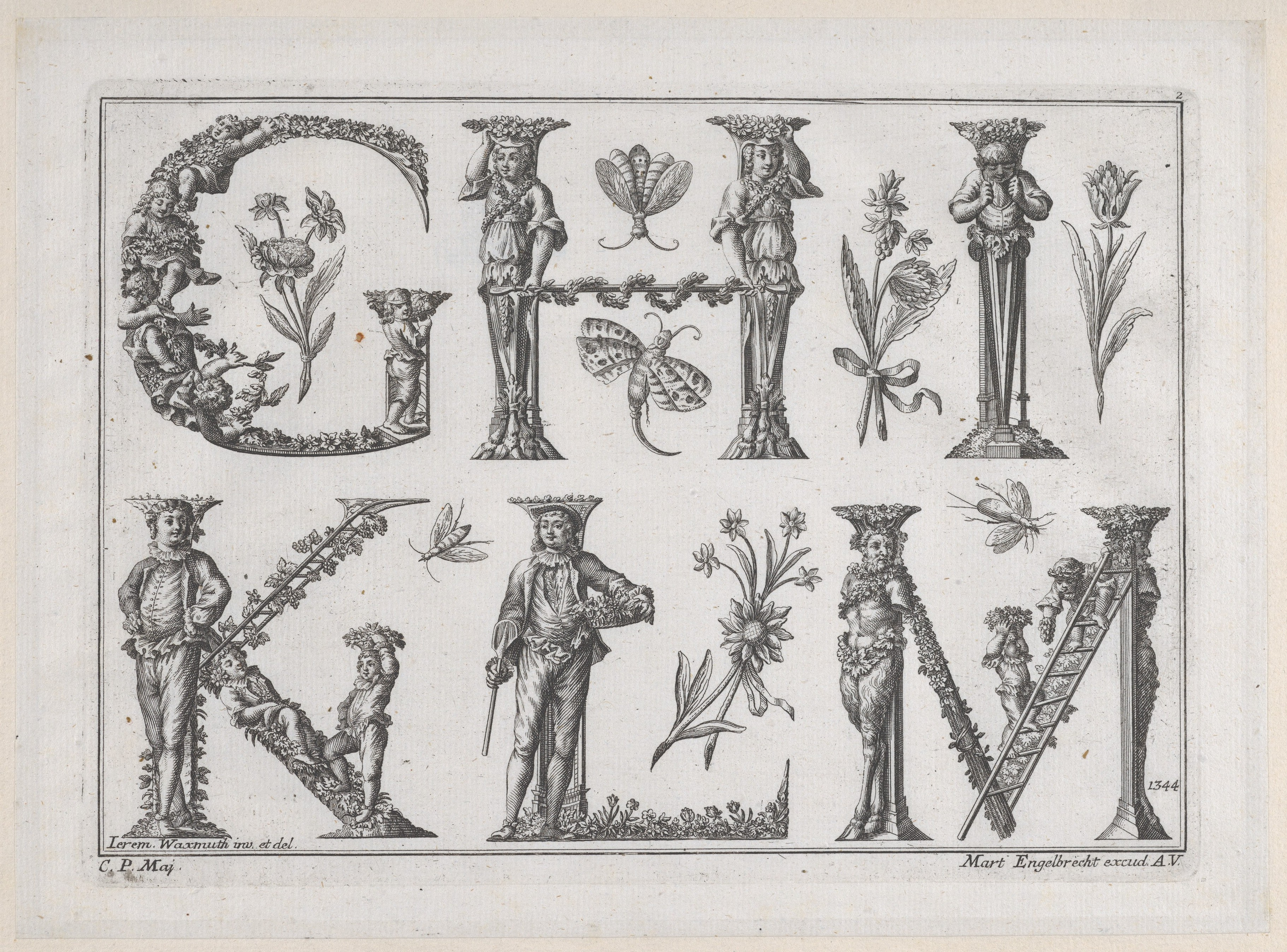
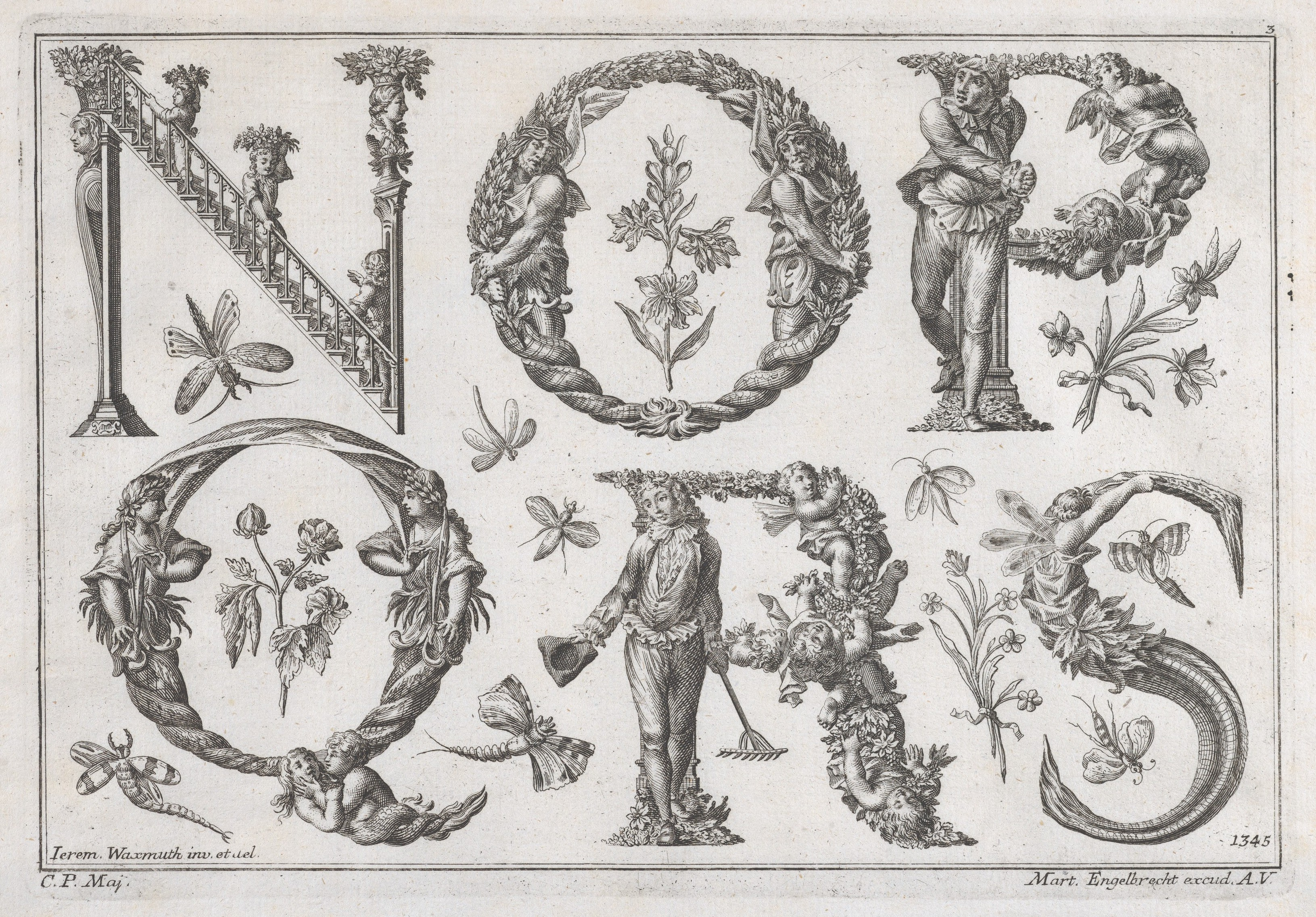

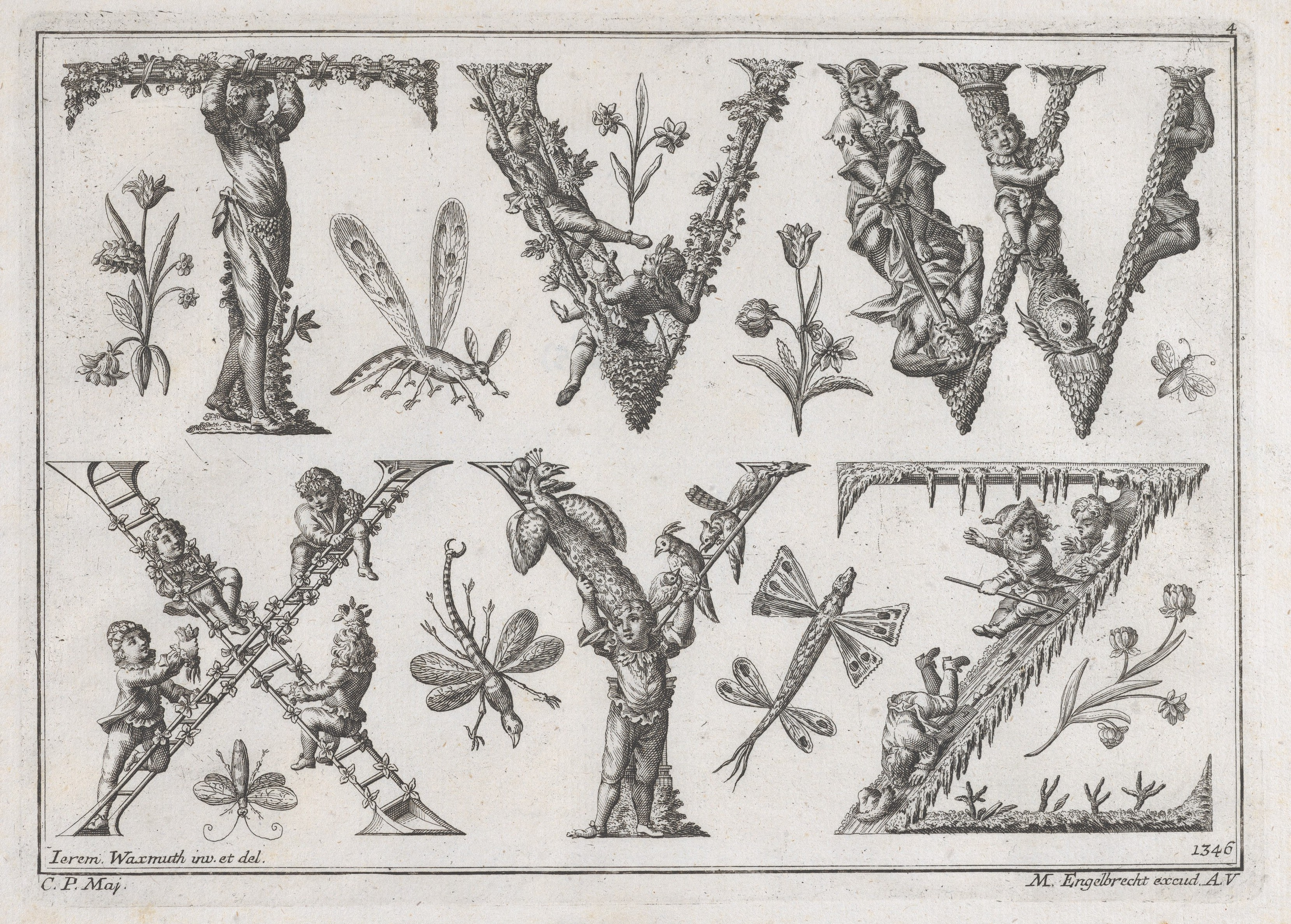
Engravings of decorated Latin letters, from the 18th century (note the lack of a J and a U)

=== Diacritics ===
In most alphabetic scripts, diacritics (or accents) are routinely used. English is unusual in not using them except for loanwords from other languages or personal names (for example, naïve, Brontë). The ubiquity of this usage is indicated by the existence of precomposed characters for use with computer systems (for example, ⟨á⟩, ⟨à⟩, ⟨ä⟩, ⟨â⟩, ⟨ã⟩.)

Ascenders (as in "h") and descenders (as in "p") make the height of lower-case letters vary.

== Examples in writing systems ==
Venn diagram of letters in the Greek, Cyrillic and Latin alphabets. Certain letters appear in two or more of these alphabets, although they may not represent the same sound.

In the following table, letters from multiple different writing systems are shown, to demonstrate the variety of letters used throughout the world.

Example alphabet	Letters in example alphabet
Assamese	অ, আ, ই, ঈ, উ, ঊ, ঋ, এ, ঐ, ও, ঔ, ক, খ, গ, ঘ, ঙ, চ, ছ, জ, ঝ, ঞ, ট, ঠ, ড, ঢ, ণ, ত, থ, দ, ধ, ন, প, ফ, ব, ভ, ম, য, ৰ, ল, ৱ, শ, ষ, স, হ, ক্ষ, ড়, ঢ়, য়, ৎ, ং, ঃ, ঁ
Bengali	অ, আ, ই, ঈ, উ, ঊ, ঋ, এ, ঐ, ও, ঔ, ক, খ, গ, ঘ, ঙ, চ, ছ, জ, ঝ, ঞ, ট, ঠ, ড, ঢ, ণ, ত, থ, দ, ধ, ন, প, ফ, ব, ভ, ম, য, ল, শ, ষ, স, হ,ক্ষ, ড়, ঢ়, য়, ৎ, ং, ঃ, ঁ
Arabic	(Alphabetical from right to left) ﺍ, ﺏ, ﺕ, ﺙ, ﺝ, ﺡ, ﺥ, ﺩ, ﺫ, ﺭ, ﺯ, ﺱ, ﺵ, ﺹ, ﺽ, ﻁ, ﻅ, ﻉ, ﻍ, ﻑ, ﻕ, ﻙ, ﻝ, ﻡ, ﻥ, هـ, ﻭ, ﻱ
Armenian	Ա, Բ, Գ, Դ, Ե, Զ, Է, Ը, Թ, Ժ, Ի, Լ, Խ, Ծ, Կ, Հ, Ձ, Ղ, Ճ, Մ, Յ, Ն, Շ, Ո, Չ, Պ, Ջ, Ռ, Ս, Վ, Տ, Ր, Ց, Ւ, Փ, Ք, Օ, Ֆ
Syriac	(Alphabetical from right to left) ܐ, ܒ, ܓ, ܕ, ܗ, ܘ, ܙ, ܚ, ܛ, ܝ, ܟܟ, ܠ, ܡܡ, ܢܢ, ܣ, ܥ, ܦ, ܨ, ܩ, ܪ, ܫ, ܬ
Cyrillic script	А, Б, В, Г, Д, Е, Ё, Ж, З, И, Й, К, Л, М, Н, О, П, Р, С, Т, У, Ф, Х, Ц, Ч, Ш, Щ, Ъ, Ы, Ь, Э, Ю, Я
Georgian script	ა, ბ, გ, დ, ე, ვ, ზ, თ, ი, კ, ლ, მ, ნ, ო, პ, ჟ, რ, ს, ტ, უ, ფ, ქ, ღ, ყ, შ, ჩ, ც, ძ, წ, ჭ, ხ, ჯ, ჰ
Greek	Α, Β, Γ, Δ, Ε, Ζ, Η, Θ, Ι, Κ, Λ, Μ, Ν, Ξ, Ο, Π, Ρ, Σ, Τ, Υ, Φ, Χ, Ψ, Ω
Hebrew alphabet	(Alphabetical from right to left) א, ב, ג, ד, ה, ו, ז, ח, ט, י, כ, ל, מ, נ, ס, ע, פ, צ, ק, ר, ש, ת
Latin alphabet	A, B, C, D, E, F, G, H, I, J, K, L, M, N, O, P, Q, R, S, T, U, V, W, X, Y, Z
Hangul	ㄱ ㄲ ㄴ ㄷ ㄸ ㄹ ㅁ ㅂ ㅃ ㅅ ㅆ ㅇ ㅈ ㅉ ㅊ ㅋ ㅌ ㅍ ㅎ ㅏ ㅐ ㅑ ㅒ ㅓ ㅔ ㅕ ㅖ ㅗ ㅘ ㅙ ㅚ ㅛ ㅜ ㅝ ㅞ ㅟ ㅠ ㅡ ㅢ ㅣ
Burmese	က ခ ဂ ဃ င စ ဆ ဇ ဈ ည ဋ ဌ ဍ ဎ ဏ တ ထ ဒ ဓ န ပ ဖ ဗ ဘ မ ယ ရ လ ဝ သ ဟ ဠ အ
Bopomofo	ㄅ ㄆ ㄇ ㄈ ㄉ ㄊ ㄋ ㄌ ㄍ ㄎ ㄏ ㄐ ㄑ ㄒ ㄓ ㄔ ㄕ ㄖ ㄗ ㄘ ㄙ ㄚ ㄛ ㄜ ㄝ ㄞ ㄟ ㄠ ㄡ ㄢ ㄣ ㄤ ㄥ ㄦ ㄧ ㄨ ㄩ ㄭ
Ogham	ᚁ ᚂ ᚃ ᚄ ᚅ ᚆ ᚇ ᚈ ᚉ ᚊ ᚋ ᚌ ᚍ ᚎ ᚏ ᚐ ᚑ ᚒ ᚓ ᚔ ᚕ ᚖ ᚗ ᚘ ᚙ ᚚ ᚛ ᚜
Ethiopic	ሀ ለ ሐ መ ሠ ረ ሰ ሸ ቀ በ ተ ቸ ኀ ነ ኘ አ ከ ኸ ወ ዐ ዘ ዠ የ ደ ጀ ገ ጠ ጨ ጰ ጸ ፀ ፈ ፐ
Tifinagh (Amazigh alphabet)	ⴰ, ⴱ, ⵛ, ⴷ, ⴹ, ⴻ, ⴼ, ⴳ, ⴳⵯ, ⵀ, ⵃ, ⵉ, ⵊ, ⴽ, ⴽⵯ, ⵍ, ⵎ, ⵏ, ⵓ, ⵄ, ⵖ, ⵅ, ⵇ, ⵔ, ⵕ, ⵙ, ⵚ, ⵜ, ⵟ, ⵡ, ⵢ, ⵣ, ⵥ
Meetei Mayek	ꯀ, ꯁ, ꯂ, ꯃ, ꯄ, ꯅ, ꯆ, ꯇ, ꯈ, ꯉ, ꯊ, ꯋ, ꯌ, ꯍ, ꯎ, ꯏ, ꯐ, ꯑ, ꯒ, ꯓ, ꯔ, ꯕ, ꯖ, ꯗ, ꯘ, ꯙ, ꯚ, ꯛ, ꯜ, ꯝ, ꯞ, ꯟ, ꯠ, ꯡ, ꯢ, ꯥ, ꯤ, ꯨ, ꯦ, ꯣ, ꯩ, ꯧ, ꯪ

== See also ==
- Abecedarium – Inscription consisting of the letters of an alphabet
- Constructed script – Writing system specifically created by an individual or group
- Character (computing) – Symbols encoded in computers to make text
- Collation – Assembly of written information into a standard order
- Diacritic – Modifier mark added to a letter
- Glyph – Purposeful written mark
- History of the alphabet
- Ligature (writing) – Glyph combining two or more letterforms
- Orthography – Set of conventions for written language
- Typeface – Set of characters that share common design features
- Typography – Art of arranging type
