= Ayin =

Sixteenth letter of many Semitic alphabets

← Samekh Ayin Pe →
- Phoenician: 𐤏
- Hebrew: ע
- Samaritan: ࠏ
- Aramaic: 𐡏
- Syriac: ܥ
- Nabataean: 𐢗
- Arabic: ع
- South Arabian: 𐩲
- Geʽez: ዐ
- North Arabian: 𐪒
- Ugaritic: 𐎓
- Phonemic representation: ʕ, (ʔ)
- Position in alphabet: 16
- Numerical value: 70

Alphabetic derivatives of the Phoenician
- Greek: Ο, Ω
- Latin: O, Ƹ, Ꞷ, ʘ
- Cyrillic: О, Ѡ

Ayin (also ayn or ain; transliterated ⟨ʿ ⟩) is the sixteenth letter of the Semitic scripts, including Phoenician ʿayin 𐤏, Hebrew ʿayin ע, Aramaic ʿē 𐡏, Syriac ʿē ܥ, and Arabic ʿayn ع (where it is sixteenth in abjadi order only). (Note: ﻉ comes eighteenth in the hijaʾi order of Arabic and twenty-first in the Persian alphabet.) It is related to the Ancient North Arabian 𐪒, South Arabian 𐩲, and Ge'ez ዐ.

The letter represents a voiced pharyngeal fricative (/ʕ/) or a similarly articulated consonant. In some Semitic languages and dialects, the phonetic value of the letter has changed, or the phoneme has been lost altogether. In the revived Modern Hebrew it is reduced to a glottal stop or is omitted entirely, in part due to Ashkenazi European influence and their difficulty in pronouncing the consonant.

The Phoenician letter is the origin of the Greek, Latin and Cyrillic letters O, O and O. It is also the origin of the Armenian letters Ո and Օ.

The Arabic character is the origin of the Latin-script letter Ƹ.

== Origins ==
The letter name is derived from the Proto-Sinaitic letter *ʿayn- "eye" (as in Biblical Hebrew עַיִן (ayn) 'eye'), and the Phoenician letter had the shape of a circle or oval, clearly representing an eye, perhaps ultimately derived from the ı͗r hieroglyph 𓁹 (Gardiner D4).

The Phoenician letter gave rise to the Greek Ο, (Note: This is confirmed by the text of the so-called Letter Tragedy of the fifth-century BCE comic poet Callias, and also by a passage in Plato's Cratylus, where Socrates states: [W]hen we speak of the letters of the alphabet, you know, we speak their names, not merely the letters themselves, except in the case of four: E, Y, O, and Ω.) Latin O, and Cyrillic О, all representing vowels. It also gave rise to the Greek letter omega as well as its Cyrillic counterpart. The sound represented by ayin is common to much of the Afroasiatic language family, such as in the Egyptian language, the Cushitic languages and the Semitic languages.

== Arabic ʿayn ==
ʿayn عين
- ع

Usage
- Writing system: Arabic script
- Type: Abjad
- Language of origin: Arabic language
- Sound values: ʕ, ʁ (Kazakh, Kyrgyz)
- Alphabetical position: 18

History
Development
D4
          - ع

Other
- Writing direction: Right-to-left

The Arabic letter ﻉ ﻋَﻴْﻦْ ʿayn /ʕajn/ is the eighteenth letter of the alphabet. It is written in one of several ways depending on its position in the word:

Position in word:	Isolated	Final	Medial	Initial
Glyph form: (Help)	ع	ـع	ـعـ	عـ

=== Pronunciation ===
Arabic ʿayn is one of the most common letters in Arabic. Depending on the region, it ranges from a pharyngeal [ʕ] to an epiglottal [ʢ]. It is voiced, its voiceless counterpart being ح. Due to its position as the innermost letter to emerge from the throat, al-Khalil ibn Ahmad al-Farahidi, who wrote the first Arabic dictionary, actually started writing his Kitab al-'Ayn ('The Book of ʿAyn') with ʿayn as the first letter instead of the eighteenth; he viewed its origins deep down in the throat as a sign that it was the first sound, the essential sound, the voice and a representation of the self.

In the Persian language and other languages using the Persian alphabet, this letter has a different function and represents a glottal stop /ʔ/, or /ʁ/ in Tatar language.

As in Hebrew, the letter originally stood for two sounds, /ʕ/ and voiced uvular fricative /ʁ/. When pointing was developed, /ʁ/ was distinguished with a dot on top غ.

In Maltese, which is written with the Latin alphabet, the digraph għ, called għajn, is used to write what was originally the same sound.

Because the sound is difficult for many non-native speakers to pronounce, it is often used as a shibboleth by native Arabic speakers; other sounds, such as ح and ض are also used.

It is typically represented with the numeral 3 in the Arabic chat alphabet.

In languages such as Kazakh and Kyrgyz, it represents /ʁ/.

=== Southeast Asian nga ===
In some languages of Southeast Asia, the letter nga is used. The letter is derived from the letter ʿayn, via the derived letter ghayn, and it is thus written as:

Position in word:	Isolated	Final	Medial	Initial
Glyph form: (Help)	ڠ	ـڠ	ـڠـ	ڠـ

This letter, derived from ghayn (غ), is used to represent /ŋ/ in:

- the Jawi script, for
  - Acehnese
  - Banjarese
  - Kerinci
  - Maguindanaon
  - Malay
  - Minangkabau
  - Tausūg
  - Ternate
- the Pegon script, for
  - Javanese
  - Sundanese
- Arabic Afrikaans, for Afrikaans historically, called ngīn ([ŋiːn])

=== Wolof ngōn ===
In the Wolofal alphabet, for writing Wolof in Arabic script, the letter ngōn is used, and it is thus written as:

Position in word:	Isolated	Final	Medial	Initial
Glyph form: (Help)	ݝ	ـݝ	ـݝـ	ݝـ

This letter is also derived from the letter ʿayn, via the derived letter ghayn. It represents /ŋ/.

=== Tamil nga ===
Position in word:	Isolated	Final	Medial	Initial
Glyph form: (Help)	ࢳ	ـࢳ	ـࢳـ	ࢳـ

This letter is also derived from the letter ʿayn, via the derived letter ghayn, with three dots inside the descender, to represent /ŋ/ in the Arwi script used for Tamil.

=== Related characters ===
For the related characters, see ng (Arabic letter) and ghayn.

== Hebrew ayin ==
Orthographic variants
Various print fonts			Cursive Hebrew	Solitreo	Rashi script
Serif	Sans-serif	Monospaced	Cursive Hebrew	Solitreo	Rashi script
ע	ע	ע			

Hebrew spelling: עַיִן

=== Phonetic representation ===
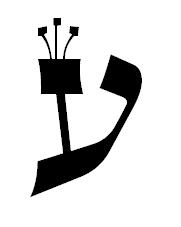

ʿayin has traditionally been described as a voiced pharyngeal fricative ([ʕ]). However, this may be imprecise. Although a pharyngeal fricative has occasionally been observed for ʿayin in Arabic and so may occur in Hebrew as well, the sound is more commonly epiglottal ([ʢ]), and may also be a pharyngealized glottal stop ([ʔˤ]).

In some historical Sephardi and Ashkenazi pronunciations, ʿayin represented a velar nasal ([ŋ]). Remnants can be found in the Yiddish pronunciations of some words such as /ˈjaŋkəv/ and /ˈmansə/ from Hebrew יַעֲקֹב (yaʿăqōḇ, "Jacob") and מַעֲשֶׂה (maʿăse, "story"), but in other cases, the nasal has disappeared and been replaced by /j/, such as /ˈmajsə/ and /ˈmajrəv/ from Hebrew מַעֲשֶׂה and מַעֲרָב (maʿărāḇ, "west"). In Israeli Hebrew (except for Mizrahi pronunciations), it represents a glottal stop in certain cases but is usually silent (it behaves the same as aleph). However, changes in adjoining vowels often testify to the former presence of a pharyngeal or epiglottal articulation. Additionally, it may be used as a shibboleth to identify the ethnolinguistic background of a Hebrew-speaker, as most Israeli Arab and some of Israel's Mizrahi Jews (mainly Yemenite Jews) use the more traditional pronunciation, while other Hebrew-speakers pronounce it similar to Aleph.

Ayin is also one of the three letters that can take a furtive patach (patach ganuv). In Hebrew loanwords in Greek and Latin, ʿayin is sometimes reflected as /g/, since the biblical phonemes /ʕ/ (or "ʿ") and /ʁ/ (represented by "g") were both represented in Hebrew writing by the letter ʿayin (see Ġain). Gomorrah is from the original /ʁamora/ (modern ʿAmora) and Gaza from the original /ʁazza/ (ʿaza) (cf. Arabic غزة Ġazzah, IPA: [ˈɣazza].) In Yiddish, the ʿayin is used to write the vowel e when it is not part of the diphthong ey.

=== Significance ===
In gematria, ʿayin represents the number 70.

ʿayin is also one of the seven letters which receive special crowns (called tagin) when written in a sefer Torah.

== Syriac e ==
Position in word:	Isolated	Final	Medial	Initial
Glyph form: (Help)	ܥ	ـܥ	ـܥـ	ܥـ

== Transliteration ==
In Semitic philology, there is a long-standing tradition of rendering Semitic ayin with the Greek rough breathing mark ⟨῾⟩ (e.g. ῾arab عَرَب Arabs). Depending on typography, this could look similar to either an articulate single opening quotation mark ⟨ʻ⟩ (e.g. ʻarab عَرَب). or as a raised semi-circle open to the right ⟨ʿ⟩ (e.g. ʿarab عَرَب). (Note: Sometimes rendered as the Greek diacritic in a serif font (as ⟨ ̔ ⟩), e.g. Carl Brockelmann's Grundriss Der Vergleichenden Grammatik der semitischen Sprachen, 1908; Friedrich Delitzsch, Paul Haupt (eds.), Beiträge zur assyriologie und semitischen sprachwissenschaft (1890) (1968 reprint); sometimes rendered as a semi-circle open to the right with constant line thickness (as ⟨ʿ⟩), e.g. Theodor Nöldeke, Beiträge zur semitischen Sprachwissenschaft (1904).)

This is by analogy to the transliteration of alef (glottal stop, hamza) by the Greek smooth breathing mark ⟨᾽⟩, rendered as single closing quotation mark or as raised semi-circle open to the left. This convention has been adopted by DIN in 1982 and by ISO in 1984 for Arabic (DIN 31635, ISO 233) and Hebrew (DIN 31636, ISO 259).

The shape of the "raised semi-circle" for ayin ⟨ʿ⟩ and alef ⟨ʾ⟩ was adopted by the Encyclopedia of Islam (edited 1913–1938, 1954–2005, and from 2007), and from there by the International Journal of Middle East Studies. This convention has since also been followed by ISO (ISO 233-2 and ISO 259-2, 1993/4) and by DIN in 1982. A notable exception remains, ALA-LC (1991), the system used by the Library of Congress, continues to recommend modifier letter turned comma ⟨ʻ⟩ (for Hebrew) or left single quotation mark ⟨‘⟩ (for Arabic).

The symbols for the corresponding phonemes in the International Phonetic Alphabet, ⟨ʕ⟩ for voiced pharyngeal fricative (ayin) and ⟨ʔ⟩ for glottal stop (alef) were adopted in the 1928 revision.

In anglicized Arabic or Hebrew names or in loanwords, ayin is often omitted entirely: Iraq ʿirāq عراق, Arab ʿarab عرب, Saudi suʿūdī سعودي, etc.; Afula ʿăfūlā עֲפוּלָה, Arad ʿărād עֲרָד, etc.

Maltese, which uses a Latin alphabet, the only Semitic language to do so in its standard form, writes the ayin as ⟨għ⟩. It is usually unvocalized in speech. The Somali Latin alphabet and Cypriot Arabic alphabet represents the ayin with the letter ⟨c⟩. The informal way to represent it in Arabic chat alphabet uses the digit ⟨3⟩ as transliteration. An outdated phonological symbol for a voiced pharyngeal fricative, U+01B8 Ƹ LATIN CAPITAL LETTER EZH REVERSED, is based on Arabic ayin.

=== Unicode ===
In Unicode, the raised semi-circle for the transliteration of ayin is U+02BF ʿ MODIFIER LETTER LEFT HALF RING (a character in the Spacing Modifier Letters range, even though it is here not used as a modifier letter but as a full grapheme). (Note: Both characters U+02BE ʾ MODIFIER LETTER RIGHT HALF RING and U+02BF ʿ MODIFIER LETTER LEFT HALF RING have been present since Unicode version 1.0.0 (1991). The relevant code chart specifies the purpose of U+02BF as "transliteration of Arabic ain (voiced pharyngeal fricative); transliteration of Hebrew ayin".) This convention has been adopted by ISO 233-2 (1993) for Arabic and ISO 259-2 (1994) for Hebrew.

There are a number of alternative Unicode characters in use, some of which are easily confused or even considered equivalent in practice:

- U+1FFE ῾ GREEK DASIA, the character used to represent Greek rough breathing,
- U+02BD ʽ MODIFIER LETTER REVERSED COMMA,
- U+2018 ‘ LEFT SINGLE QUOTATION MARK, (Note: recommended by the Library of Congress (loc.gov); deprecated by The European Register of Microform Masters)
- U+02BB ʻ MODIFIER LETTER TURNED COMMA,
- U+0060 ` GRAVE ACCENT, from its use as single opening quotation mark in ASCII environments, used for ayin in ArabTeX.

Letters used to represent ayin:

- a superscript "c" (U+1D9C ᶜ MODIFIER LETTER SMALL C),
- the IPA symbol for pharyngealization (U+02C1 ˁ MODIFIER LETTER REVERSED GLOTTAL STOP or U+02E4 ˤ MODIFIER LETTER SMALL REVERSED GLOTTAL STOP) (Note: deprecated by The European Register of Microform Masters.) or ^{ʕ}, a superscript U+0295 ʕ LATIN LETTER PHARYNGEAL VOICED FRICATIVE, the IPA symbol for voiced pharyngeal fricative,

The phonemes corresponding to alef and ayin in Ancient Egyptian are by convention transliterated by more distinctive signs: Egyptian alef is rendered by two semi-circles open to the left, stacked vertically, and Egyptian ayin is rendered by a single full-width semi-circle open to the right. These characters were introduced in Unicode in version 5.1 (2008, Latin Extended-D range), U+A723 ꜣ LATIN SMALL LETTER EGYPTOLOGICAL ALEF and U+A725 ꜥ LATIN SMALL LETTER EGYPTOLOGICAL AIN.

== Character encodings ==
Character information
Preview	ע		ﬠ		ܥ		ࠏ	
Unicode name	HEBREW LETTER AYIN		HEBREW LETTER; ALTERNATIVE AYIN		SYRIAC LETTER E		SAMARITAN LETTER IN	
Encodings	decimal	hex	dec	hex	dec	hex	dec	hex
Unicode	1506	U+05E2	64288	U+FB20	1829	U+0725	2063	U+080F
UTF-8	215 162	D7 A2	239 172 160	EF AC A0	220 165	DC A5	224 160 143	E0 A0 8F
Numeric character reference	&#1506;	&#x5E2;	&#64288;	&#xFB20;	&#1829;	&#x725;	&#2063;	&#x80F;

Character information
Preview	ع		ࣖ		ݝ		ݟ	
Unicode name	ARABIC LETTER AIN		ARABIC SMALL HIGH AIN		ARABIC LETTER AIN; WITH TWO DOTS; ABOVE		ARABIC LETTER AIN; WITH TWO DOTS; VERTICALLY ABOVE	
Encodings	decimal	hex	dec	hex	dec	hex	dec	hex
Unicode	1593	U+0639	2262	U+08D6	1885	U+075D	1887	U+075F
UTF-8	216 185	D8 B9	224 163 150	E0 A3 96	221 157	DD 9D	221 159	DD 9F
Numeric character reference	&#1593;	&#x639;	&#2262;	&#x8D6;	&#1885;	&#x75D;	&#1887;	&#x75F;

Character information
Preview	ڠ		ݞ		ࢳ		𐻦	
Unicode name	ARABIC LETTER AIN; WITH THREE DOTS; ABOVE		ARABIC LETTER AIN; WITH THREE DOTS; POINTING DOWNWARDS ABOVE		ARABIC LETTER AIN; WITH THREE DOTS; BELOW		ARABIC CROWN LETTER AIN	
Encodings	decimal	hex	dec	hex	dec	hex	dec	hex
Unicode	1696	U+06A0	1886	U+075E	2227	U+08B3	69350	U+10EE6
UTF-8	218 160	DA A0	221 158	DD 9E	224 162 179	E0 A2 B3	240 144 187 166	F0 90 BB A6
UTF-16	1696	06A0	1886	075E	2227	08B3	55299 57062	D803 DEE6
Numeric character reference	&#1696;	&#x6A0;	&#1886;	&#x75E;	&#2227;	&#x8B3;	&#69350;	&#x10EE6;

Character information
Preview	ᴥ		ᵜ		Ꜥ		ꜥ	
Unicode name	LATIN LETTER AIN		MODIFIER LETTER SMALL AIN		LATIN CAPITAL LETTER; EGYPTOLOGICAL AIN		LATIN SMALL LETTER; EGYPTOLOGICAL AIN	
Encodings	decimal	hex	dec	hex	dec	hex	dec	hex
Unicode	7461	U+1D25	7516	U+1D5C	42788	U+A724	42789	U+A725
UTF-8	225 180 165	E1 B4 A5	225 181 156	E1 B5 9C	234 156 164	EA 9C A4	234 156 165	EA 9C A5
Numeric character reference	&#7461;	&#x1D25;	&#7516;	&#x1D5C;	&#42788;	&#xA724;	&#42789;	&#xA725;

Character information
Preview	Ƹ		ƹ	
Unicode name	LATIN CAPITAL LETTER; EZH REVERSED		LATIN SMALL LETTER; EZH REVERSED	
Encodings	decimal	hex	dec	hex
Unicode	440	U+01B8	441	U+01B9
UTF-8	198 184	C6 B8	198 185	C6 B9
Numeric character reference	&#440;	&#x1B8;	&#441;	&#x1B9;

Character information
Preview	𐼒		𐼓		𐼘		𐼽		𐽀	
Unicode name	OLD SOGDIAN LETTER AYIN		OLD SOGDIAN LETTER; ALTERNATE AYIN		OLD SOGDIAN LETTER; RESH-AYIN-DALETH		SOGDIAN LETTER AYIN		SOGDIAN LETTER RESH-AYIN	
Encodings	decimal	hex	dec	hex	dec	hex	dec	hex	dec	hex
Unicode	69394	U+10F12	69395	U+10F13	69400	U+10F18	69437	U+10F3D	69440	U+10F40
UTF-8	240 144 188 146	F0 90 BC 92	240 144 188 147	F0 90 BC 93	240 144 188 152	F0 90 BC 98	240 144 188 189	F0 90 BC BD	240 144 189 128	F0 90 BD 80
UTF-16	55299 57106	D803 DF12	55299 57107	D803 DF13	55299 57112	D803 DF18	55299 57149	D803 DF3D	55299 57152	D803 DF40
Numeric character reference	&#69394;	&#x10F12;	&#69395;	&#x10F13;	&#69400;	&#x10F18;	&#69437;	&#x10F3D;	&#69440;	&#x10F40;

Character information
Preview	𐎓		𐡏		𐤏		Ⲵ		ⲵ	
Unicode name	UGARITIC; LETTER AIN		IMPERIAL ARAMAIC; LETTER AYIN		PHOENICIAN; LETTER AIN		COPTIC CAPITAL LETTER; OLD COPTIC AIN		COPTIC SMALL LETTER; OLD COPTIC AIN	
Encodings	decimal	hex	dec	hex	dec	hex	dec	hex	dec	hex
Unicode	66451	U+10393	67663	U+1084F	67855	U+1090F	11444	U+2CB4	11445	U+2CB5
UTF-8	240 144 142 147	F0 90 8E 93	240 144 161 143	F0 90 A1 8F	240 144 164 143	F0 90 A4 8F	226 178 180	E2 B2 B4	226 178 181	E2 B2 B5
UTF-16	55296 57235	D800 DF93	55298 56399	D802 DC4F	55298 56591	D802 DD0F	11444	2CB4	11445	2CB5
Numeric character reference	&#66451;	&#x10393;	&#67663;	&#x1084F;	&#67855;	&#x1090F;	&#11444;	&#x2CB4;	&#11445;	&#x2CB5;

Character information
Preview	𐭏		𐭥		𐮅		ჺ		Ჺ	
Unicode name	INSCRIPTIONAL PARTHIAN; LETTER AYIN		INSCRIPTIONAL PAHLAVI; LETTER WAW-AYIN-RESH		PSALTER PAHLAVI LETTER; WAW-AYIN-RESH		GEORGIAN LETTER AIN		GEORGIAN MTAVRULI; CAPITAL LETTER AIN	
Encodings	decimal	hex	dec	hex	dec	hex	dec	hex	dec	hex
Unicode	68431	U+10B4F	68453	U+10B65	68485	U+10B85	4346	U+10FA	7354	U+1CBA
UTF-8	240 144 173 143	F0 90 AD 8F	240 144 173 165	F0 90 AD A5	240 144 174 133	F0 90 AE 85	225 131 186	E1 83 BA	225 178 186	E1 B2 BA
UTF-16	55298 57167	D802 DF4F	55298 57189	D802 DF65	55298 57221	D802 DF85	4346	10FA	7354	1CBA
Numeric character reference	&#68431;	&#x10B4F;	&#68453;	&#x10B65;	&#68485;	&#x10B85;	&#4346;	&#x10FA;	&#7354;	&#x1CBA;

Character information
Preview	𐫙		ࡘ		𐢗		𐪒		𐡰	
Unicode name	MANICHAEAN LETTER AYIN		MANDAIC LETTER AIN		NABATAEAN LETTER AYIN		OLD NORTH ARABIAN LETTER AIN		PALMYRENE LETTER AYIN	
Encodings	decimal	hex	dec	hex	dec	hex	dec	hex	dec	hex
Unicode	68313	U+10AD9	2136	U+0858	67735	U+10897	68242	U+10A92	67696	U+10870
UTF-8	240 144 171 153	F0 90 AB 99	224 161 152	E0 A1 98	240 144 162 151	F0 90 A2 97	240 144 170 146	F0 90 AA 92	240 144 161 176	F0 90 A1 B0
UTF-16	55298 57049	D802 DED9	2136	0858	55298 56471	D802 DC97	55298 56978	D802 DE92	55298 56432	D802 DC70
Numeric character reference	&#68313;	&#x10AD9;	&#2136;	&#x858;	&#67735;	&#x10897;	&#68242;	&#x10A92;	&#67696;	&#x10870;

Character information
Preview	𐼒		𐼓		𐼘		𐼽		𐽀	
Unicode name	OLD SOGDIAN LETTER AYIN		OLD SOGDIAN LETTER; ALTERNATE AYIN		OLD SOGDIAN LETTER; RESH-AYIN-DALETH		SOGDIAN LETTER AYIN		SOGDIAN LETTER RESH-AYIN	
Encodings	decimal	hex	dec	hex	dec	hex	dec	hex	dec	hex
Unicode	69394	U+10F12	69395	U+10F13	69400	U+10F18	69437	U+10F3D	69440	U+10F40
UTF-8	240 144 188 146	F0 90 BC 92	240 144 188 147	F0 90 BC 93	240 144 188 152	F0 90 BC 98	240 144 188 189	F0 90 BC BD	240 144 189 128	F0 90 BD 80
UTF-16	55299 57106	D803 DF12	55299 57107	D803 DF13	55299 57112	D803 DF18	55299 57149	D803 DF3D	55299 57152	D803 DF40
Numeric character reference	&#69394;	&#x10F12;	&#69395;	&#x10F13;	&#69400;	&#x10F18;	&#69437;	&#x10F3D;	&#69440;	&#x10F40;

Character information
Preview	𐿯		𐿀	
Unicode name	ELYMAIC LETTER AYIN		CHORASMIAN LETTER AYIN	
Encodings	decimal	hex	dec	hex
Unicode	69615	U+10FEF	69568	U+10FC0
UTF-8	240 144 191 175	F0 90 BF AF	240 144 191 128	F0 90 BF 80
UTF-16	55299 57327	D803 DFEF	55299 57280	D803 DFC0
Numeric character reference	&#69615;	&#x10FEF;	&#69568;	&#x10FC0;

== See also ==
- Transliteration of Ancient Egyptian
- Ng (Arabic letter)
- Ghayn
- Gaf
- Għ
- Cyrillic Ghayn, used for several Central Asian languages
