= U (Armenian) =

Letter in the Armenian alphabet

- ՈՒ Ու ու

Usage
- Writing system: Armenian script
- Type: Alphabetic
- Language of origin: Armenian language
- Sound values: [u]
- In Unicode: U+0548 U+0552, U+0548 U+0582, U+0578 U+0582
- Alphabetical position: 34

History
- Development: Ո and Ւ: ՈՒ Ու ու
- Time period: 1922 to present
- Transliterations: U

Other
- Associated numbers: None
- Writing direction: Left-to-right

U, Ou, or Ow (uppercase: ՈՒ; title-case: Ու; lowercase: ու; Armenian: ու) is, according to the Armenian orthography reform, the 34th letter of the Armenian alphabet. Even though U was used de facto before the orthography reform, it was not officially part of the alphabet. It represents the close back rounded vowel /u/. It is romanized with the letter U or the digraph Ow. Since this letter was not made by Mesrop Mashtots, it has no numerical value, and because there is no individual letter that represents the "u" sound, it uses a digraph made up of the letter Vo and the letter Hyun (a calque from the Greek digraph ου).

== Computing codes ==
Character information
Preview	Ո		ո	
Unicode name	ARMENIAN CAPITAL LETTER VO		ARMENIAN SMALL LETTER VO	
Encodings	decimal	hex	dec	hex
Unicode	1352	U+0548	1400	U+0578
UTF-8	213 136	D5 88	213 184	D5 B8
Numeric character reference	&#1352;	&#x548;	&#1400;	&#x578;

Character information
Preview	Ւ		ւ	
Unicode name	ARMENIAN CAPITAL LETTER YIWN		ARMENIAN SMALL LETTER YIWN	
Encodings	decimal	hex	dec	hex
Unicode	1362	U+0552	1410	U+0582
UTF-8	213 146	D5 92	214 130	D6 82
Numeric character reference	&#1362;	&#x552;	&#1410;	&#x582;

== Gallery ==
Typographical form

Handwritten form

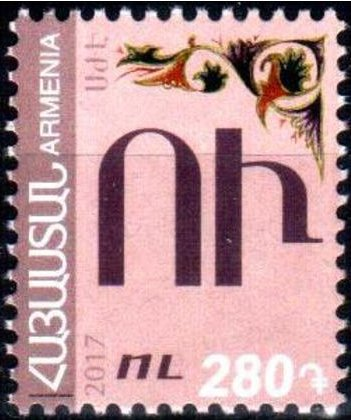
280 dram postage stamp featuring the ՈՒ digraph

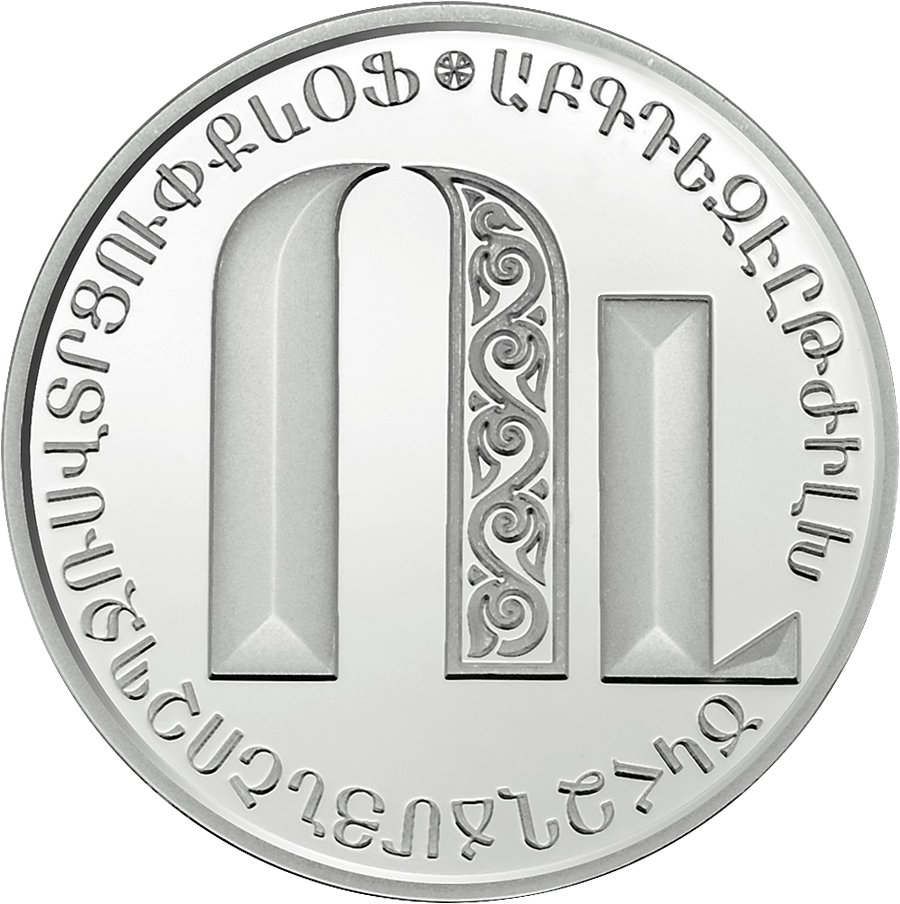
500 dram coin featuring the Ու digraph

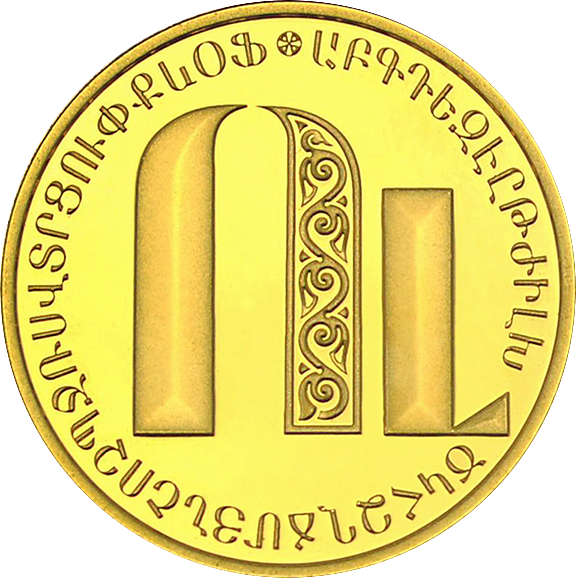
5000 dram coin featuring the Ու digraph

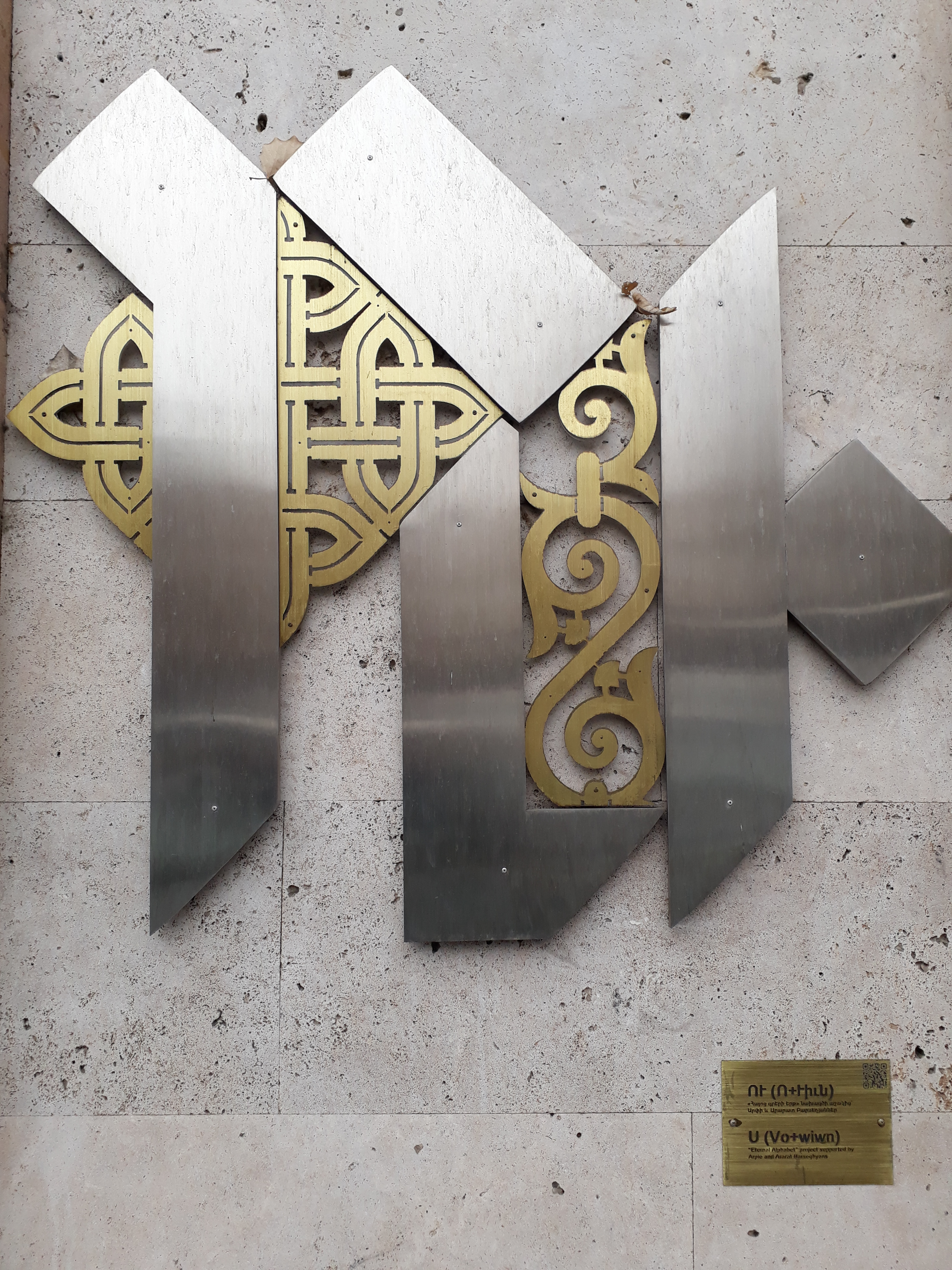

== See also ==
- U (Latin)
- Ո
- Ւ
- և
- Armenian alphabet
- Mesrop Mashtots
