= Ts'o =

Letter in the Armenian alphabet

Tso
- Ց ց

Usage
- Writing system: Armenian script
- Type: Alphabetic
- Language of origin: Armenian language
- Sound values: t͡sʰ
- In Unicode: U+0551, U+0581
- Alphabetical position: 33

History
- Time period: 405 to present

Other
- Associated numbers: 6000
- Writing direction: Left-to-Right

Tsʼo, or Cʼo (majuscule: Ց; minuscule: ց; Reformed orthography: ցո; Classical orthography: ցօ) is the thirty-third letter of the Armenian alphabet. It represents the voiceless aspirated alveolar affricate (/t͡sʰ/) in both Eastern and Western varieties of Armenian. Created by Mesrop Mashtots in the 5th century, it has a numerical value of 6000. Its shape in capital is visually similar to one other Armenian letter, Hi (Յ) or the number 8. Its shape in lowercase is also similar to the minuscule form of the Latin letter G (g). In cursive, both letters are similar to a cursive Y.

== Gallery ==
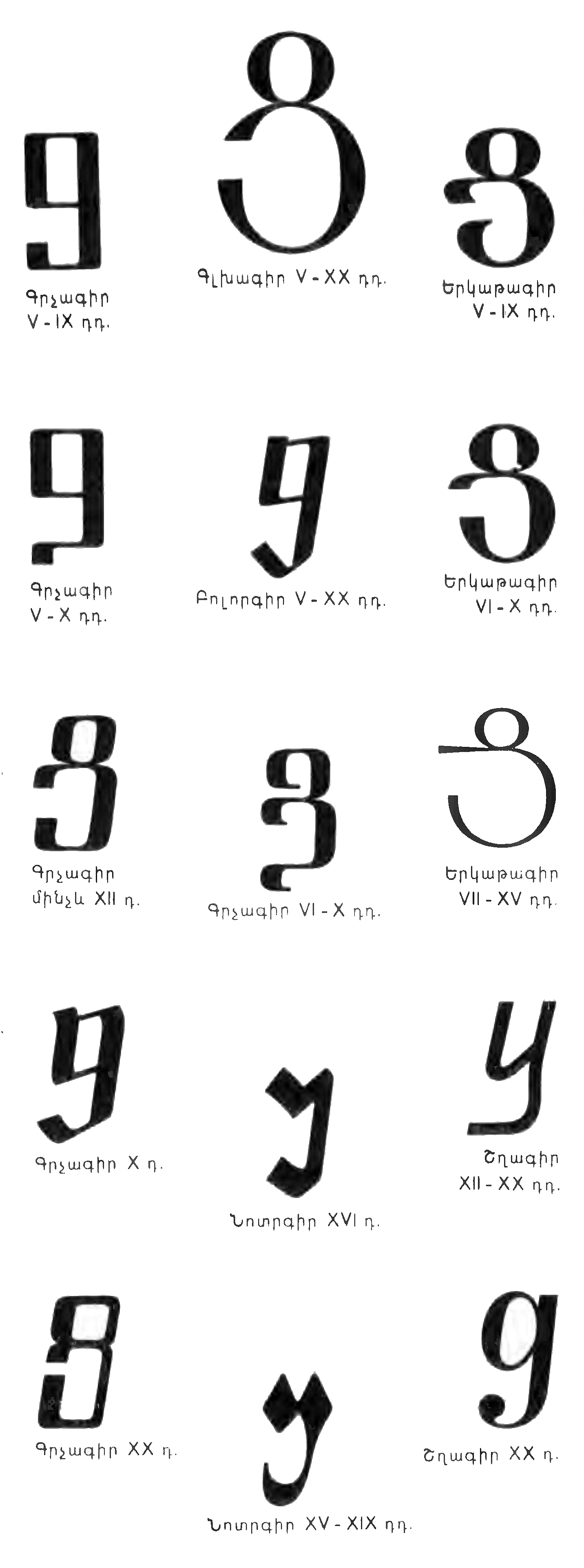
Various historic fonts

Rounded Erkat'agir

Angular Erkat'agir

Bolorgir

Notrgir

Shghagir

Typographic form

Handwritten form

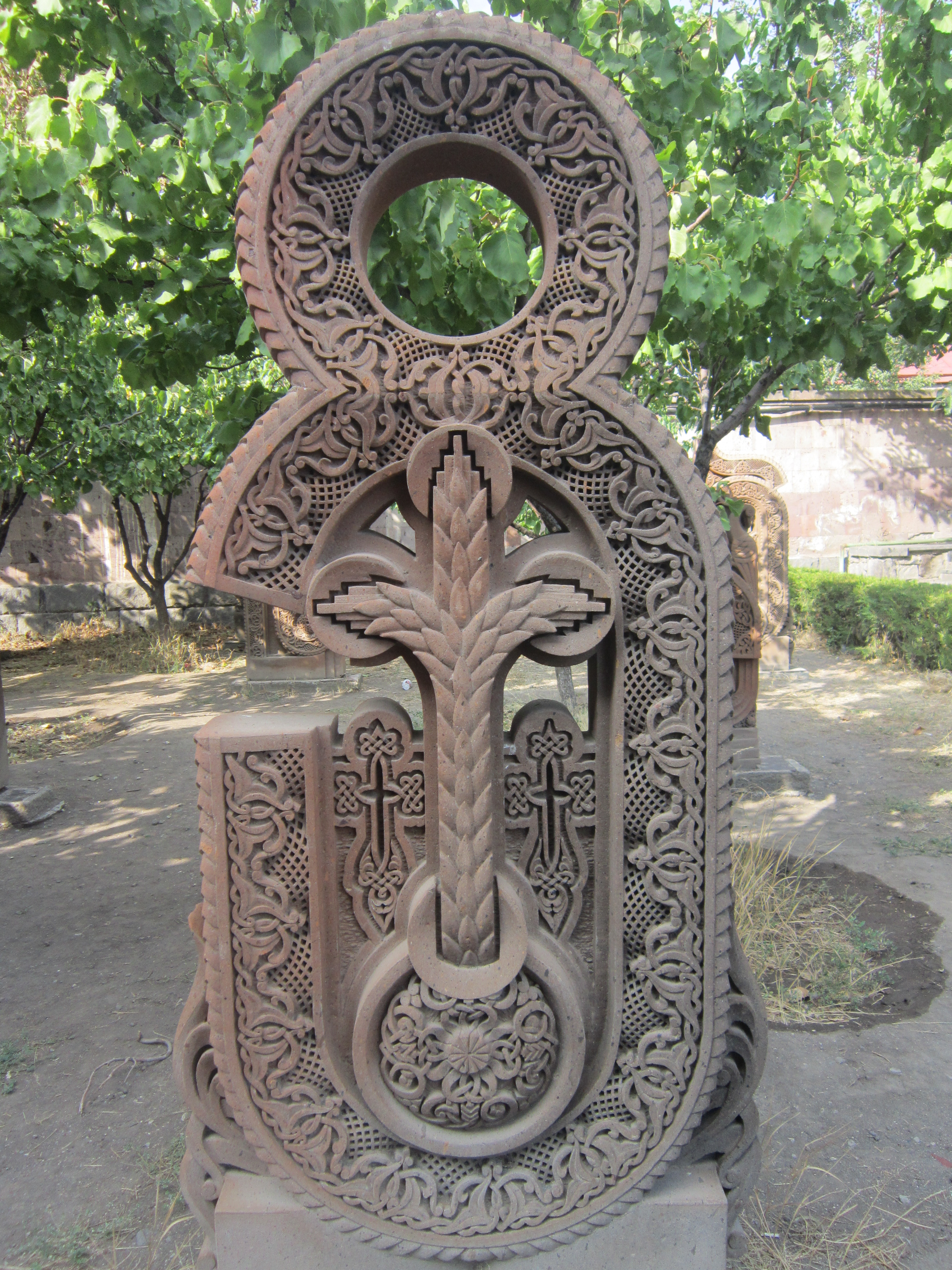
Khachkar in the shape of letter Ց

== Computing codes ==
Character information
| Preview | Ց | | ց | |
|---|---|---|---|---|
| Unicode name | ARMENIAN CAPITAL LETTER CO | | ARMENIAN SMALL LETTER CO | |
| Encodings | decimal | hex | dec | hex |
| Unicode | 1361 | U+0551 | 1409 | U+0581 |
| UTF-8 | 213 145 | D5 91 | 214 129 | D6 81 |
| Numeric character reference | &#1361; | &#x551; | &#1409; | &#x581; |

== See also ==
- Armenian alphabet
- Mesrop Mashtots
- C (Latin)
- G (Latin)
- Յ
- 8
