= Eh (letter) =

Letter in the Armenian alphabet

E
- Է է

Usage
- Writing system: Armenian script
- Type: Alphabetic
- Language of origin: Armenian language
- Sound values: ɛ
- In Unicode: U+0537, U+0567
- Alphabetical position: 7

History
- Time period: 405 to present

Other
- Associated numbers: 7

E, Ē, or Eh (majuscule: Է; minuscule: է; Armenian: է) is the seventh letter of the Armenian alphabet. It represents the open-mid front unrounded vowel (/ɛ/) in Eastern Armenian and the close-mid front unrounded vowel (/e/) Western Armenian. This letter is related the Armenian letter Yečʼ (Ե). After the 20th century spelling reform, the letter is used to write a word initial /ɛ/, while word initial ječʼ (ե) is pronounced /jɛ/. Before the orthography reform, the two letters were used interchangeably. Created by Mesrop Mashtots in the 5th century, it has a numerical value of 7.

In the Armenian Apostolic Church, the letter is used on altars to represent the number 7, which has significant religious meaning.

== Gallery ==
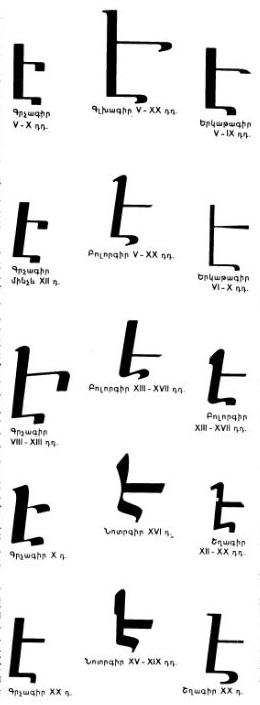
Various historic fonts

Rounded Erkat'agir

Angular Erkat'agir

Bolorgir

Notrgir

Shghagir

Typographic form

Handwritten form

== Computing codes ==
Character information
Preview	Է		է	
Unicode name	ARMENIAN CAPITAL LETTER EH		ARMENIAN SMALL LETTER EH	
Encodings	decimal	hex	dec	hex
Unicode	1335	U+0537	1383	U+0567
UTF-8	212 183	D4 B7	213 167	D5 A7
Numeric character reference	&#1335;	&#x537;	&#1383;	&#x567;

== Notes ==
1.This also appears in compound words

== See also ==
- E (Latin)
