= Ch'a =

Letter in the Armenian alphabet

Cha
- Չ չ

Usage
- Writing system: Armenian script
- Type: Alphabetic
- Language of origin: Armenian language
- Sound values: t͡ʃʰ
- In Unicode: U+0549, U+0579
- Alphabetical position: 25

History
- Time period: 405 to present

Other
- Associated numbers: 700

Cha, or Čʼa (majuscule: Չ; minuscule: չ; Armenian: չա) is the twenty-fifth letter of the Armenian alphabet. It represents the voiceless postalveolar aspirated affricate (/t͡ʃʰ/) in both Eastern and Western varieties of Armenian. Created by Mesrop Mashtots in the 5th century, it has a numerical value of 700. Its shape in capital form is visually similar to one other Armenian letter, Sha (Շ). Its shape in lowercase form is also similar to the Latin letter Z (z).

== Computing codes ==
Character information
Preview	Չ		չ	
Unicode name	ARMENIAN CAPITAL LETTER CHA		ARMENIAN SMALL LETTER CHA	
Encodings	decimal	hex	dec	hex
Unicode	1353	U+0549	1401	U+0579
UTF-8	213 137	D5 89	213 185	D5 B9
Numeric character reference	&#1353;	&#x549;	&#1401;	&#x579;

== Gallery ==
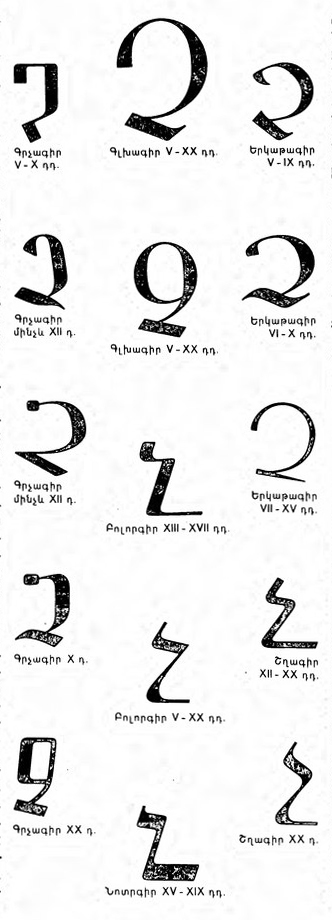
Various historic fonts

Rounded Erkat'agir

Angular Erkat'agir

Bolorgir

Notrgir

Shghagir

Typographic form

Handwritten form

== See also ==
- Z (Latin)
- Č (Latin)
