= Yew (letter) =

Letter in the Armenian alphabet

- և

Usage
- Writing system: Armenian script
- Type: Alphabetic
- Language of origin: Armenian language
- Sound values: [ɛv], [jɛv]
- In Unicode: U+0587
- Alphabetical position: 37

Yew, or Yev (minuscule: և; Armenian: և) is the 37th letter of the reformed Armenian alphabet. It is a ligature of the letters Yech (ե) and Hyun (ւ). Although Yew was used de facto before the orthography reform, it was not officially part of the alphabet.

Unlike the other letters in the Armenian alphabet, it has no numerical value.

== Usage ==
In both varieties of Armenian, it is pronounced as [ɛv], but word-initially, it represents the [jɛv] sound.

This ligature has no majuscule form. When capitalized, it is written as Եվ (reformed orthography) or Եւ (classical orthography).

== Computing codes ==
Character information
Preview	և	
Unicode name	ARMENIAN SMALL LIGATURE ECH YIWN	
Encodings	decimal	hex
Unicode	1415	U+0587
UTF-8	214 135	D6 87
Numeric character reference	&#1415;	&#x587;

== Gallery ==
Handwritten form

Typographic form

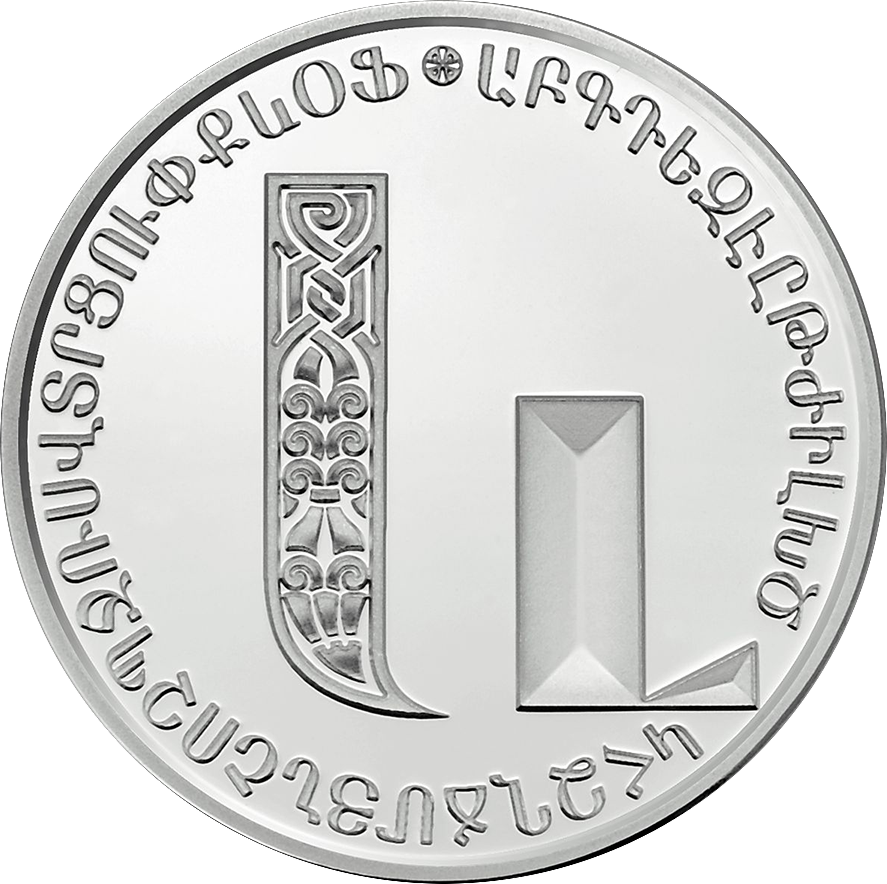
500 dram coin featuring the և ligature

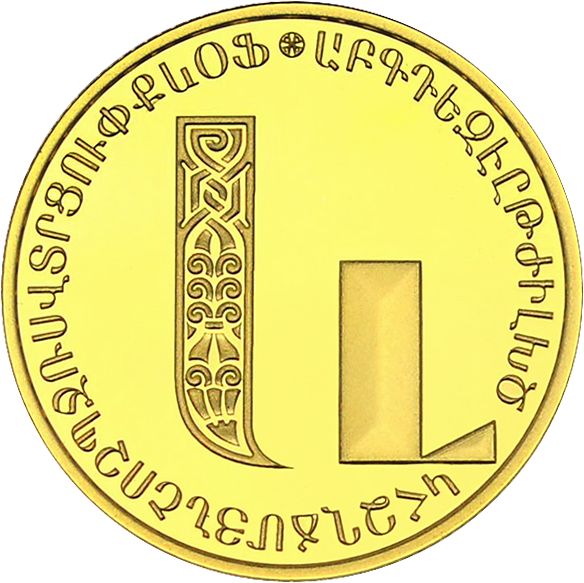
5000 dram coin featuring the և ligature

== Related characters and other similar characters ==
- Ե ե : Armenian letter Yech
- Ւ ւ : Armenian letter Hyun
- U u : Latin letter U

== See also ==
- Armenian alphabet
- Mesrop Mashtots
