= Reversed ezh =

Letter of the Latin alphabet

Reversed eʒ/Ƹayin
- Ƹ ƹ

Usage
- Writing system: Latin script International Phonetic Alphabet
- Type: Alphabetic
- Language of origin: Arabic language Romanization of Arabic
- Sound values: [ʕ]
- In Unicode: U+01B8, U+01B9

History
Development
D4
          - ع ـع ـعـ عـ
            - ع
              - Ƹ ƹ
- Sisters: O Ʒ ߋ ߜ ࠏ ݝ ݟ ڠ ݞ ࢳ ᴥ 𐎓 ჺ ע 𐫙 ࡘ 𐢗 ʕ ʢ

Other
- Writing direction: Left-to-right

Ƹ (minuscule: ƹ) is a letter of the Latin script. It was used for a voiced pharyngeal fricative [ʕ] in the 1940s, 1950s and 1960s, for example by John Rupert Firth and Terence Frederick Mitchell, or in the 1980s by Martin Hinds and El-Said Badawi.

Although it looks like a reversed ezh (Ʒ), it is based on the Arabic letter ʿayn (ع). (Unicode, however, refers to it expressly as "reversed ezh.")

== Bibliography ==
- J. R. Firth (1948). "Sounds and prosodies". Transactions of the Philological Society. 47 (1). 27–152. doi:10.1111/j.1467-968X.1948.tb00556.x.
- Martin Hinds; El-Said Badawi (1986). A dictionary of Egyptian Arabic. Beirut: Librairie du Liban. ISBN 9789953865225.
- T. F. Mitchell (1952). "The Active Participle in an Arabic Dialect of Cyrenaica". Bulletin of the School of Oriental and African Studies. 14 (1). University of London. 11–33. doi:10.1017/S0041977X00084160. JSTOR 608504. S2CID 191614835.
- T. F. Mitchell (1953). "Particle-Noun Complexes in a Berber Dialect (Zuara)". Bulletin of the School of Oriental and African Studies. 15 (2). University of London. 375–390. doi:10.1017/S0041977X00111152. JSTOR 608556. S2CID 122785020.
- T. F. Mitchell (1956). An introduction to Egyptian colloquial Arabic. London: Oxford University Press.
- T. F. Mitchell (1960). "Prominence and Syllabication in Arabic". Bulletin of the School of Oriental and African Studies. 23 (2). University of London. 369–389. doi:10.1017/S0041977X00149997. JSTOR 609703. S2CID 119423726.
- T. F. Mitchell (1962). Colloquial Arabic. London: Teach Yourself Books. ISBN 0-340-05774-2.
- Pullum, Geoffrey K.; Ladusaw, William A. (1996). Phonetic Symbol Guide. Chicago: University of Chicago Press. ISBN 0-226-68535-7.
