= Nu (Armenian) =

Letter in the Armenian alphabet

- Ն ն

Usage
- Writing system: Armenian script
- Type: Alphabetic
- Language of origin: Armenian language
- Sound values: [n] [ŋ]
- In Unicode: U+0546, U+0576
- Alphabetical position: 22

History
- Time period: 405 to present

Other
- Associated numbers: 400
- Writing direction: Left-to-right

Nu, or Now (majuscule: Ն; minuscule: ն; Armenian: նու) is the 22nd letter in the Armenian alphabet. It is pronounced as the voiced alveolar nasal /n/ or the voiced velar nasal /ŋ/ before a velar consonant. It is typically romanized with the letter N. Created by Mesrop Mashtots in the 5th century, it can also represent the number 400 in the Armenian number system.

== Computing codes ==
Character information
Preview	Ն		ն	
Unicode name	ARMENIAN CAPITAL LETTER NOW		ARMENIAN SMALL LETTER NOW	
Encodings	decimal	hex	dec	hex
Unicode	1350	U+0546	1398	U+0576
UTF-8	213 134	D5 86	213 182	D5 B6
Numeric character reference	&#1350;	&#x546;	&#1398;	&#x576;

== Gallery ==
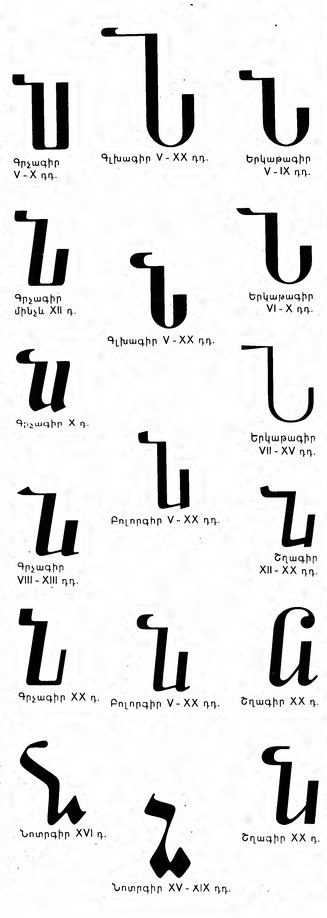
Various historic fonts

Rounded Erkat'agir

Angular Erkat'agir

Bolorgir

Notrgir

Shghagir

Typographic form

Handwritten form

== See also ==
- N (Latin)
- Armenian alphabet
- Mesrop Mashtots
