= Hi (Armenian) =

Armenian letter

- Յ յ

Usage
- Writing system: Armenian script
- Type: Alphabetic
- Language of origin: Armenian language
- Sound values: j, h
- In Unicode: U+0545, U+0575
- Alphabetical position: 21

History
- Time period: 405-present

Other
- Associated numbers: 300
- Writing direction: Left-to-right

Hi, or Yi (uppercase: Յ; lowercase: յ; Armenian: հի; Classical Armenian: յի) is the 21st letter of the Armenian alphabet. It is pronounced as the voiced palatal approximant [j], or the voiceless glottal fricative [h] word-initially and silent word-finally in Classical Armenian orthography. It is typically romanized with the letter H, J or Y. Created by Mesrop Mashtots in the 5th century, it has a numerical value of 300.

== Computing codes ==
Character information
Preview	Յ		յ	
Unicode name	ARMENIAN CAPITAL LETTER YI		ARMENIAN SMALL LETTER YI	
Encodings	decimal	hex	dec	hex
Unicode	1349	U+0545	1397	U+0575
UTF-8	213 133	D5 85	213 181	D5 B5
Numeric character reference	&#1349;	&#x545;	&#1397;	&#x575;

== Gallery ==
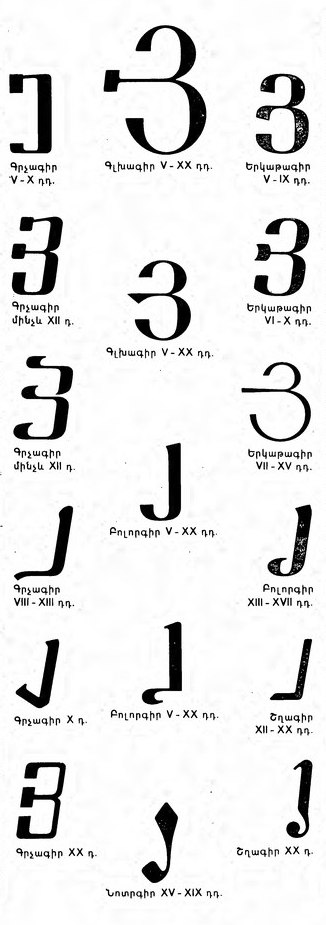
Various historic fonts

Rounded Erkat'agir

Angular Erkat'agir

Bolorgir

Notrgir

Shghagir

Typographic form

Handwritten form
