= Pe (Armenian) =

Letter in the Armenian alphabet

- Պ պ

Usage
- Writing system: Armenian script
- Type: Alphabetic
- Language of origin: Armenian language
- Sound values: p (Eastern Armenian) b (Western Armenian)
- In Unicode: U+057A, U+057A
- Alphabetical position: 26

History
- Time period: 405 to present

Other
- Associated numbers: 800

Pe, or Peh (majuscule: Պ; minuscule: պ; Reformed orthography: պե; Classical orthography: պէ) is the twenty-sixth letter of the Armenian alphabet. It has a numerical value of 800. It was created by Mesrop Mashtots in the 5th century. In Eastern Armenian, it represents the voiceless bilabial stop (/p/) while in Western Armenian, it represents the voiced bilabial stop (/b/).

Its minuscule form is similar in shape to the voiced velar approximant (ɰ) and the Cyrillic letter Cche (Ꚇ ꚇ).

== Gallery ==
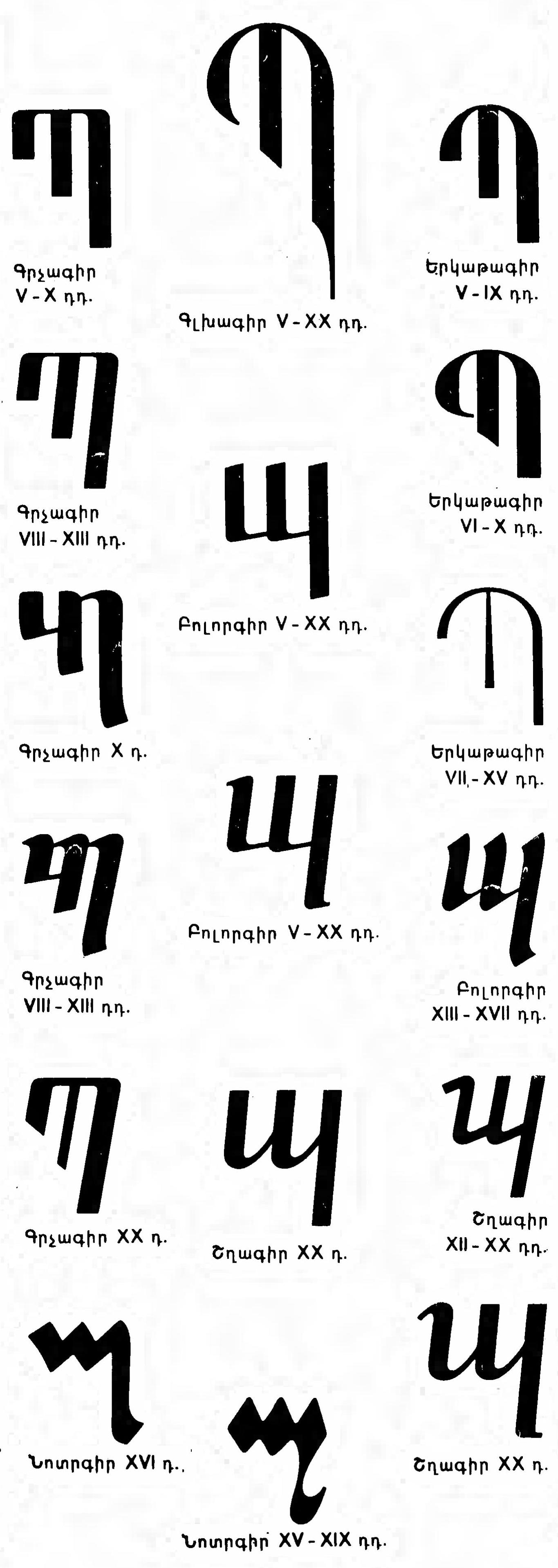
Various historic forms

Rounded Erkat'agir

Angular Erkat'agir

Bolorgir

Notrgir

Shghagir

Typographic form

Handwritten form

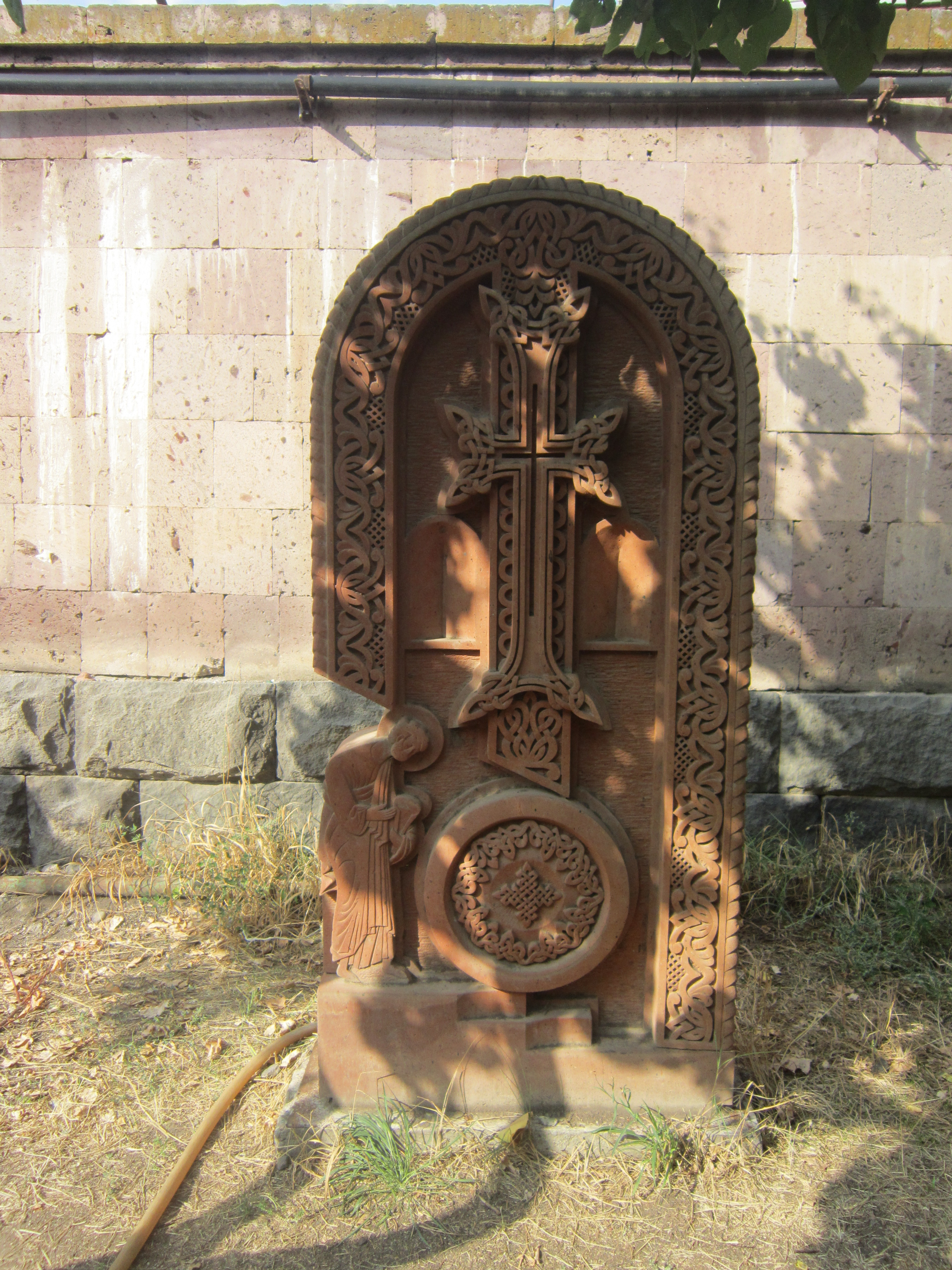
Khachkar in the shape of letter Պ

== Computing codes ==
Character information
Preview	Պ		պ	
Unicode name	ARMENIAN CAPITAL LETTER PEH		ARMENIAN SMALL LETTER PEH	
Encodings	decimal	hex	dec	hex
Unicode	1354	U+054A	1402	U+057A
UTF-8	213 138	D5 8A	213 186	D5 BA
Numeric character reference	&#1354;	&#x54A;	&#1402;	&#x57A;

== See also ==
- Armenian alphabet
- Mesrop Mashtots
- Voiced velar approximant
- P
