= Vo (letter) =

Letter in the Armenian alphabet

- Ո ո

Usage
- Writing system: Armenian script
- Type: Alphabetic
- Language of origin: Armenian language
- Sound values: [ɔ] [vɔ] (word-initially or in isolated form)
- In Unicode: U+0548, U+0578
- Alphabetical position: 24

History
- Time period: 405 to present

Other
- Associated numbers: 600
- Writing direction: Left-to-Right

Vo (majuscule: Ո; minuscule: ո; Armenian: վո, վօ) is the twenty-fourth letter of the Armenian alphabet. It has a numerical value of 600. It was created by Mesrop Mashtots in the 5th century AD. It represents the open-mid back rounded vowel (/ɔ/), but when it occurs isolated or word-initially, it represents /vɔ/^{1}. It is one of the two letters that represent the sound O, the other being Օ which was not created by Mashtots.

Its minuscule variant is homoglyphic to the minuscule form of the Latin letter N. In its uppercase form, it looks like a turned Latin letter U, the Lisu letter Ue (ꓵ), or the asomtavruli form of the Georgian letter ghani (Ⴖ).

== As a component in U ==
This letter, along with Vyun (or Hiwn in Classical Armenian), is part of the Armenian U (ՈՒ Ու ու). Because the letter U is not present in Mashtots's alphabet, it uses a digraph made up of these letters.

== Computing codes ==
Character information
Preview	Ո		ո	
Unicode name	ARMENIAN CAPITAL LETTER VO		ARMENIAN SMALL LETTER VO	
Encodings	decimal	hex	dec	hex
Unicode	1352	U+0548	1400	U+0578
UTF-8	213 136	D5 88	213 184	D5 B8
Numeric character reference	&#1352;	&#x548;	&#1400;	&#x578;

== Gallery ==
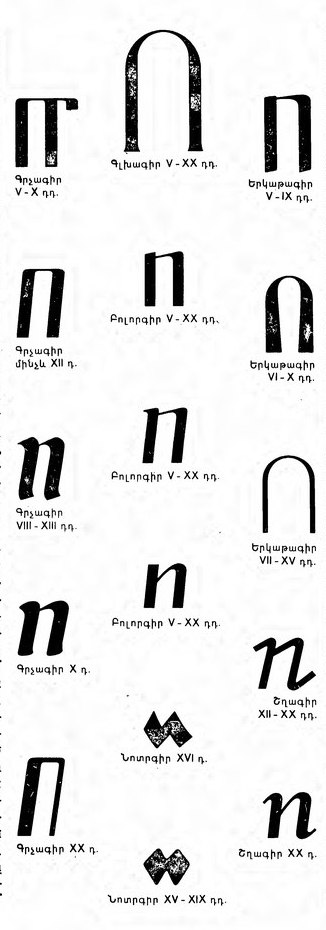
Various historic fonts

Rounded Erkat'agir

Angular Erkat'agir

Bolorgir

Notrgir

Shghagir

Typographic form

Handwritten form

Eastern Armenian

Western Armenian

== Related characters and other similar characters ==
- O o : Latin letter O
- О о : Cyrillic letter O
- Օ օ : Armenian letter O
- ꓵ : Lisu letter Ue
- ՈՒ Ու ու : Armenian letter U
- Ⴖ : Georgian letter Ghani, in asomtavruli form

== See also ==
- Armenian alphabet
- Mesrop Mashtots

== Notes ==
1. Except in ով /ov/ "who" and ովքեր /ovkʰer/ "those (people)" in Eastern Armenian
