= Hyun (letter) =

Letter in the Armenian alphabet

- Ւ ւ

Usage
- Writing system: Armenian script
- Type: Alphabetic
- Language of origin: Armenian language
- Sound values: [v] (Modern) [w] (Classic)
- In Unicode: U+0552, U+0582
- Alphabetical position: 34

History
- Time period: 405 to present
- Transliterations: W

Other
- Associated numbers: 7000
- Writing direction: Left-to-right

Hyun, Hyown, Vyun, Vyown, Yiwn or Hiwn (uppercase: Ւ; minuscule: ւ; Reformed orthography: հյուն, վյուն; Classical orthography: հիւն) is the 34th letter in the Armenian alphabet. It represents the voiced labial–velar approximant /w/ in Classical Armenian and the voiced labiodental fricative /v/ in Modern Armenian. It is typically romanized with the letter W. Created by Mesrop Mashtots in the 5th century, it has a numerical value of 7000.

== As a component in U ==

This letter, along with Vo, is part of the Armenian digraph U (ՈՒ Ու ու). In the reformed Armenian alphabet, U takes the place of Hyun. It represents the close back rounded vowel /u/.

== Computing codes ==
Character information
Preview	Ւ		ւ	
Unicode name	ARMENIAN CAPITAL LETTER YIWN		ARMENIAN SMALL LETTER YIWN	
Encodings	decimal	hex	dec	hex
Unicode	1362	U+0552	1410	U+0582
UTF-8	213 146	D5 92	214 130	D6 82
Numeric character reference	&#1362;	&#x552;	&#1410;	&#x582;

== Gallery ==
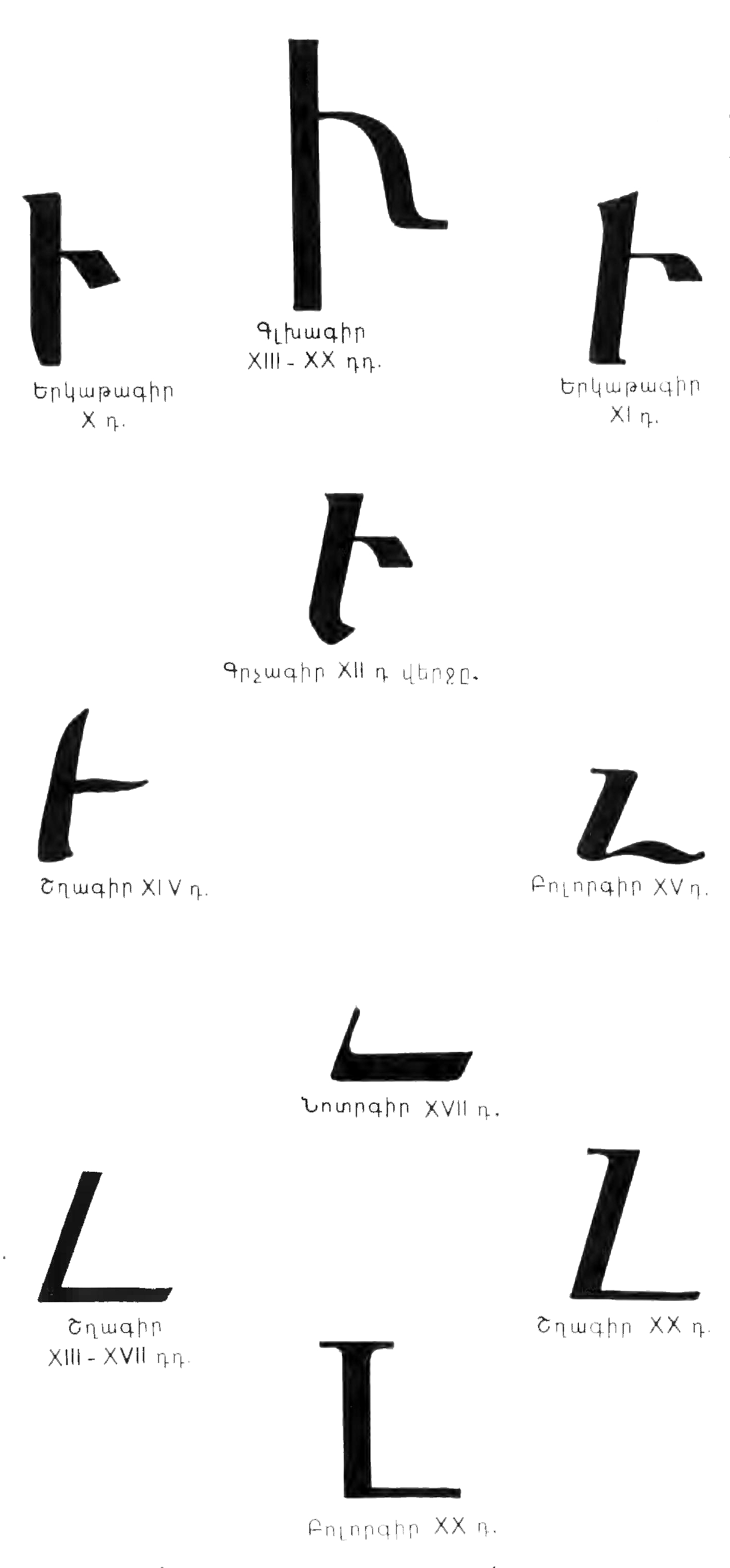
Various historic fonts

Erkat'agir (rounded)

Erkat'agir (angular)

Bolorgir

Notrgir

Shghagir

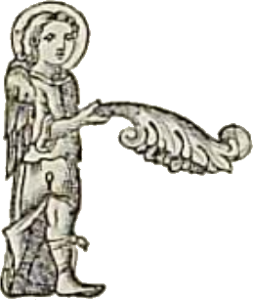
Illuminated letter Ւ

Typographic form

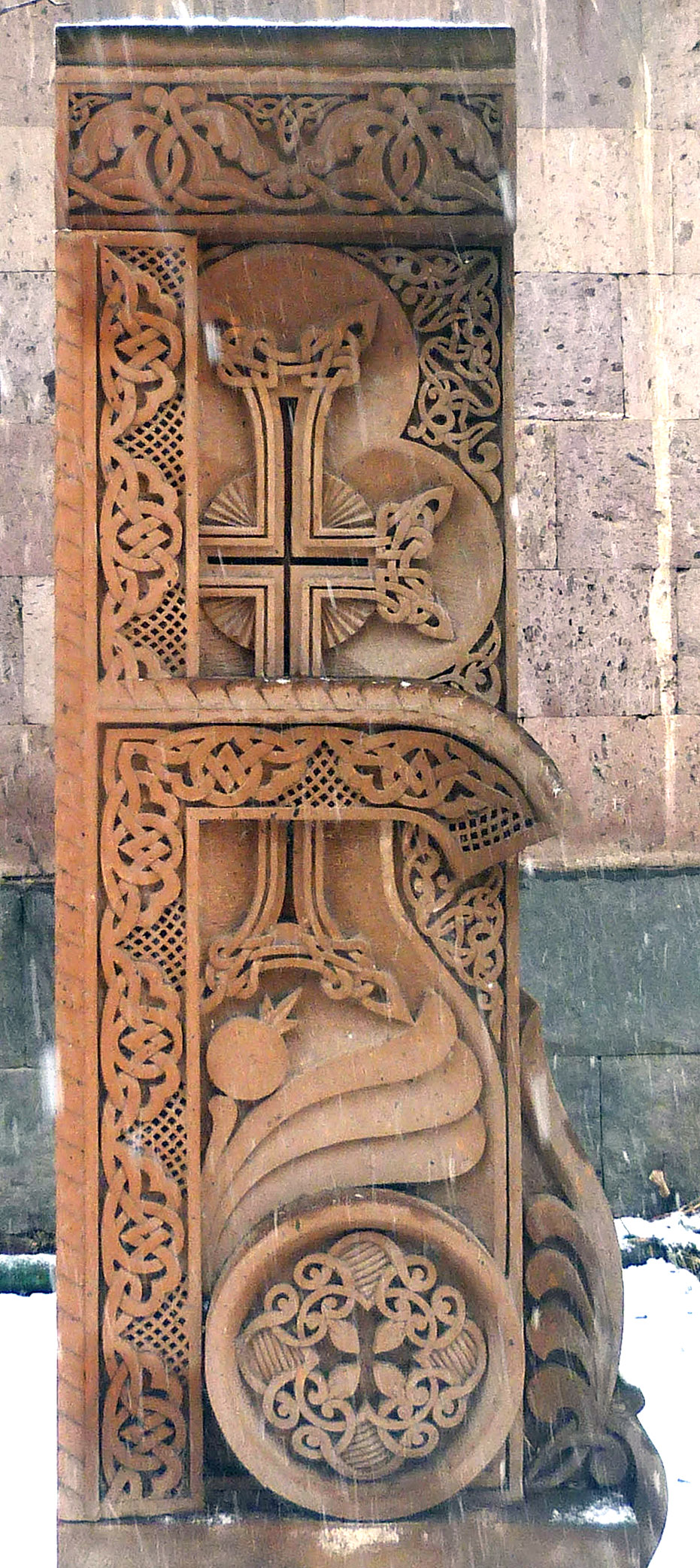
Khachkar in the shape of letter Ւ

Eastern Armenian Braille

Western Armenian Braille

== See also ==
- Armenian alphabet
- Mesrop Mashtots
- Ո
- Ու
- և
- U (Latin)
- V (Latin)
- W (Latin)
