= Sha (Armenian) =

- Շ շ

Usage
- Writing system: Armenian script
- Type: Alphabetic
- Language of origin: Armenian language
- Sound values: ʃ
- In Unicode: U+0547, U+0547
- Alphabetical position: 23

History
- Time period: 405 to present

Other
- Associated numbers: 500
- Writing direction: Left-to-Right

Sha (majuscule: Շ; minuscule: շ; Armenian: շա) is the twenty-third letter of the Armenian alphabet, representing the voiceless postalveolar fricative (/ʃ/) in both Eastern and Western Armenian. It is typically romanized with the digraph Sh. It was part of the alphabet created by Mesrop Mashtots in the 5th century CE. In the Armenian numeral system, it has a value of 500. Its shape in lowercase form is similar to the Arabic numeral 2.

== Gallery ==
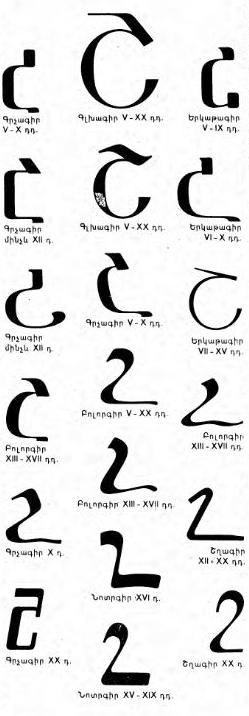
Various historic fonts

Rounded Erkat'agir

Angular Erkat'agir

Bolorgir

Notrgir

Shghagir

Typographic form

Handwritten form

== Character codes ==
Character information
Preview	Շ		Շ	
Unicode name	ARMENIAN CAPITAL LETTER SHA		ARMENIAN SMALL LETTER SHA	
Encodings	decimal	hex	dec	hex
Unicode	1351	U+0547	1351	U+0547
UTF-8	213 135	D5 87	213 135	D5 87
Numeric character reference	&#1351;	&#x547;	&#1351;	&#x547;

== See also ==
- Nu, the letter preceding Sha in the Armenian alphabet
- Armenian alphabet
- Sh (digraph)
