= Yech =

5th letter in the Armenian alphabet

- Ե ե

Usage
- Writing system: Armenian script
- Type: Alphabetic
- Language of origin: Armenian language
- Sound values: [ɛ] [jɛ] (initially)
- In Unicode: U+0535, U+0565
- Alphabetical position: 5

History
- Time period: 405 to present

Other
- Associated numbers: 5

Yech, or Ech (majuscule: Ե; minuscule: ե; Armenian: եչ) is the fifth letter of the Armenian alphabet. It was created by Mesrop Mashtots in the 5th century AD. It has a numerical value of 5. It represents the ([ɛ]) sound, but when it occurs word-initially, it is pronounced as [jɛ].

== Related characters and other similar characters ==
- Е е : Cyrillic letter Ye
- Є є : Cyrillic letter Ukrainian Ye
- E e : Latin letter E
- t : Latin letter T

== Character codes ==
Character information
Preview	Ե		ե	
Unicode name	ARMENIAN CAPITAL LETTER ECH		ARMENIAN SMALL LETTER ECH	
Encodings	decimal	hex	dec	hex
Unicode	1333	U+0535	1381	U+0565
UTF-8	212 181	D4 B5	213 165	D5 A5
Numeric character reference	&#1333;	&#x535;	&#1381;	&#x565;

== Gallery ==
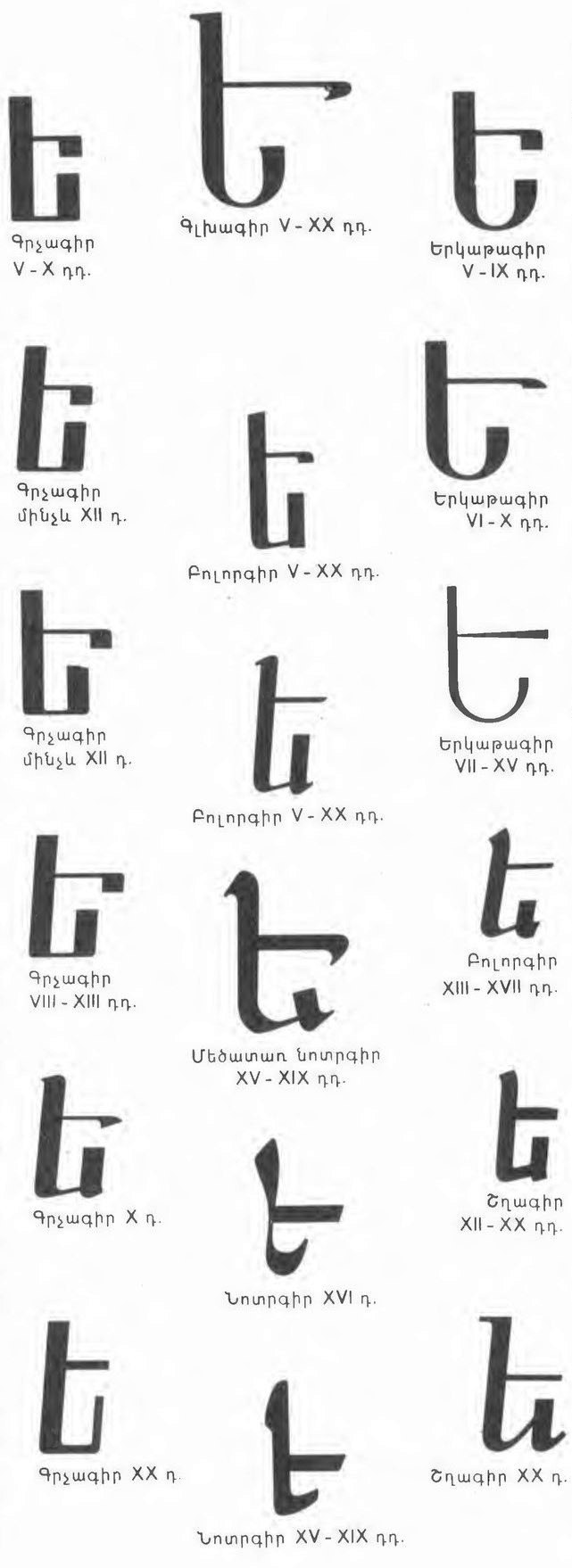
Various historic forms

Rounded Erkat'agir

Angular Erkat'agir

Bolorgir

Notrgir

Shghagir

Typographic form

Handwritten form

Eastern Armenian Braille form Dots-245

Western Armenian Braille form Dots-13456

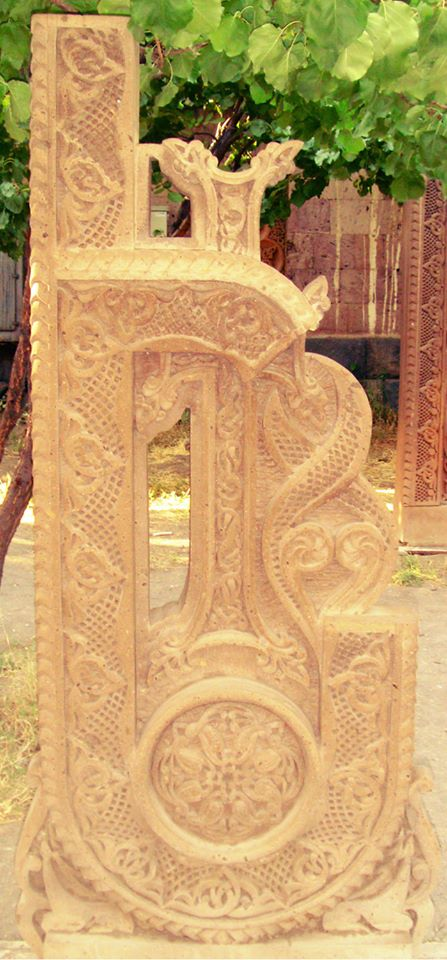
Khachkar «Yech» monument at St. Mesrop Mashtots church in Oshakan

== See also ==
- Armenian alphabet
- Mesrop Mashtots
