= Hebrew (Unicode block) =

- Range: U+0590..U+05FF (112 code points)
- Plane: BMP
- Scripts: Hebrew
- Major alphabets: Hebrew; Yiddish
- Assigned: 90 code points
- Unused: 22 reserved code points
- Source standards: ISO 8859-8

Unicode Version History
- 1.0.0 (1991): 52 (+52)
- 1.0.1 (1992): 51 (−1)
- 2.0 (1996): 82 (+31)
- 4.1 (2005): 86 (+4)
- 5.0 (2006): 87 (+1)
- 11.0 (2018): 88 (+1)
- 18.0 (2026): 90 (+2)

Unicode documentation
- Code chart ∣ Web page
- Note: One character was moved from the Hebrew block to the Alphabetic Presentation Forms block in version 1.0.1 during the process of unifying with ISO 10646.

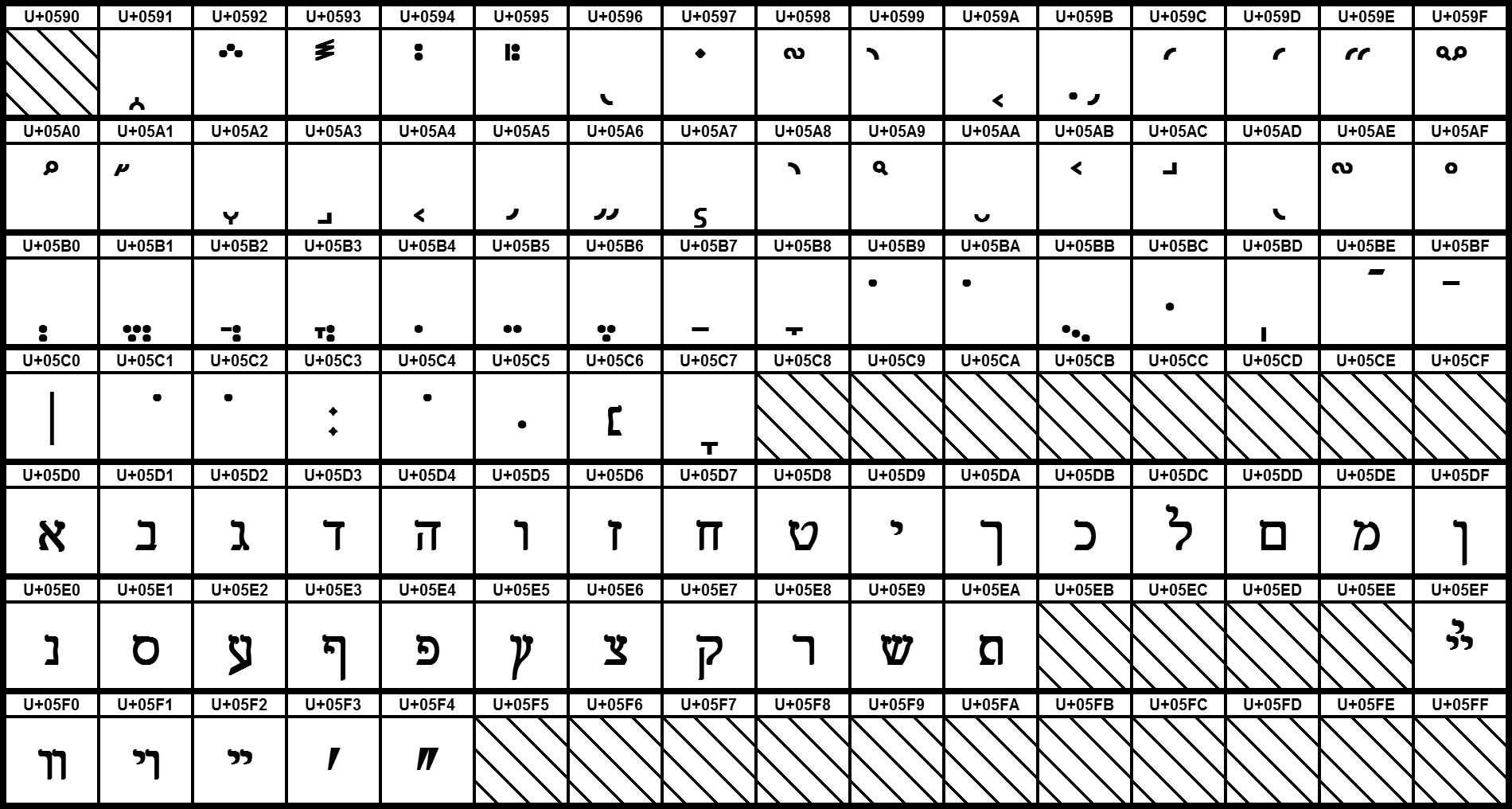
Graphical representation of the Hebrew Unicode block

Hebrew is a Unicode block containing characters for writing the Hebrew, Yiddish, Ladino, and other Jewish diaspora languages.

== Block ==
Hebrew^{[1]}^{[2]} Official Unicode Consortium code chart (PDF)
	0	1	2	3	4	5	6	7	8	9	A	B	C	D	E	F
U+059x		֑	֒	֓	֔	֕	֖	֗	֘	֙	֚	֛	֜	֝	֞	֟
U+05Ax	֠	֡	֢	֣	֤	֥	֦	֧	֨	֩	֪	֫	֬	֭	֮	֯
U+05Bx	ְ	ֱ	ֲ	ֳ	ִ	ֵ	ֶ	ַ	ָ	ֹ	ֺ	ֻ	ּ	ֽ	־	ֿ
U+05Cx	׀	ׁ	ׂ	׃	ׄ	ׅ	׆	ׇ	׈	׉						
U+05Dx	א	ב	ג	ד	ה	ו	ז	ח	ט	י	ך	כ	ל	ם	מ	ן
U+05Ex	נ	ס	ע	ף	פ	ץ	צ	ק	ר	ש	ת					ׯ
U+05Fx	װ	ױ	ײ	׳	״											
Notes 1.As of Unicode version 18.0 2.Grey areas indicate non-assigned code points

== History ==
The following Unicode-related documents record the purpose and process of defining specific characters in the Hebrew block:

Version	Final code points (Note: Proposed code points and characters names may differ from final code points and names)	Count	UTC ID	L2 ID	WG2 ID	Document
1.0.0	U+05B0..05B9, 05BB..05C3, 05D0..05EA, 05F0..05F4	51	UTC/1991-053			Rosenne, Jony (1991-03-26), Hebrew
1.0.0	U+05B0..05B9, 05BB..05C3, 05D0..05EA, 05F0..05F4	51	UTC/1991-048B			Whistler, Ken (1991-03-27), "5) Hebrew", Draft Minutes from the UTC meeting #46 day 2, 3/27 at Apple
1.0.0	U+05B0..05B9, 05BB..05C3, 05D0..05EA, 05F0..05F4	51			N1026	Liaison Report - Encoding Newsletter, April 1994
1.0.0	U+05B0..05B9, 05BB..05C3, 05D0..05EA, 05F0..05F4	51		X3L2/94-098	N1033 (pdf, doc)	Umamaheswaran, V. S.; Ksar, Mike (1994-06-01), "8.1.14", Unconfirmed Minutes of ISO/IEC JTC 1/SC 2/WG 2 Meeting 25, Falez Hotel, Antalya, Turkey, 1994-04-18--22
1.0.0	U+05B0..05B9, 05BB..05C3, 05D0..05EA, 05F0..05F4	51		L2/03-234		Hudson, John (2003-08-05), More on Meteg and CGJ [1]
1.0.0	U+05B0..05B9, 05BB..05C3, 05D0..05EA, 05F0..05F4	51		L2/03-235		Whistler, Ken (2003-08-05), More on Meteg and CGJ [2]
1.0.0	U+05B0..05B9, 05BB..05C3, 05D0..05EA, 05F0..05F4	51		L2/03-236		Whistler, Ken (2003-08-05), More on Meteg and CGJ [3]
1.0.0	U+05B0..05B9, 05BB..05C3, 05D0..05EA, 05F0..05F4	51		L2/03-261		Keown, Elaine (2003-08-05), E-mail to ANSI regarding Hebrew encoding
1.0.0	U+05B0..05B9, 05BB..05C3, 05D0..05EA, 05F0..05F4	51		L2/03-297		Rosenne, Jony (2003-08-24), Hebrew Issues
1.0.0	U+05B0..05B9, 05BB..05C3, 05D0..05EA, 05F0..05F4	51		L2/04-194		Kirk, Peter (2004-06-05), On the Hebrew mark METEG
1.0.0	U+05B0..05B9, 05BB..05C3, 05D0..05EA, 05F0..05F4	51		L2/04-213		Rosenne, Jony (2004-06-07), Responses to Several Hebrew Related Items
1.0.0	U+05B0..05B9, 05BB..05C3, 05D0..05EA, 05F0..05F4	51		L2/06-104		Konstantinov, Ilya (2006-01-18), Feedback for Unicode 5.0.0: HEBREW PUNCTUATION MAQAF is a Dash-character
1.0.0	U+05B0..05B9, 05BB..05C3, 05D0..05EA, 05F0..05F4	51		L2/06-108		Moore, Lisa (2006-05-25), "B.14.5, B.11.8", UTC #107 Minutes
2.0	U+0591..05A1, 05A3..05AF, 05C4	31			N1079R	Hebrew cantillation marks in ISO/IEC 10646-1
2.0	U+0591..05A1, 05A3..05AF, 05C4	31			N1117	Umamaheswaran, V. S.; Ksar, Mike (1994-10-31), "7.2.2 item f", Unconfirmed Minutes of ISO/IEC JTC 1/SC 2/WG 2 Meeting 26, Tuscan Inn - Fisherman's Wharf, San Francisco, CA, UAS; 1994-10-10 through 14
2.0	U+0591..05A1, 05A3..05AF, 05C4	31			N1079RA	Summary Proposal Form and Examples
2.0	U+0591..05A1, 05A3..05AF, 05C4	31			N1079R2	Hebrew cantillation marks in ISO/IEC 10646-1
2.0	U+0591..05A1, 05A3..05AF, 05C4	31			N1195	Hebrew Cantillation marks
2.0	U+0591..05A1, 05A3..05AF, 05C4	31			N1203	Umamaheswaran, V. S.; Ksar, Mike (1995-05-03), "6.1.8", Unconfirmed minutes of SC2/WG2 Meeting 27, Geneva
2.0	U+0591..05A1, 05A3..05AF, 05C4	31			N1217	Further clarifications regarding WG2 N1195, 1995-05-21
2.0	U+0591..05A1, 05A3..05AF, 05C4	31		X3L2/95-090	N1253 (doc, txt)	Umamaheswaran, V. S.; Ksar, Mike (1995-09-09), "6.4.3", Unconfirmed Minutes of WG 2 Meeting # 28 in Helsinki, Finland; 1995-06-26--27
2.0	U+0591..05A1, 05A3..05AF, 05C4	31			N1315	Updated Table of replies and national body feedback on pDAM7 - Additional characters (SC2 N2656), 1996-01-09
2.0	U+0591..05A1, 05A3..05AF, 05C4	31			N1539	Table of Replies and Feedback on Amendment 7 – Hebrew etc., 1997-01-29
2.0	U+0591..05A1, 05A3..05AF, 05C4	31		L2/97-127	N1563	Paterson, Bruce (1997-05-27), Draft Report on JTC1 letter ballot on DAM No. 7 to ISO/IEC 10646-1 (33 additional characters)
2.0	U+0591..05A1, 05A3..05AF, 05C4	31			N1572	Paterson, Bruce (1997-06-23), Almost Final Text – DAM 7 – 33 additional characters
2.0	U+0591..05A1, 05A3..05AF, 05C4	31		L2/97-288	N1603	Umamaheswaran, V. S. (1997-10-24), "5.3.3", Unconfirmed Meeting Minutes, WG 2 Meeting # 33, Heraklion, Crete, Greece, 20 June – 4 July 1997
4.1	U+05A2	1		L2/03-443	N2692	Shoulson, Mark; Kirk, Peter; Everson, Michael (2003-12-11), Proposal to add ATNAH HAFUKH to the BMP of the UCS
4.1	U+05A2	1		L2/04-156R2		Moore, Lisa (2004-08-13), "Atnah Hafukh (A.17.3)", UTC #99 Minutes
4.1	U+05C5..05C6	2		L2/03-297		Rosenne, Jony (2003-08-24), Hebrew Issues
4.1	U+05C5..05C6	2		L2/03-299		Kirk, Peter (2003-08-25), Issues in the Representation of Pointed Hebrew in Unicode
4.1	U+05C5..05C6	2		L2/04-089R	N2714	Shoulson, Mark; Kirk, Peter; Hudson, John; Everson, Michael; Constable, Peter (2004-03-04), Proposal to add two Masoretic punctuation marks to the BMP of the UCS
4.1	U+05C5..05C6	2		L2/04-156R2		Moore, Lisa (2004-08-13), "Two Hebrew punctuation marks (A.17.4)", UTC #99 Minutes
4.1	U+05C7	1		L2/03-297		Rosenne, Jony (2003-08-24), Hebrew Issues
4.1	U+05C7	1		L2/04-150	N2755	Everson, Michael; Shoulson, Mark (2004-05-03), Proposal to add QAMATS QATAN to the BMP of the UCS
4.1	U+05C7	1		L2/04-213		Rosenne, Jony (2004-06-07), Responses to Several Hebrew Related Items
4.1	U+05C7	1			N2821	Everson, Michael; Shoulson, Mark (2004-06-21), Clarification on the name QAMATS QATAN
4.1	U+05C7	1		L2/04-346		Kirk, Peter (2004-08-12), Proposal to change the provisional code point allocations for proposed characters HEBREW POINT HOLAM HASER FOR VAV and HEBREW POINT QAMATS QATAN
4.1	U+05C7	1		L2/04-156R2		Moore, Lisa (2004-08-13), "QAMATS QATAN (A.17.5)", UTC #99 Minutes
4.1	U+05C7	1		L2/18-274		McGowan, Rick (2018-09-14), "Identifier_Type of U+05C7 HEBREW POINT QAMATS QATAN", Comments on Public Review Issues (July 24 - Sept 14, 2018)
4.1	U+05C7	1		L2/18-272		Moore, Lisa (2018-10-29), "157-C17 Consensus", UTC #157 Minutes, "Change the Identifier_Type of U+05C7 HEBREW POINT QAMATS QATAN from "Obsolete" to "Uncommon_Use Technical" for Unicode version 12.0."
5.0	U+05BA	1		L2/03-297		Rosenne, Jony (2003-08-24), Hebrew Issues
5.0	U+05BA	1		L2/04-193		Kirk, Peter (2004-06-05), On the Hebrew vowel HOLAM
5.0	U+05BA	1		L2/04-213		Rosenne, Jony (2004-06-07), Responses to Several Hebrew Related Items
5.0	U+05BA	1		L2/04-306		Kirk, Peter (2004-07-29), Background material for the proposal on the Hebrew vowel HOLAM
5.0	U+05BA	1		L2/04-307		Kirk, Peter; Shmidman, Avi; Cowan, John; Hopp, Ted; Peterson, Trevor; Lowery, Kirk; Keown, Elaine; Robertson, Stuart (2004-07-29), New proposal on the Hebrew vowel HOLAM
5.0	U+05BA	1		L2/04-310	N2840	Everson, Michael; Shoulson, Mark (2004-07-29), Proposal to add HEBREW POINT HOLAM HASER FOR VAV to the BMP of the UCS
5.0	U+05BA	1		L2/04-313		Kirk, Peter (2004-08-02), Response to "Proposal to add HEBREW POINT HOLAM HASER FOR VAV"
5.0	U+05BA	1		L2/04-326		Rosenne, Jony (2004-08-02), UTC - Holam proposals
5.0	U+05BA	1		L2/04-327		Hudson, John (2004-08-03), Distinction of Vav Haluma and Holam Male
5.0	U+05BA	1		L2/04-346		Kirk, Peter (2004-08-12), Proposal to change the provisional code point allocations for proposed characters HEBREW POINT HOLAM HASER FOR VAV and HEBREW POINT QAMATS QATAN
5.0	U+05BA	1		L2/04-344		Everson, Michael; Shoulson, Mark (2004-08-18), Disunification costs regarding HOLAM and VAV in Hebrew
11.0	U+05EF	1			N1740 (html, doc)	Shoulson, Mark; Everson, Michael (1998-05-09), Proposal to add the Hebrew Tetragrammaton to ISO/IEC 10646
11.0	U+05EF	1			N1807 (pdf, doc, txt)	Rosenne, Jonathan (1998-07-07), Israeli Response to the Tetragrammaton Proposal N1740
11.0	U+05EF	1		L2/15-092		Shoulson, Mark (2015-03-10), Typographic Concerns and the Hebrew Nomina Sacra
11.0	U+05EF	1		L2/15-149		Anderson, Deborah; Whistler, Ken; McGowan, Rick; Pournader, Roozbeh; Pandey, Anshuman; Glass, Andrew (2015-05-03), "24 Hebrew Nomina Sacra", Recommendations to UTC #143 May 2015 on Script Proposals
11.0	U+05EF	1		L2/15-204		Anderson, Deborah; et al. (2015-07-25), "14. Hebrew Nomina Sacra", Recommendations to UTC #144 July 2015 on Script Proposals
11.0	U+05EF	1		L2/16-305	N4807	Shoulson, Mark (2016-10-28), Proposal to add HEBREW YOD TRIANGLE
11.0	U+05EF	1		L2/17-037		Anderson, Deborah; Whistler, Ken; Pournader, Roozbeh; Glass, Andrew; Iancu, Laurențiu; Moore, Lisa; Liang, Hai; Ishida, Richard; Misra, Karan; McGowan, Rick (2017-01-21), "16. Hebrew", Recommendations to UTC #150 January 2017 on Script Proposals
11.0	U+05EF	1		L2/17-016		Moore, Lisa (2017-02-08), "C.12", UTC #150 Minutes
18.0	U+05C8	1		L2/24-274		Mosesson, Jonathan (2024-12-05), Proposal to encode Hebrew Point Sheva Na
18.0	U+05C8	1		L2/25-010		Kučera, Jan; et al. (2025-01-16), "1.2 Hebrew Point Sheva Na", Recommendations to UTC #182 (January 2025) on Script Proposals
18.0	U+05C8	1		L2/25-003		Leroy, Robin (2025-01-28), "Consensus 182-C4", UTC #182 Minutes, "Provisionally assign one code point U+05C8 HEBREW POINT HEAVY SHEVA ..."
18.0	U+05C8	1		L2/25-160		Denckla, Ben (2025-05-05), UTC Doc: Regarding the name "Heavy Sheva"
18.0	U+05C8	1		L2/25-187		Kučera, Jan; Anderson, Deborah; Pournader, Roozbeh; Constable, Peter; Goregaokar, Manish; Leroy, Robin (2025-07-18), "5.17 Heavy Sheva name", Recommendations to UTC #184 (July 2025) on Script Proposals
18.0	U+05C8	1		L2/25-232R		Kučera, Jan; Pournader, Roozbeh; Anderson, Deborah; Leroy, Robin; Goregaokar, Manish (2025-10-27), "4.1 Heavy Sheva name", Recommendations to UTC #185 (October 2025) on Script Proposals
18.0	U+05C8	1		L2/25-226		"Consensus 185-C33", UTC #185 Minutes, 2025-10-29, "Change the name of U+05C8 HEBREW POINT HEAVY SHEVA ... to HEBREW POINT SHEVA NA MUDGASH ..."
18.0	U+05C9	1		L2/25-175		Denckla, Ben (2025-05-28), Adding dagesh ḥazaq to Hebrew
18.0	U+05C9	1		L2/25-187		Kučera, Jan; Anderson, Deborah; Pournader, Roozbeh; Constable, Peter; Goregaokar, Manish; Leroy, Robin (2025-07-18), "1.4 Dagesh ḥazaq", Recommendations to UTC #184 (July 2025) on Script Proposals
18.0	U+05C9	1		L2/25-181		Leroy, Robin (2025-08-07), "Consensus 184-C9:Provisionally assign one code point U+05C9 HEBREW POINT HEAVY DAGESH ...", UTC #184 Minutes
18.0	U+05C9	1		L2/25-232R		Kučera, Jan; Pournader, Roozbeh; Anderson, Deborah; Leroy, Robin; Goregaokar, Manish (2025-10-27), "4.1 Heavy Sheva name", Recommendations to UTC #185 (October 2025) on Script Proposals
18.0	U+05C9	1		L2/25-226		"Consensus 185-C33", UTC #185 Minutes, 2025-10-29, "Change the name of ... U+05C9 HEBREW POINT HEAVY DAGESH ... to ... HEBREW POINT DAGESH HAZAQ MUDGASH ..."
18.0	U+05C9	1		L2/26-003		"Consensus 186-C18", UTC #186 Minutes, 2026-02-01, "UTC accepts for encoding ..."

== See also ==
- Hebrew alphabet in Unicode
- Alphabetic Presentation Forms (Unicode block)
