= Revia (Hebrew cantillation mark) =

Hebrew cantillation mark

Revia
רְבִ֗יעַ / ֗ / וְהָאָ֗רֶץ
cantillation
Sof passuk	׃	Paseq	׀
Etnakhta/atnakh	֑	Segol	֒
Shalshelet	֓	Zakef katan	֔
Zakef gadol	֕	Tifcha/tarkha	֖
Rivia	֗	Zarka	֘
Pashta	֙	Yetiv	֚
Tevir	֛	Geresh	֜
Geresh muqdam	֝	Gershayim	֞
Karne parah	֟	Telisha gedola/talsha	֠
Pazer	֡	Atnah hafukh	֢
Munakh/shofar holekh	֣	Mahpach	֤
Merkha/ma’arikh	֥	Mercha kefula	֦
Darga	֧	Qadma	֨
Telisha qetana/tarsa	֩	Yerah ben yomo	֪
Ole	֫	Illuy	֬
Dehi	֭	Tsinnorit	֮

Revia (Hebrew: רְבִיעַ, [r^{ə}viaʕ]) is a cantillation mark commonly found in the Torah, Haftarah, and other biblical texts.

It is commonly explained as being the Aramaic equivalent of Hebrew רְבִיעִי Revi'i, meaning 'fourth' or 'quarter'., and for that reason is sometimes called Revi'i. However, this is probably a folk etymology: the more likely meaning in Aramaic is "crouching" or "lying", referring to its position vertically above the word.

Revia is considered to have medium strength. It is stronger than a Pashta or Tevir, but weaker than a Zakef or Tifcha. The Revia replaces the Pashta when a stronger stop is needed, especially when there are too many pashta in a row. However, the last stop before the Zakef always remain a Pashta.

Revia's disjunctives are Munach Legarmeh and Geresh (replaced by Gershayim when it is not preceded by a Kadma and oxytonic).

Its conjunctives are Munach and Darga. The closest conjunctive is always a Munach, the second one, a Darga, the third one a Munach etc.

Based on its translation as fourth, in printed texts it is represented by a diamond-shaped mark. However in manuscripts it is just a dot.

== Total occurrences ==
Book	Number of appearances
Torah	2430
Genesis	610
Exodus	504
Leviticus	312
Numbers	497
Deuteronomy	507
Nevi'im	2239
Ketuvim	1672

== Melody ==
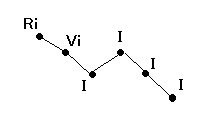
The Rivia is read in a slow, downward tone, with a pause in the middle breaking upward.
