= Sof passuk =

Hebrew cantillation mark

Sof passuk
סוֹף פָּסוּק / ׃ / הָאָֽרֶץ׃
cantillation
Sof passuk	׃	Paseq	׀
Etnakhta/atnakh	֑	Segol	֒
Shalshelet	֓	Zakef katan	֔
Zakef gadol	֕	Tifcha/tarkha	֖
Rivia	֗	Zarka	֘
Pashta	֙	Yetiv	֚
Tevir	֛	Geresh	֜
Geresh muqdam	֝	Gershayim	֞
Karne parah	֟	Telisha gedola/talsha	֠
Pazer	֡	Atnah hafukh	֢
Munakh/shofar holekh	֣	Mahpach	֤
Merkha/ma’arikh	֥	Mercha kefula	֦
Darga	֧	Qadma	֨
Telisha qetana/tarsa	֩	Yerah ben yomo	֪
Ole	֫	Illuy	֬
Dehi	֭	Tsinnorit	֮

The sof passuk (Hebrew: סוֹף פָּסוּק, romanized: sof pāsuq, lit. 'end of verse') is the mark of Hebrew cantillation that occurs on the last word of every verse, or passuk, in the Hebrew Bible. Some short verses contain only members of the sof passuk group. A sof passuk is preceded by the סילוק (silluq) (see meteg) in the last word of the verse.

The conjunctive (mesharet) which precedes the sof pasuq is always a mercha. The last disjunctive (mafsiq) before it is always a tipcha, or eventually a etnachta.

In some rare cases, and only when the last disjunctive was an etnachta, the secondary stress of the sof passuk is replaced by a tipcha instead of the usual meteg, as in לְדֹרֹ֖תֵיכֶֽם (Numbers 15:21). This combination is called me'ayelá (מְאַיְלָא Biblical Hebrew pronunciation: [məʾēyəlā]).

== Total occurrences ==
Book	Number of appearances
Torah	5,852
Genesis	1,533
Exodus	1,213
Leviticus	859
Numbers	1,288
Deuteronomy	959
Nevi'im	4,975
Ketuvim	3,599

== Melody ==
Different melodies are assigned to the trope for each section of the Hebrew Bible: The Torah, the Haftarah, and the Megillot. Different Jewish communities also use different Torah tropes. The following should not be considered an exhaustive list of all possible cantillations.

=== Basic ===
Appears at the end of a verse.

=== Sof parasha/sof hachelek ===
Appears at the end of a parashah.

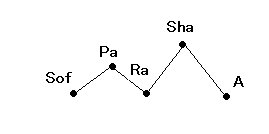

== In the Ten Commandments ==
There is controversy over the use of the sof passuk during the reading of the Ten Commandments. There are two versions of the trope sounds for the Ten Commandments, one that divides them into 13 verses, based on the number of sof passuk notes, and the other that divides them into ten verses, the actual number of commandments. It is for this reason that not all commandments actually have a sof passuk at the end of their own names.

== Other versions ==
=== Sof parasha ===
The end of a single reading (aliya) which is chanted in a different melody, thereby giving the sound of finality to the reading. The tune for the end of the aliya can be applied to different verses based on different reading schedules, including the full parasha (on Shabbat during Shacharit in most synagogues), a partial reading (as is read on weekdays, Shabbat Mincha, and the selected readings of various holidays), or the Triennial cycle.

=== Sof sefer ===
At the conclusion to any sefer of the Torah, a special tune is used for the words "hazak hazak venithazek" after the reader finishes the book. These words are recited first by the congregation and then repeated by the reader.

== Unicode ==
Glyph	Unicode	Name	׃	׃	U+05C3	HEBREW PUNCTUATION SOF PASUQ
