= Pashta =

Pashta
פַּשְׁטָא֙ / ֙ / אָדָם֙
cantillation
Sof passuk	׃	Paseq	׀
Etnakhta/atnakh	֑	Segol	֒
Shalshelet	֓	Zakef katan	֔
Zakef gadol	֕	Tifcha/tarkha	֖
Rivia	֗	Zarka	֘
Pashta	֙	Yetiv	֚
Tevir	֛	Geresh	֜
Geresh muqdam	֝	Gershayim	֞
Karne parah	֟	Telisha gedola/talsha	֠
Pazer	֡	Atnah hafukh	֢
Munakh/shofar holekh	֣	Mahpach	֤
Merkha/ma’arikh	֥	Mercha kefula	֦
Darga	֧	Qadma	֨
Telisha qetana/tarsa	֩	Yerah ben yomo	֪
Ole	֫	Illuy	֬
Dehi	֭	Tsinnorit	֮

Pashta (Hebrew: פַּשְׁטָא) is a common cantillation mark found in the Torah, Haftarah, and other books of the Hebrew Bible. It is part of the Katan group. Its mark symbol is identical to that of the Kadma.

While Kadma and Pashta use the same symbol, Pashta is distinct from Kadma in the placement of the symbol. Kadma is always placed on the accented syllable, while Pashta is placed on the last letter as well as on the accented syllable, if it's not the last.

The Pashta is a third-level disjunctive (sar) which precedes the Zakef Katan. It is replaced by a Revia when stronger stop is needed, or when there are more than three in a row. However, the last stop before the zakef can never turn into Revia. When a Segol needs more than one sar, the first one is often a pashta and the second one, a Zarka, even though it is possible to have two zarka in a row.

The conjunctives of the Pashta are: Mapach, Mercha, Kadma, Munach and Telisha ketanna. The closest conjunctive is generally a Mapach, but it turns into Mercha, when there is no syllables between the conjunctive's stress and the pashta's stress, as in הָיְתָ֥ה תֹ֙הוּ֙. The previous conjunctive, when it exists, is generally a Kadma, but turns into a Munach if it is prototonic. The third one is a Telisha ketanna, whereas the fourth one is a classic Munach.

The fourth-level disjunctives (pekidim) which precedes the Pashta are (Ve)azla, Geresh, Gershayim, Telisha gedola and Pazer. The closest disjunctive is either (Ve)azla, Geresh, or Gershayim according to the following:

- Geresh if the word is paroxytonic
- (Ve)azla if it is preceded by a Kadma (typically a non-protonic word)
- Gershayim otherwise.

The second one dijunctive is a Telisha Gedola, and all the others are Pazer.

The Hebrew word פַּשְׁטָא translates into English as stretching out.

== Numbers of occurrences ==
Book	Number of appearances
Torah	5429
Genesis	1428
Exodus	1134
Leviticus	777
Numbers	1055
Deuteronomy	1039
Nevi'im	5935
Ketuvim	3916

== Melody ==
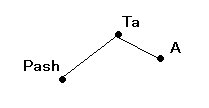
