= Mercha =

Mercha
מֵרְכָ֥א / ֥ / וַיִּרְבּ֥וּ
cantillation
Sof passuk	׃	Paseq	׀
Etnakhta/atnakh	֑	Segol	֒
Shalshelet	֓	Zakef katan	֔
Zakef gadol	֕	Tifcha/tarkha	֖
Rivia	֗	Zarka	֘
Pashta	֙	Yetiv	֚
Tevir	֛	Geresh	֜
Geresh muqdam	֝	Gershayim	֞
Karne parah	֟	Telisha gedola/talsha	֠
Pazer	֡	Atnah hafukh	֢
Munakh/shofar holekh	֣	Mahpach	֤
Merkha/ma’arikh	֥	Mercha kefula	֦
Darga	֧	Qadma	֨
Telisha qetana/tarsa	֩	Yerah ben yomo	֪
Ole	֫	Illuy	֬
Dehi	֭	Tsinnorit	֮

Mercha (Hebrew: מֵרְכָא, also called מַאֲרִיךְ Maarich or מַאַרְכָא Maarcha) is a cantillation mark commonly found in the Torah, Haftarah, and other books that are chanted.

Mercha is a conjunctive (mesharet) which precedes the following disjunctives (mafsikim):

- Tifcha
- Sof passuk
- Munach Legarmeh
- Pashta: Only when the mercha and the pashta are followed, without any syllable between them, as in הָיְתָ֥ה תֹ֙הוּ֙
- Zarka: Same rule as the Pashta
- Tevir: Only if there is one syllable or less between the mercha and the tevir, as in מַעְיָ֥ן וּב֛וֹר.

In some codex, when the tevir is not preceded by a darga or a mercha, and has a meteg because of a hateph-vowel, the meteg is then replaced by a mercha, as in וְנָ֥תְנ֛ו

Mercha appears in the Torah 9117 times—the second most of any trope sounds. Only Tipcha occurs more often.

The Aramaic word מֵרְכָא translates into English as elongation.

== Total occurrences ==
Book	Number of appearances
Torah	9117
Genesis	2415
Exodus	1879
Leviticus	1371
Numbers	1859
Deuteronomy	1595
Nevi'im	7672
Ketuvim	5235

== Melody ==
=== In Etnachta group ===
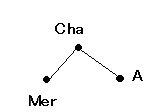

=== In Sof Passuk group ===
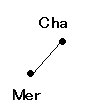
First appearance (before Tipcha)
Second appearance (after Tipcha)
