= Zakef =

Zakef may refer to:

- Zakef katon, a trope sound from the Katon group
- Zakef gadol, a common independent trope
