= Etnachta =

Hebrew cantilation

etnahta
אֶתְנַחְתָּ֑א / ֑ / ט֑וֹב
cantillation
Sof passuk	׃	Paseq	׀
Etnakhta/atnakh	֑	Segol	֒
Shalshelet	֓	Zakef katan	֔
Zakef gadol	֕	Tifcha/tarkha	֖
Rivia	֗	Zarka	֘
Pashta	֙	Yetiv	֚
Tevir	֛	Geresh	֜
Geresh muqdam	֝	Gershayim	֞
Karne parah	֟	Telisha gedola/talsha	֠
Pazer	֡	Atnah hafukh	֢
Munakh/shofar holekh	֣	Mahpach	֤
Merkha/ma’arikh	֥	Mercha kefula	֦
Darga	֧	Qadma	֨
Telisha qetana/tarsa	֩	Yerah ben yomo	֪
Ole	֫	Illuy	֬
Dehi	֭	Tsinnorit	֮

Etnachta (Hebrew: אֶתְנַחְתָּא, also called אַתְנָח or אַתְנָחָא) is one of the most common cantillation marks in the Torah and Haftarah. It is the anchor for the Etnachta group, which in full consists of four different trope sounds, not all of which are always present. These are Mercha, Tipcha, Munach, and its namesake Etnachta.

The Etnachta group marks the end of the first segment of a verse. If the verse includes three segments, the end of the first segment is marked by a Segol, and it is only the second segment which ends with the Etnachta. Therefore, the Etnachta never occurs more than once in a single verse.

The conjunctive (mesharet) which precedes the Etnachta is always a Munach. There can be either one or two Munach before the Etnachta.

The second-level disjunctive (melech) which precedes the Etnachta is the Tipcha.

In some rare cases, when the melech is especially strong, and the word with the Etnachta includes a secondary stress, the melech will then remain a Zakef Katan, and the secondary stress will turn into Tipcha (instead of the usual Meteg). This combination is called מְאַיְלָא meaila.

An example is in the first verse of the Book of Genesis according to the Masoretic Text, the statement that God created is marked with an Etnachta, showing the completion of God’s creation.

The Etnachta is a first-level disjunctive (kesar)

The Hebrew word אֶתְנַחְתָּא translates into English as pause. This name is given because of its central location within a verse.

== The Etnachta group ==
The following variations of the Etnachta group can occur:

1. Mercha, Tipcha, Munach, Etnachta
2. Mercha, Tipcha, Etnachta
3. Tipcha, Munach, Etnachta
4. Tipcha, Etnachta
5. Munach, Etnachta
6. Etnachta

In other words, the Tipcha can occur without a Mercha, but not vice versa. The Etnachta can occur without Munach, but not vice versa. And the Etnachta can occur without a Tipcha, but not vice versa.

The Munach is normally included when the word bearing the Munach is closely related to the word bearing the Etnachta.

== Total occurrences ==
Book	Number of appearances
Torah	5483
Genesis	1466
Exodus	1145
Leviticus	813
Numbers	1151
Deuteronomy	908
Nevi'im	4796
Ketuvim	2933

== Melody ==
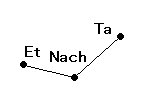
