= Moroccan cantillation =

Style of reading the Torah

Moroccan cantillation (also referred to as Moroccan Te'amim, (Hebrew: טעמי המקרא מרוקאים or טעמי המקרא נוסח מרוקו) refers primarily to the style and tune used by Jews of Moroccan descent when reading the Torah. It may also refer to the tune used when reading the other books of the Tanach, and to a lesser degree, the Mishna. The Moroccan rite is distinct from other Sephardic, Yemenite and Ashkenazic cantillations and is considered to be a category unto itself.

== Torah ==
The names of the cantillation notes (Te'amim) used by Moroccan Jews are similar to those used by other Sephardic communities, although their tunes are different. Moroccan Te'amim generally fit into the Makam scales of Zidane and Hijaz Al Kabir It would be more accurate to say that the makam / Andalusi nuba of the Moroccan Torah reading is Khazar (Khassar), and is a branch of the Hijaz Al Kabir family.

While Yerushalmi Te'amim are considered to be classified as makam sigah, it would be more accurate to say that the makam of the reading in the Jerusalem Torah is the makam Khozam (which consists of sigah on the tone mi, and hijaz on the tone sol).

=== Ta'am Elyon ===
In mainstream parlance, Ta'am Elyon refers to the alternate cantillation used to read the Ten Commandments. However, in the Moroccan community, it is also used to refer to the special cantillation used in certain sections of the Torah portions of Beshalach and Yitro. Specifically, Ta'am Elyon refers to the alternate tune in the Tarḥa and Sof Pasuk cantillations at the end of certain verses in those Torah portions.

== Tanach ==
=== Haftara ===
Moroccan Jews also have a distinct cantillation when reading the Haftara. The Moroccan cantillation for the Haftara can be further subdivided into the tune used by the general Moroccan community and that of the Spanish Moroccan community. Generally, this difference can be observed on ordinary Shabbatot, but on holidays, the Spanish Moroccans use the same tune as the general Moroccan community. Furthermore, there is a custom among some Moroccans to use the Spanish Moroccan tune for the Haftara that is read on Tisha B'Av. There exists a difference between the Darga and Tevir cantillations depending on if they are in the middle of a verse or closer to the end of a verse. If there are two sets of Darga and Tevir, they are always read in the two different tunes.

==== Tlata DePuranuta ====
On the Shabbatot that fall during the Three Weeks, special Haftarot are read whose themes deal with the Jewish exile and other calamities. In the Moroccan rite there is a special, solemn tune used to read these Haftarot, in line with the mournful period of the year. There are some opinions which maintain that such a tune is inappropriate since any public forms of mourning are forbidden on Shabbat, even during the Three Weeks.

=== Psalms ===
The cantillation used for Tehillim can also be subdivided into the Moroccan and the Spanish Moroccan rites. The tune used by Spanish Moroccans is that which is used to read Psalms at funerals by other Moroccans.

=== Shir Hashririm ===
As with other Sephardic communities, Shir Hashirim is chanted during Kabbalat Shabbat as well as at the end of the Seder. This too has its own unique cantillation in the Moroccan community. Megillat Ruth, which is traditionally read on Shavuot, has a tune which is very similar to that of Shir Hashirim, with some minor differences. The book of Job also has a similar tune.

== See also ==
- Hebrew cantillation
- Minhag Morocco
- Moroccan Jews

== Bibliography ==
- Darké Abotenou: The Laws and Customs of the Jews of Morocco, ISBN 9781937887636
- Tikkun Korim Ish Matzliah, Machon Harav Matzliah
- Siddour, Patah Eliyahou, Editions Charbit
