= Ole (cantillation) =

Ole
עוֹלֶה / ֫ / בְּאַ֫פּ֥וֹ
cantillation
Sof passuk	׃	Paseq	׀
Etnakhta/atnakh	֑	Segol	֒
Shalshelet	֓	Zakef katan	֔
Zakef gadol	֕	Tifcha/tarkha	֖
Rivia	֗	Zarka	֘
Pashta	֙	Yetiv	֚
Tevir	֛	Geresh	֜
Geresh muqdam	֝	Gershayim	֞
Karne parah	֟	Telisha gedola/talsha	֠
Pazer	֡	Atnah hafukh	֢
Munakh/shofar holekh	֣	Mahpach	֤
Merkha/ma’arikh	֥	Mercha kefula	֦
Darga	֧	Qadma	֨
Telisha qetana/tarsa	֩	Yerah ben yomo	֪
Ole	֫	Illuy	֬
Dehi	֭	Tsinnorit	֮

Ole (Hebrew: עוֹלֶה) a cantillation mark found in Psalms, Proverbs, and Job (the אמ״ת books). Ole is also sometimes used as a stress marker in texts without cantillation.

== Total occurrences ==
Book	Number of appearances
Psalms	325
Book of Job	40
Book of Proverbs	29
