= Darga =

Hebrew cantillation mark

Darga
דַּרְגָּ֧א / ֧ / תֽוֹלְד֧וֹת
cantillation
Sof passuk	׃	Paseq	׀
Etnakhta/atnakh	֑	Segol	֒
Shalshelet	֓	Zakef katan	֔
Zakef gadol	֕	Tifcha/tarkha	֖
Rivia	֗	Zarka	֘
Pashta	֙	Yetiv	֚
Tevir	֛	Geresh	֜
Geresh muqdam	֝	Gershayim	֞
Karne parah	֟	Telisha gedola/talsha	֠
Pazer	֡	Atnah hafukh	֢
Munakh/shofar holekh	֣	Mahpach	֤
Merkha/ma’arikh	֥	Mercha kefula	֦
Darga	֧	Qadma	֨
Telisha qetana/tarsa	֩	Yerah ben yomo	֪
Ole	֫	Illuy	֬
Dehi	֭	Tsinnorit	֮

Darga (Hebrew: דַּרְגָּא) is a cantillation mark commonly found in the Torah, Haftarah, and other books. The symbol for the darga resembles a backwards Z.

The darga is a conjunctive (mesharet) which precedes disjunctives (mafsikim) Tevir, Mercha kefula and Revia, but the cases in which it appears differ dependig on the disjunctive:

- Before a Tevir, the conjunctive is a darga only when there is at least four syllables between the conjunctive and the disjunctive (both included) as in וַיַּ֧רְא אֱלֹהִ֛ים (Genesis 1:4). Otherwise it is a Mercha
- When there is two conjunctives before a Revia, the first one is a darga (the second one is a Munach as usual)
- The conjunctive which precedes a mercha kefulah is always a darga

The Aramaic word דַּרְגָּא translates into English as step.

== Total occurrences ==
Book	Number of appearances
Torah	1091
Genesis	253
Exodus	221
Leviticus	171
Numbers	237
Deuteronomy	209
Nevi'im	710
Ketuvim	637

== Melody ==
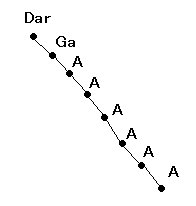
The Ashkenazic darga is recited in a fast, downward slope, as follows:

The Sefardic darga is ascending, and the Moroccan darga is descending with a waver in the middle.
