= Mahpach =

Mahpach
מַהְפַּ֤ךְ / ֤ / ק֚וֹל
cantillation
Sof passuk	׃	Paseq	׀
Etnakhta/atnakh	֑	Segol	֒
Shalshelet	֓	Zakef katan	֔
Zakef gadol	֕	Tifcha/tarkha	֖
Rivia	֗	Zarka	֘
Pashta	֙	Yetiv	֚
Tevir	֛	Geresh	֜
Geresh muqdam	֝	Gershayim	֞
Karne parah	֟	Telisha gedola/talsha	֠
Pazer	֡	Atnah hafukh	֢
Munakh/shofar holekh	֣	Mahpach	֤
Merkha/ma’arikh	֥	Mercha kefula	֦
Darga	֧	Qadma	֨
Telisha qetana/tarsa	֩	Yerah ben yomo	֪
Ole	֫	Illuy	֬
Dehi	֭	Tsinnorit	֮

Mahpach (Hebrew: מַהְפַּךְ, with variant English spellings) is a common cantillation mark found in the Torah, Haftarah, and other books of the Hebrew Bible. It is part of the Katan group, and it frequently begins the group. The symbol for the Mahpach is <.

Mahpach is always followed by a pashta. This is because Mahpach is a conjunctive, showing a connection with the word that follows. When the Mahpach is found, the < is placed under the syllable that is most heavily stressed. The variant Yetiv trope uses the same < symbol as the Mahpach, but does not have a Pashta that follows.

Mahpach is found in the Torah 3042 times.

The Hebrew word מַהְפַּךְ translates into English to reversal. The original symbol looked more like a sideways U than a V (to represent going forward then turning back around), but this was changed because it was easier for printers to print, as modern keyboards have the < symbols.

== Number of occurrences ==
Book	Number of appearances
Torah	3042
Genesis	798
Exodus	655
Leviticus	452
Numbers	568
Deuteronomy	569
Nevi'im	3449
Ketuvim	2096

== Melody ==
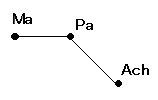
The Mahpach is sung on a high note until the final syllable, which is lower.
