= Hebrew cantillation =

Jewish religious chanting practice

cantillation
Sof passuk	׃	Paseq	׀
Etnakhta/atnakh	֑	Segol	֒
Shalshelet	֓	Zakef katan	֔
Zakef gadol	֕	Tifcha/tarkha	֖
Rivia	֗	Zarka	֘
Pashta	֙	Yetiv	֚
Tevir	֛	Geresh	֜
Geresh muqdam	֝	Gershayim	֞
Karne parah	֟	Telisha gedola/talsha	֠
Pazer	֡	Atnah hafukh	֢
Munakh/shofar holekh	֣	Mahpach	֤
Merkha/ma’arikh	֥	Mercha kefula	֦
Darga	֧	Qadma	֨
Telisha qetana/tarsa	֩	Yerah ben yomo	֪
Ole	֫	Illuy	֬
Dehi	֭	Tsinnorit	֮

Genesis 1:9: And God said, "Let the waters be collected." Letters in black, niqqud (vowel pointing) and degeshim דְּגֵשִׁים (gemination marks) in red, cantillation in blue. Bare transliteration: wyʾmr ʾlhym yqww hmym. With accents: way-yōmér ĕlōhîm yiqqāwû ham-máyim.

Hebrew cantillation, trope, trop, or te'amim is the manner of chanting ritual readings from the Hebrew Bible in Jewish prayer. The chants are written and notated in accordance with the special signs or marks printed in the Masoretic Text of the Bible, to complement the letters and vowel points used in niqqud.

These marks are known in English as 'accents' (diacritics), 'notes' or trope symbols, and in Hebrew as taʿamé ha-mikrá 'cantillation marks of the scriptures' (טַעֲמֵי־הַמִּקְרָא) or just teʿamím 'cantillation marks' (טְעָמִים). Some of these signs were also sometimes used in medieval manuscripts of the Mishnah.

The musical motifs associated with the signs are known in Hebrew as niggun or neginot (not to be confused with the nigunim of Hasidic Judaism) and as Yiddish: טראָפּ, romanized: trop. The word trope is sometimes used in Jewish English varieties with the same meaning.

There are multiple traditions of cantillation. Within each tradition, there are multiple tropes, typically associated with different books of the Bible and often with different occasions. For example, different chants may be used for Torah readings on Rosh Hashana and Yom Kippur than for the same text on a normal Shabbat.

== History ==
Three systems of Hebrew punctuation (including vowels and cantillation symbols) have been used: the Babylonian, the Jerusalem, and the Tiberian, only the last of which is used today.

=== Babylonian system ===
Babylonian Biblical manuscripts from the Geonic period contain no cantillation marks in the current sense, but small Hebrew letters are used to mark significant divisions within a verse. Up to eight different letters are found, depending on the importance of the break and where it occurs in the verse: these correspond roughly to the disjunctives of the Tiberian system. For example, in some manuscripts the letter tav, for tevir (break), does duty for both Tiberian tevir and zaqef. In general there are no symbols for the conjunctives, though some late manuscripts use the Tiberian symbols for these. There is also no equivalent for low-grade disjunctives such as telisha gedolah: these are generally replaced by the equivalent of zaqef or revia.

Nothing is known of the musical realization of these marks, but it seems likely that they represent breaks or variations in a set melody applied to each verse. (A somewhat similar system is used in manuscripts of the Qur'an to guide the reader in fitting the chant to the verse: see Qur'an reading.)

This system is reflected in the cantillation practices of the Yemenite Jews, who now use the Tiberian symbols, but tend to have musical motifs only for the disjunctives and render the conjunctives in a monotone. It is notable that the Yemenite Jews have only eight disjunctive motifs, thus clearly reflecting the Babylonian notation. The same is true of the Karaite mode for the haftarah; while in the Sephardi haftarah modes different disjunctives often have the same or closely similar motifs, reducing the total number of effective motifs to something like the same number.

=== Jerusalem system ===
The Babylonian system, as mentioned above, is mainly concerned with showing breaks in the verse. Early manuscripts from Judaea and Galilee, by contrast, are mainly concerned with showing phrases: for example the tifcha-etnachta, zarqa-segolta and pashta-zaqef sequences, with or without intervening unaccented words. These sequences are generally linked by a series of dots, beginning or ending with a dash or a dot in a different place to show which sequence is meant. Unaccented words (which in the Tiberian system carry conjunctives) are generally shown by a dot following the word, as if to link it to the following word. There are separate symbols for more elaborate tropes like pazer and telisha gedolah.

The manuscripts are extremely fragmentary, no two of them following quite the same conventions, and these marks may represent the individual reader's aide-memoire rather than a formal system of punctuation (for example, vowel signs are often used only where the word would otherwise be ambiguous). In one manuscript, presumably of somewhat later date than the others, there are separate marks for different conjunctives, actually outnumbering those in the Tiberian system (for example, munach before etnachta has a different sign from munach before zaqef), and the overall system approaches the Tiberian in comprehensiveness. In some other manuscripts, in particular those containing Targumim rather than original text, the Tiberian symbols have been added by a later hand. In general, it may be observed that the Jerusalem and Tiberian systems are far more closely related to each other than either is to the Babylonian.

This system of phrasing is reflected in the Sephardic cantillation modes, in which the conjunctives (and to some extent the "near companions" such as tifcha, pashta and zarqa) are rendered as flourishes leading into the motif of the following disjunctive rather than as motifs in their own right.

The somewhat inconsistent use of dots above and below the words as disjunctives is closely similar to that found in Syriac texts. Kahle also notes some similarity with the punctuation of Samaritan Hebrew.

=== Tiberian system ===
By the tenth century CE, the chant in use in medieval Palestine had clearly become more complex, both because of the existence of pazer, geresh and telisha motifs in longer verses and because the realization of a phrase ending with a given type of break varied according to the number of words and syllables in the phrase. The Tiberian Masoretes therefore developed a comprehensive notation with a symbol on each word, to replace the fragmentary systems previously in use. In particular, it was necessary to invent a range of different conjunctive accents to show how to introduce and elaborate the main motif in longer phrases. (For example, tevir is preceded by mercha, a short flourish, in shorter phrases but by darga, a more elaborate run of notes, in longer phrases.) The system they devised is the one in use today, and is found in Biblical manuscripts such as the Aleppo Codex. A Masoretic treatise called דִּקְדּוּקֵי־הַטְּעָמִים, Diqduqei ha-teʿamim (precise rules of the accents) by Aaron ben Moses ben Asher survives, though both the names and the classification of the accents differ somewhat from those of the present day.

As the accents were (and are) not shown on a Torah scroll, it was found necessary to have a person making hand signals to the reader to show the tune, as in the Byzantine system of neumes. This system of cheironomy survives in some communities to the present day, notably in Italy. It is speculated that both the shapes and the names of some of the accents (e.g. tifcha, literally "hand-breadth") may refer to the hand signals rather than to the syntactical functions or melodies denoted by them. Today in most communities there is no system of hand signals and the reader learns the melody of each reading in advance.

The Tiberian system spread quickly and was accepted in all communities by the 13th century. Each community re-interpreted its reading tradition so as to allocate one short musical motif to each symbol: this process has gone furthest in the Western Ashkenazi and Ottoman (Jerusalem-Sephardi, Syrian etc.) traditions. Learning the accents and their musical rendition is now an important part of the preparations for a bar mitzvah, as this is the first occasion on which a person reads from the Torah in public.

In the early period of the Reform movement there was a move to abandon the system of cantillation and give Scriptural readings in normal speech (in Hebrew or in the vernacular). In recent decades, however, traditional cantillation has been restored in many communities.

=== Different systems for different sets of books ===
There are two systems of cantillation marks in the Tanakh. One is used in the twenty-one prose books, while the other appears in the three poetical books of Psalms, Proverbs and Job. Except where otherwise stated, this article describes the "prose" system.

== Traditional roots ==
The current system of cantillation notes has its historical roots in the Tiberian masorah. The cantillation signs are included in Unicode as characters U+0591 through U+05AF in the Hebrew block.

=== Different naming according to rites ===
The names of some of the cantillation signs differ in the Ashkenazi, Sephardi, Italian and Yemenite traditions; for example Sephardim use qadma to mean what Ashkenazim call pashta, and azla to mean what Ashkenazim call qadma. In this article, as in almost all Hebrew grammars, the Ashkenazi terminology is used. The names in other traditions are shown in the table below.

== Purpose ==
=== Synagogue use ===
A primary purpose of the cantillation signs is to guide the chanting of the sacred texts during public worship. Very roughly speaking, each word of text has a cantillation mark at its primary accent and associated with that mark is a musical phrase that tells how to sing that word. The reality is more complex, with some words having two or no marks and the musical meaning of some marks dependent upon context. There are different sets of musical phrases associated with different sections of the Bible. The music varies with different Jewish traditions and individual cantorial styles.

=== Explanation to text ===
The cantillation signs also provide information on the syntactical structure of the text and some say they are a commentary on the text itself, highlighting important ideas musically. The tropes are not random strings but follow a set and describable grammar. The very word ta'am, used in Hebrew to refer to the cantillation marks, literally means "taste" or "sense", the point being that the pauses and intonation denoted by the accents (with or without formal musical rendition) bring out the sense of the passage.

== Functions of cantillation signs in explanation of text ==
The cantillation signs serve three functions:

Functions
Function	Description
Syntax	They divide biblical verses into smaller units of meaning, a function which also gives them a limited but sometimes important role as a source for exegesis. This function is accomplished through the use of various conjunctive signs (which indicate that words should be connected in a single phrase) and especially a hierarchy of dividing signs of various strength which divide each verse into smaller phrases. The function of the disjunctive cantillation signs may be roughly compared to modern punctuation signs such as periods, commas, semicolons, etc.
Phonetics	Most of the cantillation signs indicate the specific syllable where the stress (accent) falls in the pronunciation of a word.
Music	The cantillation signs have musical value: reading the Hebrew Bible with cantillation becomes a musical chant, where the music itself serves as a tool to emphasise the proper accentuation and syntax (as mentioned previously).

=== Syntax ===
In general, each word in the Tanakh has one cantillation sign. This may be either a disjunctive, showing a division between that and the following word, or a conjunctive, joining the two words (like a slur in music). Thus, disjunctives divide a verse into phrases, and within each phrase all the words except the last carry conjunctives. (There are two types of exception to the rule about words having only one sign. A group of words joined by hyphens is regarded as one word so they only have one accent between them. Conversely, a long word may have two—e.g., a disjunctive on the stressed syllable and the related conjunctive two syllables before in place of meteg.)

The disjunctives are traditionally divided into four levels, with lower level disjunctives marking less important breaks.

1. The first level, known as "Emperors", includes sof pasuk / siluk, marking the end of the verse, and atnach / etnachta, marking the middle.
2. The second level is known as "Kings". The usual second level disjunctive is zakef qatan (when on its own, this may be replaced by zakef gadol). This is replaced by tifcha when in the immediate neighborhood of sof pasuk or atnach. A stronger second level disjunctive, used in very long verses, is segol: when it occurs on its own, this becomes shalshelet.
3. The third level is known as "Dukes". The usual third level disjunctive is revia. For musical reasons, this is replaced by zarka when in the vicinity of segol, by pashta or yetiv when in the vicinity of zakef, and by tevir when in the vicinity of tifcha.
4. The fourth level is known as "Counts". These are found mainly in longer verses, and tend to cluster near the beginning of a half-verse: for this reason their musical realisation is usually more elaborate than that of higher level disjunctives. They are pazer, geresh, gershayim, telisha gedola, munach legarmeh and qarne farah.

The general conjunctive is munach. Depending on which disjunctive follows, this may be replaced by mercha, mahpach, darga, qadma, telisha qetannah or yerach ben yomo.

One other symbol is mercha kefulah, double mercha. There is some argument about whether this is another conjunctive or an occasional replacement for tevir.

Disjunctives have a function somewhat similar to punctuation in Western languages. Sof pasuk could be thought of as a full stop, atnach as a semi-colon, second level disjunctives as commas and third level disjunctives as commas or unmarked. Where two words are written in the construct state (for example, pene ha-mayim, "the face of the waters"), the first noun (nomen regens) invariably carries a conjunctive.

The cantillation signs are often an important aid in the interpretation of a passage. For example, the words qol qore bamidbar panu derekh YHWH (Isaiah 40:3) is translated in the Authorised Version as "The voice of him that crieth in the wilderness, Prepare ye the way of the LORD". As the word qore takes the high-level disjunctive zakef katon this meaning is discouraged by the cantillation marks. Accordingly, the New Revised Standard Version translates "A voice cries out: 'In the wilderness prepare the way of the LORD, ...'" while the New Jewish Publication Society Version has "A voice rings out: 'Clear in the desert a road for the LORD'."

=== Phonetics ===
Most cantillation signs are written on the consonant of the stressed syllable of a word. This also shows where the most important note of the musical motif should go.

A few signs always go on the first or last consonant of a word. This may have been for musical reasons, or it may be to distinguish them from other accents of similar shape. For example, pashta, which goes on the last consonant, otherwise looks like kadma, which goes on the stressed syllable.

Some signs are written (and sung) differently when the word is not stressed on its last syllable. Pashta on a word of this kind is doubled, one going on the stressed syllable and the other on the last consonant. Geresh is doubled unless it occurs on a non-finally-stressed word or follows kadma (to form the kadma ve-azla phrase).

=== Music ===
Cantillation signs guide the reader in applying a chant to Biblical readings. This chant is technically regarded as a ritualized form of speech intonation rather than as a musical exercise like the singing of metrical hymns: for this reason Jews always speak of saying or reading a passage rather than of singing it. (In Yiddish the word is leynen 'read', derived from Latin legere, giving rise to the Jewish English verb "to leyn".)

The musical value of the cantillation signs serves the same function for Jews worldwide, but the specific tunes vary between different communities. The most common tunes today are as follows.

- Among Ashkenazi Jews:
  - The Polish-Lithuanian melody, used by Ashkenazic descendants of eastern European Jews, is the most common tune in the world today, both in Israel and the diaspora.
  - The Ashkenazic melodies from central and western European Jewry are used far less today than before the Holocaust, but still survive in some communities, especially in Great Britain. They are of interest because a very similar melody was notated by Johann Reuchlin as in use in Germany in his day (15th–16th century).
  - The melody used by Ashkenazic Jews in Italy.
- Among Sephardi and Mizrahi Jews:
  - The "Jerusalem Sephardic" (Sepharadi-Yerushalmi) melody is now the most widely used Sephardic melody in Israel, and is also used in some Sephardic communities in the diaspora.
  - The Greek/Turkish/Balkan, Syrian and Egyptian melodies are related to the Jerusalem Sephardic melody. They are more sparsely used in Israel today, but are still heard in the Diaspora, especially in America.
  - There are two Iraqi melodies, one close to the Syrian melody and traditionally used in Baghdad (and sometimes in Israel), and another more distinctive melody originating in Mosul and generally used in the Iraqi Jewish diaspora, especially in India.
  - The Moroccan melody is used widely by Jews of Moroccan descent, both in Israel and in the diaspora, especially France. It subdivides into a Spanish-Moroccan melody, used in the northern coastal strip, and an Arab-Moroccan melody, used in the interior of the country, with some local variations. The Algerian, Tunisian and Libyan melodies are somewhat similar, and may be regarded as intermediate between the Moroccan and "Jerusalem Sephardic" melodies.
  - The Spanish and Portuguese melody is in common use in the Spanish and Portuguese Sephardi communities of Livorno, Gibraltar, the Netherlands, England, Canada, the United States and other places in the Americas. It is closely related to the Spanish-Moroccan melody and has some resemblance to the Iraqi (Mosul and diaspora) melody.
- Italian melodies are still used in Italy, as well as in two Italian minyanim in Jerusalem and one in Netanya. These vary greatly locally: for example the melody used in Rome resembles the Spanish and Portuguese melody rather than those used in northern Italy.
- Romaniote style of cantillation is used today in Greece, Israel, and New York and is rooted in the Byzantine tradition
- The Yemenite melody can be heard in Israel primarily, but also in some American cities.
- There is also a Persian Jewish melody for the Torah and a very distinct melody for the Haftarah.

==== Reconstructed melody ====
There has been an attempted reconstruction of the original melody by Suzanne Haïk-Vantoura, on the basis of the shapes and positions of the marks and without any reference to existing melodies, as described in her book La musique de la Bible révélée and her records. That reconstruction assumes the signs represent the degrees of various musical scales, that is individual notes, which puts it at odds with all existing traditions where the signs invariably represent melodic motives. Some musicologists have rejected her results as dubious and her methodology as flawed. A similar reconstructive proposal was developed by American composer and pianist Jeffrey Burns and posthumously published in 2011.

== Traditional melodies ==
=== Ashkenazic melodies ===
In the Ashkenazic musical tradition for te'araim, each of the local geographical customs includes a total of six major and numerous minor separate melodies for te'araim:

- Torah and Haftarot (3 melodies)
  1. Torah (general melody for the whole year) Example
  2. Torah – special melody for Rosh Hashanah and Yom Kippur. This tune is also employed on Simhat Torah in various degrees (depending on the specific community). Echoes of it can also be heard for certain verses in the Torah reading for fast days in some communities.
    - There are a number of variants employed for special sections, such as those for the Aseret haDibrot (Ten Commandments), Az Yashir (Song of the Sea), and the list of Masa'ot.
    - In all Torah modes, there is a "coda" motif that is used for the last few words of each reading.
    - There is a special coda used at the end of each of the five books of the Torah that leads to the traditional exclamation of "Hazak Hazak V'Nithazek!" (Be strong, be strong so we are strengthened!).
  3. Haftarot Example
    - In the haftarah mode, there is also a "coda" motif. In the Western Ashkenazic mode, this is applied to the end of every verse. A different coda is used at the end of the haftarah among both Eastern and Western Ashkenazim, modulating from minor to major to introduce the following blessing.
    - This is also the tune that is applied when reading the non-haftarah portions of the books of the Prophets and the latter Writings (Daniel, Ezra-Nehemiah, and Chronicles), although this usage is largely theoretical, as these are not subject to public reading as the other sections and books are.
- The Five Megillot (3 melodies are employed for these five scrolls)
  4. Esther – a mostly light and joyous tune with elements of drama and foreboding used for the Megillat Esther on Purim. The coda at the end of each pasuk (verse) modulates from major to minor to produce a more serious effect. Certain short passages pertaining to the destruction of the temple are customarily read in the tune of Lamentations. There are also additional musical customs, such as saying the word סוס (horse) with a neighing sound, not indicated by the cantillation.
  5. Lamentations – a mournful tune. Echoes of it can also be heard for certain verses in Esther and in the Torah reading preceding the Ninth of Av. The Haftarot preceding and during the Ninth of Av also use this melody, when read in non-Hasidic shuls. Example
  6. The three remaining scrolls are publicly read within Ashkenazic communities during the three pilgrimage festivals. All are read in the same melody, which may be considered the "general" melody for the megillot: the Song of Songs on Passover; Ruth on Shavuot; Ecclesiastes on Sukkot.

The Ashkenazic tradition preserves no melody for the special cantillation notes of Psalms, Proverbs, and Job, which were not publicly read in the synagogue by European Jews. However, the Ashkenazic yeshiva known as Aderet Eliyahu, or (more informally) Zilberman's, in the Old City of Jerusalem, uses an adaptation of the Syrian cantillation-melody for these books, and this is becoming more popular among other Ashkenazim as well.

=== Sephardic and Eastern melodies ===
At the beginning of the twentieth century there was a single Ottoman-Sephardic tradition (no doubt with local variations) covering Turkey, Syria, Israel and Egypt. Today the Jerusalem-Sephardic, Syrian, Egyptian and Baghdadi melodies recognisably belong to a single family. For example, in these traditions the Torah reading is always or almost always in Maqam Sigah. There are some variations, among individual readers as well as among communities: for example the Egyptian melody is related to the more elaborate and cantorial form of the Syrian melody and was transitioning toward Maqam Huzzam before the mass expulsion in 1950. The Karaite tradition, being based on the Egyptian, also forms part of this group.

Another recognisable family consists of the Iraqi (Mosul and Iraqi diaspora), Spanish-Moroccan and Spanish and Portuguese melodies. The probable reason for the occurrence of similar melodies at opposite ends of the Arab world is that they represent the remains of an old Arab-Jewish tradition not overlaid by the later Ottoman-Sephardic tradition that spread to the countries in between. There may also have been some convergence between the London Spanish and Portuguese and Iraqi melodies during British rule in India and the British Mandate of Mesopotamia.

The Jews of North Africa, the Middle East, Central Asia and Yemen all had local musical traditions for cantillation. When these Jewish communities emigrated (mostly to Israel) during the twentieth century, they brought their musical traditions with them. But as the immigrants themselves grew older, many particular national melodies began to be forgotten, or to become assimilated into the "Jerusalem Sephardic" melting-pot.

As with the Ashkenazim, there is one tune for Torah readings and a different tune for haftarot. Spanish and Portuguese Jews have a special tune for the Ten Commandments when read according to the ta'am elyon, known as "High Na'um", which is also used for some other words and passages which it is desired to emphasize. Other communities, such as the Syrian Jews, observe the differences between the two sets of cantillation marks for the Ten Commandments but have no special melody for ta'am 'elyon. There is no special tune for Rosh Hashanah and Yom Kippur in any Sephardic tradition. As with Ashkenazim, the normal musical value of cantillation signs is replaced by a "coda" motif at the end of each Torah reading and of each haftarah verse (though there is no special coda for the end of the haftarah), suggesting a common origin for the Sephardi and Ashkenazi chants.

Eastern Jewish communities have no liturgical tradition of reading Ecclesiastes, and there is no public liturgical reading of Song of Songs on Passover, though brief extracts may be read after the morning service during the first half of Nisan. (Individuals may read it after the Passover Seder, and many communities recite it every Friday night.) There are specialized tunes for Song of Songs, Ruth, Esther and Lamentations. The prose passages at the beginning and end of the book of Job may be read either to the tune of Song of Songs or to that of Ruth, depending on the community. The Ruth tune is generally the "default" tune for any book of the Ketuvim (Hagiographa) that does not have a tune of its own.

Unlike the Ashkenazic tradition, the eastern traditions, in particular that of the Syrian Jews, include melodies for the special cantillation of Psalms, Proverbs and the poetic parts of Job. In many eastern communities, Proverbs is read on the six Sabbaths between Passover and Shavuot, Job on the Ninth of Av, and Psalms are read on a great many occasions. The cantillation melody for Psalms can also vary depending on the occasion. The Spanish and Portuguese Jews have no tradition for the rendering of the Psalms according to the cantillation marks, but the melody used for several psalms in the evening service is noticeably similar to that of Syrian psalm cantillation, and may represent the remnants of such a tradition.

=== Yemenite melodies ===
Yemenite cantillation has a total of eight distinctive motifs, falling within four main patterns:

- molikh ('moving') used for the conjunctives and some minor disjunctives
- mafsik ('pausing') for most third level disjunctives
- ma'amid ('elongating') for most second level disjunctives; and
- the patterns of etnaḥa and silluq (sof pasuk).

This is true equally of the system used for the Torah and the systems used for the other books. It appears to be a relic of the Babylonian system, which also recognised only eight types of disjunctive and no conjunctives.

=== Learning melodies ===
Some communities had a simplified melody for the Torah, used in teaching it to children, as distinct from the mode used in synagogue. (This should not be confused with the lernen steiger used for studying the Mishnah and Talmud.) For example, the Yemenite community teaches a simplified melody for children, to be used both in school and when they are called to read the sixth aliyah. The simplified melody is also used for the reading of the Targum, which is generally performed by a young boy.

Conversely, the Syrian community knows two types of Torah cantillation, a simpler one for general use and a more elaborate one used by professional hazzanim. It is probable that the simpler melody was originally a teaching mode. Today, however, it is the mode in general use, and is also an ancestor of the "Jerusalem-Sephardic" melody.

Some communities, such as the Portuguese community of Amsterdam, have a simplified melody for the Prophets for study purposes, distinct from that used in reading the Haftarah: the distinction is mentioned in one medieval Sephardic source.

== Names and shapes of the te'amim ==
=== Names in different traditions ===
The following table shows the names of the te'amim in the Ashkenazi, Sephardi, and Italian traditions together with their Unicode symbols.

- Cantillation marks are rarely supported in many default Hebrew fonts. They should display, however, on Windows with one of these fonts installed by default in Microsoft Office:
  Times New Roman, Arial, Gisha, Microsoft Sans Serif, Courier New
- Additional fonts with support for cantillation marks can be found at the Culmus project in the Taamey Culmus section, which includes the following fonts:
  Taamey Frank CLM, Taamey Ashkenaz, Shofar, Taamey David CLM, Keter Aram Tsova, Keter YG
- Some further fonts with support for cantillation marks include:
  Cardo, Ezra SIL, SBL BibLit, SBL Hebrew, Taamey D, Code2000
- The following default Hebrew fonts do not display these marks:
  David, Miriam, Rod, FrankRuehl (as well as serif, sans-serif, monospaced unless they are configured manually)
- The mark for U+05AA (yerach ben yomo or galgal) should not be drawn with the bottom vertical tick used in the mark drawn for U+05A2 (atnach hafukh); however, some fonts draw these marks identically.

Name	Symbol	Unicode	Ashkenazi	Sephardi	Italian
Sof passuk	ב ׃	U+05C3	סוֹף פָּסֽוּק; Sof pasuq	סוֹף פָּסֽוּק; Sof pasuq	סוֹף פָּסֽוּק; Sof pasuq
Etnachta	ב֑	U+0591	אֶתְנַחְתָּ֑א; Etnachta	אַתְנָ֑ח; Atnach	אַתְנָ֑ח; Atnach
Segol	ב֒	U+0592	סֶגּוֹל֒ Segol	סְגוֹלְתָּא֒ Segolta	שְׁרֵי֒ Shere
Shalshelet	ב֓	U+0593	שַׁלְשֶׁ֓לֶת; Shalshelet	שַׁלְשֶׁ֓לֶת; Shalshelet	שַׁלְשֶׁ֓לֶת; Shalshelet
Zakef katan	ב֔	U+0594	זָקֵף קָטָ֔ן; Zaqef Qatan	זָקֵף קָט֔וֹן; Zaqef Qaton	זָקֵף קָט֔וֹן; Zaqef Qaton
Zakef gadol	ב֕	U+0595	זָקֵף גָּד֕וֹל; Zaqef Gadol	זָקֵף גָּד֕וֹל; Zaqef Gadol	זָקֵף גָּד֕וֹל; Zaqef Gadol
Tifcha	ב֖	U+0596	טִפְחָ֖א; Tifcha	טַרְחָ֖א; Tarcha	טַרְחָ֖א; Tarcha
Revia	ב֗	U+0597	רְבִ֗יעַ Revia	רָבִ֗יעַ Ravia	רְבִ֗יעַ Revia
Zarka	ב֮	U+05AE	זַרְקָא֮ Zarqa	זַרְקָא֮ Zarqa	זַרְקָא֮ Zarqa
Pashta	ב֙	U+0599	פַּשְׁטָא֙ Pashta	קַדְמָא֙ Qadma	פַּשְׁטָא֙ Pashta
Shene pashtin	ב֨ב֙	U+0599, U+05A8	שְׁנֵ֨י פַּשְׁטִין֙ Shene pashtin	תְּרֵ֨י קַדְמִין֙ Tere qadmin	(שְׁנֵי) פַּ֨שְׁטִין֙ (Shene) pashtin
Yetiv	ב֚	U+059A	יְ֚תִיב; Yetiv	(שׁוֹפָר) יְ֚תִיב (Shofar) yetiv	שׁ֚וֹפָר יְתִיב; Shofar yetiv
Tevir	ב֛	U+059B	תְּבִ֛יר; Tevir	תְּבִ֛יר; Tevir	תְּבִ֛יר; Tevir
Pazer	ב֡	U+05A1	פָּזֵ֡ר; Pazer	פָּזֶר גָּד֡וֹל; Pazer gadol	פָּזֶר גָּד֡וֹל; Pazer gadol
Qarne farah	ב֟	U+059F	קַרְנֵי פָרָ֟ה; Qarne farah	קַרְנֵי פָרָ֟ה; Qarne farah	קַרְנֵי פָרָ֟ה; Qarne farah
Telisha gedola	ב֠	U+05A0	תְּ֠לִישָׁא גְדוֹלָה; Telisha gedolah	תַּ֠לְשָׁא; Talsha	תִּ֠רְצָה; Tirtzah
Geresh	ב֜	U+059C	אַזְלָא-גֵּ֜רֵשׁ Azla Geresh	גְּרִ֜ישׁ Gerish	גֵּ֜רֵשׁ Geresh
Gershayim	ב֞	U+059E	גֵּרְשַׁ֞יִם; Gershayim	שְׁנֵי גְרִישִׁ֞ין; Shene gerishin	שְׁנֵי גְרֵישִׁ֞ין; Shene ghereshin
Paseq	ב׀	U+05C0	מֻנַּח לְגַרְמֵ֣הּ׀ Munach legarmeh	פָּסֵ֣ק׀ Paseq	לְגַרְמֵ֣הּ׀ Legarmeh
Mercha	ב֥	U+05A5	מֵרְכָ֥א; Merkha	מַאֲרִ֥יךְ Maarikh	מַאֲרִ֥יךְ Maarikh
Munach	ב֣	U+05A3	מֻנַּ֣ח; Munach	שׁוֹפָר הוֹלֵ֣ךְ Shofar holekh	שׁוֹפָר עִלּ֣וּי; Shofar 'illui
Mahpach	ב֤	U+05A4	מַהְפַּ֤ךְ Mahpakh	(שׁוֹפָר) מְהֻפָּ֤ךְ (Shofar) mehuppakh	שׁוֹפָר הָפ֤וּךְ Shofar hafukh
Darga	ב֧	U+05A7	דַּרְגָּ֧א; Darga	דַּרְגָּ֧א; Darga	דַּרְגָּ֧א; Darga
Kadma	ב֨	U+05A8	קַדְמָ֨א; Qadma	אַזְלָ֨א; Azla	קַדְמָ֨א; Qadma
Telisha ketana	ב֩	U+05A9	תְּלִישָׁא קְטַנָּה֩ Telisha qetannah	תַּלְשָׁא֩ Talsha	תַּרְסָא֩ Tarsa
Mercha kefula	ב֦	U+05A6	מֵרְכָא כְּפוּלָ֦ה; Merekha kefula	תְּרֵי טַעֲמֵ֦י; Tere taame	תְּרֵין חוּטְרִ֦ין; Teren chutrin
Yerach ben yomo	ב֪	U+05AA	יֶרַח בֶּן יוֹמ֪וֹ Yerach ben yomo	יָרֵחַ בֶּן יוֹמ֪וֹ Yareach ben yomo	יֶרַח בֶּן יוֹמ֪וֹ Yerach ben yomo

The following additional symbols are found in the three poetical books; their names do not differ among the various traditions.

Name	Symbol	Unicode	Hebrew name in Unicode
Geresh muqdam	ב֝	U+059D	גֵּרֵשׁ מֻקְדָּם֝
Atnach hafukh	ב֢	U+05A2	אֶתְנָח הָפוּךְ֢
Ole	ב֫	U+05AB	עוֹלֶה֫
Illuy	ב֬	U+05AC	עִלּוּי֬
Dechi	ב֭	U+05AD	דֶּחִי֭
Tsinnorit	ב֘	U+0598	צִנּוֹרִת֘

=== Zarqa tables ===
For learning purposes, the t'amim are arranged in a traditional order of recitation called a "zarqa table", showing both the names and the symbols themselves. These tables are often printed at the end of a Chumash (Hebrew Pentateuch).

The order of recitation bears some relation to the groups in which the signs are likely to occur in a typical Biblical verse, but differs in detail between different communities. Below are traditional Ashkenazi and Sephardi orders, though variations are found in both communities.

==== Sephardic ====
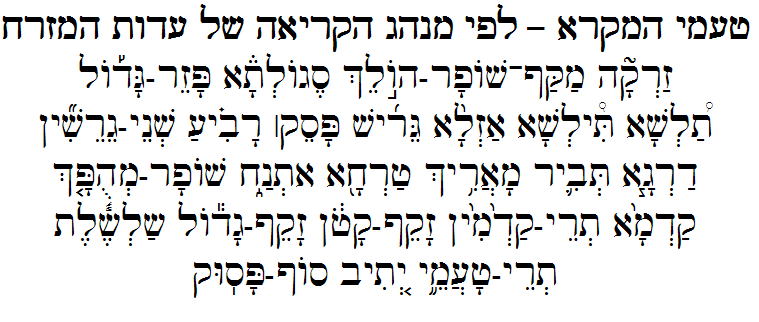

=== Meanings of the names ===
Azla
"Going away", because it is often the end of the phrase 'Qadma ve'Azla' (lit. "go forward and depart", "start and leave", or "get up and go", perhaps for its sound).
Darga
"stairstep" from its shape or sound.
Etnaḥta/Atnaḥ
"Pause", "rest", because it is the primary break in a verse, marked by a short pause. Because etnaḥta marks the halfway point in a verse, citing biblical verses, particularly in the poetic sections, some scholars will refer to everything up to the etnaḥta as "a", and everything after as "b" (example: Genesis 1:1a).
Azla Geresh/Geresh
"Azla divorced" (if called "azla geresh") or "expulsion/divorce" (if called just "geresh"). So called because it is often "partnered" with the Qadma (as an Azla) but here appears on its own, "separated."
Gershayim
Double Geresh, from its appearance and tune.
Mahpakh
"Turning round". Originally written like a sideways U, like a U turn. In printed books, it has a V shape, possibly because that was easier for the early printers to make. In Sephardi communities it is called shofar mehuppach, "reversed horn", either because of the above reason, or because it faces the other way from shofar holekh (munakh).
Merkha/Ma'arikh
"Lengthener", because it prolongs the word that follows. In modern usage it is sometimes translated as "comma", but this usage is taken from the cantillation's appearance, and is misleading because merkha is conjunctive, whereas a comma marks a break.
Merkha-kefulah/Tere Ta`ameh
"Kefulah" means "doubled", because it looks like two adjacent merkhas; alternatively, "Tere" means "two", because it looks like two adjacent Ma`arikhs. There are only five occurrences in the whole Torah: Gen. 27:25, Ex. 5:15, Lev. 10:1, Num. 14:3, and Num. 32:42.
Munakh/Shophar Holekh
"Resting", because it is shaped like a horn lying on its side.:In Sephardi communities it is called shofar holekh, "going-horn", because it appears as a horn, and makes the word it appears under "go" into the following word (i.e., it has the grammatical function of making the word secondary to the following one).:Munakh legarmeh "munakh by itself" is a disjunctive, used mainly before revia, but occasionally before a pazer. It may be distinguished from ordinary munakh by the dividing line (pesiq) following the word.
Pashta
"Stretching out", because its shape is an abstraction of a hand stretched forward.
Pazer
"Lavish" or "strewn", because it has a complex tune with many notes.:In Sephardi communities, its called Pazer Gadol, meaning "great Pazer", for the same reason.
Qadma
"precede", "before", "prior [one]", "going forward", "starting"; Always occurs at the beginning of a phrase (often before other conjunctives) with a shape like a hand leaning forward, identical to Pashta (see above). In particular it is the first member of the Qadma ve-Azla pair (see Azla, above).
Rebhiya`/Rabhiya`
Usually Aramaic for "fourth [in a sequence]", for obscure reasons. Likely due to its four-note tune.: Some Ashkenazi Jews call it "revi'i" by a process of folk etymology. Since in many printings it appears as a diamond-shape above the word, folk etymology associates "revi'a" with "ravua", meaning "square". In some printings it appears as a solid circle. A more likely explanation is that it is from the Aramaic for "crouching", referring to its position vertically above the word and its descending tone.
Segol
"grape-bunch" (from its shape, which looks like a bunch of grapes), not to be confused with the vowel of the same name, which appears beneath a letter, whereas this appears above. The cantillation mark is an inversion of the vowel.
Shalshelet
"Chain", either from its appearance or because it is a long chain of notes. There are only four occurrences in the whole Torah: Gen. 19:16, 24:12, 39:8, and Lev. 8:23.
Sof Pasuk
"End [of] verse": The last note of every verse, sometimes called silluq (taking leave).
Telisha Gedolah/Qetannah
"Detached" because they are never linked to the following note as one musical phrase. Gedolah = great (long); Qetannah = small (short);: Sephardim have different names for each of the two: Telisha Qetannah is called Tarsa; Telisha Gedolah is called Talshah, also meaning "Detached".:
Tevir
"broken", "downward tumble", because of its tune. Frequently paired with darga.
Tifqha/Tarqha
"Diagonal", or "hand-breadth". Originally drawn as a straight diagonal line. In printed books, it is curved, apparently to make it a mirror image of Mercha, with which it is usually paired (the two together could be regarded as forming a slur). The name "tifcha" may be an allusion to a hand signal.:Sephardim call it Tarqha, meaning "dragging", due to its tune, and possibly its grammatical function.:
Yetibh
Short for Shofar yetibh, "Resting horn" or "sitting horn", probably because of its shape of a horn sitting upright.:
Zaqef Qaton/Gadol
"Upright/erect", from their vertical shape, or from their grammatical function to separate a phrase whatever follows.:Zaqef Gadol = great Zaqef, named so for its longer tune and because it more strongly separates the word as its own phrase.:Zaqef Qatton = small Zaqef, named so for its relatively shorter tune and weaker grammatical function as compared to Zaqef Gadol.:
Zarqa
"Scatterer", because of its complex tune of a scattering of notes.

Verse 90 of Parashat Mas`ei (Numbers 35 verse 5) contains the following two notes, found nowhere else in the Torah:

Qarne Farah
"Horns of a cow" named so because it resembles the horns of a cow.:
Yerach ben Yomo
"Moon of its day" [i.e. day-old moon] because it looks like a crescent moon; sometimes called galgal (circle).

== Sequences ==
The rules governing the sequence of cantillation marks are as follows.

1. A verse is divided into two half verses, the first ending with, and governed by, etnachta, and the second ending with, and governed by, sof pasuk. A very short verse may have no etnachta and be governed by sof pasuk alone.
2. A half verse may be divided into two or more phrases marked off by second-level disjunctives.
3. A second-level phrase may be divided into two or more sub-phrases marked off by third-level disjunctives.
4. A third-level phrase may be divided into two or more sub-phrases marked off by fourth-level disjunctives.
5. The last subdivision within a phrase must always be constituted by a disjunctive one level down, chosen to fit the disjunctive governing the phrase and called (in the Table below) its "near companion". Thus, a disjunctive may be preceded by a disjunctive of its own or a higher level, or by its near companion, but not by any other disjunctive of a lower level than its own.
6. The other subdivisions within a phrase are constituted by the "default" disjunctive for the next lower level (the "remote companion").
7. Any disjunctive may or may not be preceded by one or more conjunctives, varying with the disjunctive in question.
8. A disjunctive constituting a phrase on its own (i.e. not preceded by either a near companion or a conjunctive) may be substituted by a stronger disjunctive of the same level, called in the Table the "equivalent isolated disjunctive".

Main disjunctive	Preceding conjunctive(s)	Nearest preceding lower level disjunctive ("near companion")	Other lower level disjunctives ("remote companion")	Equivalent isolated disjunctive
First level disjunctives
Sof pasuk	Mercha	Tifcha	Zaqef qaton
Etnachta	Munach	Tifcha	Zaqef qaton
Second level disjunctives
Segol	Munach	Zarqa	Revia	Shalshelet
Zaqef qaton	Munach	Pashta	Revia	Zaqef gadol
Tifcha	Mercha; Darga Mercha-kefulah	Tevir	Revia
Third level disjunctives
Revia	Munach; Darga Munach	Munach legarmeh	Geresh, Telisha gedolah, Pazer
Zarqa	Munach or Mercha; Qadma Munach or Qadma Mercha	Geresh/Azla/Gershayim	Telisha gedolah, Pazer
Pashta	Mahpach; Qadma Mahpach (occasionally Mercha or Qadma Mercha)	Geresh/Azla/Gershayim	Telisha gedolah, Pazer	Yetiv
Tevir	Mercha or Darga; Qadma Mercha or Qadma Darga	Geresh/Azla/Gershayim	Telisha gedolah, Pazer
Fourth level disjunctives
Geresh/Azla	Qadma; Telisha qetannah Qadma			Gershayim
Telisha gedolah	Munach
Pazer	Munach
Qarne farah	Yerach ben yomo

=== Groups ===
The following sequences are commonly found:

==== First-level phrases ====
(Mercha) Tifcha (Mercha) Sof-Pasuk [Sephardic: Ma׳ariqh Tarqha Ma׳ariqh Sof-Pasuq]
The group that occurs at the end of each pasuk (verse), and always includes the Sof-Pasuk at the very minimum. Either or both of the merchas may be omitted.
(Mercha) Tifcha (Munach) Etnachta [Sephardic: Ma'ariqh Tarqha Shofar-holekh Atnaqh]
One of the most common groups, but can only appear once in each pasuk. Tifcha can appear without a Mercha, but Mercha cannot appear without a Tifcha (or other following disjunctive). Etnachta can appear without a Munach, but Munach cannot appear without an Etnachta (or other following disjunctive). Munach-Etnachta can appear without a Mercha-Tifcha, but a Mercha-Tifcha cannot appear without a Munach-Etnachta (or Etnachta on its own).:

==== Second-level phrases ====
(Mahpach) Pashta (Munach) Zaqef-qaton [Sephardic: Mehuppakh Qadma Shofar-holekh Zaqef-qaton]
One of the most common groups. Pashta can appear without a Mahpach, but a Mahpach cannot appear without a Pashta. Alternatively, Yetiv can appear on its own in place of Pashta. Zaqef Qaton can appear without a Munach, but a Munach cannot appear without a Qaton (or other following disjunctive).
Zakef-gadol
Not a part of a group; replaces a Zaqef-qaton sequence.
[Munach] Zarqa [Munach] Segol [Sephardic: Shofar-holekh Zarqa Shofar-holekh Segolta]
Zarqa only occurs before Segol.
Shalshelet
Not a part of a group; replaces a Segol sequence. Occurs only four times in the Torah, and always at the beginning of a verse.:

==== Third-level phrases ====
Munach Paseq Munach Rebhia [Sephardic: Shofar-holekh Paseq Shofar-holekh Rabhia`]
The following combinations occur: Revia on its own; Munach Revia; Darga Munach Revia; Munach-with-Pesiq Revia; Munach-with-Pesiq Munach Revia. (Munach with Pesiq is a disjunctive, separate from Munach proper, and also known as Munach legarmeh, munach on its own.)
Darga Tebhir
Tevir is found either alone or preceded by Darga or Mercha. Darga occasionally precedes other combinations (e.g. Darga Munach Rebhia).
Mercha-Kefula (Sephardic Tere ta'ame)
Occasionally preceded by Darga, but usually on its own. Occurs only five times in the Torah, and once in Haftarah. Its function appears to be similar to Tebhir.:

==== Fourth-level phrases ====
Kadma v'Azla [Sephardic: Azla Geirish]
This pair is known as such when found together, and may precede a Mahpach, a Revi'a group or a Tevir group. A Kadma can also be found without an Azla before a Mahpach, and an Azla without a Kadma is known as Azla-Geresh or simply Geresh. Gershayim on its own fulfils the same function as Kadma v'Azla, in that it can precede either a Mahpach, a Revia group or a Tevir group.
Pazer
Not considered part of a group, but usually followed by a Telisha Ketannah or a Telisha Gedolah. It may be preceded by one or more Munach's.
Telisha-Ketannah/Gedolah [Sephardic: Talsha/Tirsa]
Not considered a part of a group, usually appears individually, sometimes after a Pazer. It often precedes Kadma.
Yerach-ben-yomo Karnei-farah [Sephardic: Yareyach-ben-yomo Karneh-phara]
Occurs only once in the whole Torah, in the parashah Masei, on the words alpayim b'amah (two thousand cubits). It is somewhat equivalent to Munach Pazer.

== Psalms, Proverbs and Job ==
The system of cantillation signs used throughout the Tanakh is replaced by a very different system for these three poetic books. Many of the signs may appear the same or similar at first glance, but most of them serve entirely different functions in these three books. (Only a few signs have functions similar to what they do in the rest of the Tanakh.) The short narratives at the beginning and end of Job use the "regular" system, but the bulk of the book (the poetry) uses the special system. For this reason, these three books are referred to as sifrei emet (Books of Truth), the word emet meaning "truth", but also being an acronym (אמ״ת) for the first letters of the three books (Iyov, Mishle, Tehillim).

A verse may be divided into one, two or three stichs. In a two-stich verse, the first stich ends with atnach. In a three-stich verse, the first stich ends with oleh ve-yored, which looks like mahpach (above the word) followed by tifcha, on either the same word or two consecutive words, and the second stich ends with atnach.

Major disjunctives within a stich are revia qaton (immediately before oleh ve-yored), revia gadol (elsewhere) and tzinnor (which looks like zarqa). The first (or only) stich in a verse may be divided by dechi, which looks like tifcha but goes under the first letter of the word to the right of the vowel sign. The last stich in a two- or three-stich verse may be divided by revia megurash, which looks like geresh combined with revia.

Minor disjunctives are pazer gadol, shalshelet gedolah, azla legarmeh (looking like qadma) and mehuppach legarmeh (looking like mahpach): all of these except pazer are followed by a pesiq. Mehuppach without a pesiq sometimes occurs at the beginning of a stich.

All other accents are conjunctives.

== Mishnah and Talmud ==
Some manuscripts of early Rabbinic literature contain marks for partial or systematic cantillation. This is true of the Sifra, and especially of Genizah fragments of the Mishnah.

Today, many communities have a special tune for the Mishnaic passage "Bammeh madliqin" in the Friday night service. Otherwise, there is often a customary intonation used in the study of Mishnah or Talmud, somewhat similar to an Arabic mawwal, but this is not reduced to a precise system like that for the Biblical books. Recordings have been made for Israeli national archives, and Frank Alvarez-Pereyre has published a book-length study of the Syrian tradition of Mishnah reading on the basis of these recordings.

On the relationship between the cantillation marks found in some manuscripts and the intonation used in Ashkenazi Talmud study, see Zelda Kahan Newman, The Jewish Sound of Speech: Talmudic Chant, Yiddish Intonation and the Origins of Early Ashkenaz.

== In Christian missionary uses ==
The Jewish-born Christian convert Ezekiel Margoliouth translated the New Testament to Hebrew in 1865 with cantillation marks added. It is the only completely cantillated translation of the New Testament. The translation was published by the London Society for Promoting Christianity Amongst the Jews.

== See also ==
- Torah reading
- Haftarah
- Megillot
- Yemenite Hebrew
- Bar and Bat Mitzvah
- Melody type
- Tone (linguistics)
