= Yetiv =

Yetiv
יְ֚תִיב / ֚ / ק֚וֹל
cantillation
Sof passuk	׃	Paseq	׀
Etnakhta/atnakh	֑	Segol	֒
Shalshelet	֓	Zakef katan	֔
Zakef gadol	֕	Tifcha/tarkha	֖
Rivia	֗	Zarka	֘
Pashta	֙	Yetiv	֚
Tevir	֛	Geresh	֜
Geresh muqdam	֝	Gershayim	֞
Karne parah	֟	Telisha gedola/talsha	֠
Pazer	֡	Atnah hafukh	֢
Munakh/shofar holekh	֣	Mahpach	֤
Merkha/ma’arikh	֥	Mercha kefula	֦
Darga	֧	Qadma	֨
Telisha qetana/tarsa	֩	Yerah ben yomo	֪
Ole	֫	Illuy	֬
Dehi	֭	Tsinnorit	֮

Yetiv (Hebrew: יְתִיב) is a cantillation mark found in the Torah, Haftarah, and other books of the Hebrew Bible. It replaces the Pashta when these two conditions are fulfilled : it is not preceded by any conjunctive (mesharet), and the word is prototonic.

The Yetiv uses the same < symbol as the Mahpach, but when it is present, the < comes at the beginning of the word, unlike in a Mahpach, it is placed under the letter of the first syllable that is stressed. It is found to the right of the vowel. There is also no Pashta. In print, the Yetiv will sometimes be distinguished from the Mahapach by being more acutely angled, but in the identical position.

Yetiv occurs in the Torah 356 times.

The Hebrew word יְתִיב translates into English as sitting.

== Total occurrences ==
Book	Number of appearances
Torah	356
Genesis	79
Exodus	90
Leviticus	50
Numbers	72
Deuteronomy	65
Nevi'im	368
Ketuvim	179

== Melody ==
The Yetiv starts off with a very high note, then drops low very suddenly.
