= Zarka (trope) =

Zarqa
זַרְקָא֮ / ֮ / אֱלֹהִים֮
cantillation
Sof passuk	׃	Paseq	׀
Etnakhta/atnakh	֑	Segol	֒
Shalshelet	֓	Zakef katan	֔
Zakef gadol	֕	Tifcha/tarkha	֖
Rivia	֗	Zarka	֘
Pashta	֙	Yetiv	֚
Tevir	֛	Geresh	֜
Geresh muqdam	֝	Gershayim	֞
Karne parah	֟	Telisha gedola/talsha	֠
Pazer	֡	Atnah hafukh	֢
Munakh/shofar holekh	֣	Mahpach	֤
Merkha/ma’arikh	֥	Mercha kefula	֦
Darga	֧	Qadma	֨
Telisha qetana/tarsa	֩	Yerah ben yomo	֪
Ole	֫	Illuy	֬
Dehi	֭	Tsinnorit	֮

Zarka or zarqa (Hebrew: זַרְקָא, with variant English spellings) is a cantillation mark found in the Torah, Haftarah, and other books of the Hebrew Bible. It is usually found together with the Segol, with a Munach preceding either or both. The symbol for a Zarka is a 90 degrees rotated, inverted S. The Hebrew word זַרְקָא translates as "throwing" and the melody is ascending in Moroccan and Sefardic tradition (with two or one retracements respectively) and descending in the Ashkenazic.

Zarka is a third-level disjunctive (sar) which always precedes the Segol. Thus, Zarka is to the Segol what Pashta is to the Zakef katan and Tevir to the Tipcha.

The conjunctives and fourth-level disjunctives which precedes the Zarka are the same as for Pashta. Revia can also precedes the Zarka, as for Pashta, although we cannot find an alternation of Revia and Zarka as it exists concerning the Pashta.

== Zarka, Tsinnor and Tsinnorit ==
Zarka is also sometimes called tsinnor. Properly speaking, tsinnor is the name it receives when appears on the three poetic books (Job, Proverbs and Psalms, or the א״מת books, from their initials in Hebrew), and zarqa the name it gets on the remaining 21 books of the Hebrew Bible (also known as the prosaic books). Both sets of books use a different cantillation system.

Caution must be taken not to confuse this mark with the very similar mark tsinnorit, which has the same shape but different position and use. They differ in the following:

- Zarqa / tsinnor is always postpositive, which means that it is always placed after the consonant, that is, shows up to the left side: זַרְקָא֮. Tsinnorit is always centered above it: צִנּוֹרִת֘.
- Zarqa / tsinnor is a distinctive cantillation symbol both on the 21 books and the 3 books, while tsinnorit appears only on the 3 books, and always combined with a second mark (merkha or mahapakh) to form a conjunctive symbol (called merkha metsunneret and mahpakh metsunnar, respectively).
- Note that both marks have been wrongly named by Unicode. Zarqa / tsinnor corresponds to Unicode "Hebrew accent zinor", code point U+05AE (where "zinor" is a misspelled form for tsinnor), while tsinnorit maps to "Hebrew accent zarqa", code point U+0598.

== Total occurrences ==
Book	Number of appearances
Torah	371
Genesis	73
Exodus	80
Leviticus	56
Numbers	96
Deuteronomy	66
Nevi'im	186
Ketuvim	182
