= Gershayim (trope) =

Gershayim
גֵּרְשַׁ֞יִם / ֞ / נִפְרְד֞וּ
cantillation
Sof passuk	׃	Paseq	׀
Etnakhta/atnakh	֑	Segol	֒
Shalshelet	֓	Zakef katan	֔
Zakef gadol	֕	Tifcha/tarkha	֖
Rivia	֗	Zarka	֘
Pashta	֙	Yetiv	֚
Tevir	֛	Geresh	֜
Geresh muqdam	֝	Gershayim	֞
Karne parah	֟	Telisha gedola/talsha	֠
Pazer	֡	Atnah hafukh	֢
Munakh/shofar holekh	֣	Mahpach	֤
Merkha/ma’arikh	֥	Mercha kefula	֦
Darga	֧	Qadma	֨
Telisha qetana/tarsa	֩	Yerah ben yomo	֪
Ole	֫	Illuy	֬
Dehi	֭	Tsinnorit	֮

Gershayim (Hebrew: גֵּרְשַׁיִם, with variant English spellings) is a cantillation mark that is found in the Torah, Haftarah, and other books of the Hebrew Bible.

The Hebrew word גֵּרְשַׁיִם translates into English as double geresh.

== Total occurrences ==
Book	Number of appearances
Torah	510
Genesis	113
Exodus	99
Leviticus	76
Numbers	114
Deuteronomy	108
Nevi'im	447
Ketuvim	341
