= Tevir =

Tevir
תְּבִ֛יר / ֛ / וַיְכֻלּ֛וּ
cantillation
Sof passuk	׃	Paseq	׀
Etnakhta/atnakh	֑	Segol	֒
Shalshelet	֓	Zakef katan	֔
Zakef gadol	֕	Tifcha/tarkha	֖
Rivia	֗	Zarka	֘
Pashta	֙	Yetiv	֚
Tevir	֛	Geresh	֜
Geresh muqdam	֝	Gershayim	֞
Karne parah	֟	Telisha gedola/talsha	֠
Pazer	֡	Atnah hafukh	֢
Munakh/shofar holekh	֣	Mahpach	֤
Merkha/ma’arikh	֥	Mercha kefula	֦
Darga	֧	Qadma	֨
Telisha qetana/tarsa	֩	Yerah ben yomo	֪
Ole	֫	Illuy	֬
Dehi	֭	Tsinnorit	֮

Tevir (Hebrew: תְּבִיר, with variant English spellings including T'vir and Tebir) is a cantillation mark commonly found in the Torah, Haftarah, and other Hebrew biblical books. It replaces a Pashta when the Zakef Katan turned into Tifcha.

Its conjunctives (mesharet) are Mercha, Darga, Kadma and Munach. Mercha and Darga are used for the conjunctive which is the closest to the tevir (Darga when there is two syllables or more between them, Mercha otherwise), whereas Kadma and Munach are used for the second one (Munach when the word is stressed in its first syllable, Kadma otherwise).

The Hebrew word תְּבִיר translates into English as broken.

== Total occurrences ==
Book	Number of appearances
Torah	2678
Genesis	623
Exodus	585
Leviticus	417
Numbers	576
Deuteronomy	477
Nevi'im	1837
Ketuvim	1329

== Melody ==
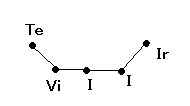
The Tevir is sung on a low tone, going downward at the beginning and upward at the end.
