= Segol (trope) =

Segol
סְגוֹל֒ / ֒ / מִבַּחֻרִים֒
cantillation
Sof passuk	׃	Paseq	׀
Etnakhta/atnakh	֑	Segol	֒
Shalshelet	֓	Zakef katan	֔
Zakef gadol	֕	Tifcha/tarkha	֖
Rivia	֗	Zarka	֘
Pashta	֙	Yetiv	֚
Tevir	֛	Geresh	֜
Geresh muqdam	֝	Gershayim	֞
Karne parah	֟	Telisha gedola/talsha	֠
Pazer	֡	Atnah hafukh	֢
Munakh/shofar holekh	֣	Mahpach	֤
Merkha/ma’arikh	֥	Mercha kefula	֦
Darga	֧	Qadma	֨
Telisha qetana/tarsa	֩	Yerah ben yomo	֪
Ole	֫	Illuy	֬
Dehi	֭	Tsinnorit	֮

Segol (Hebrew: סְגוֹל also known as Segolta, with variant English spellings), is a cantillation mark found in the Torah, Haftarah, and other books of the Hebrew Bible. The Segol occurs together with a preceding Zarka, sometimes with a Munach preceding one or both.

The Segol group is considered to be a disjunctive. It occurs in a verse of three main segments, to mark the end of the first segment, whereas the Etnachta marks the end of the second one.

The Segol can be preceded by one or two conjunctives (meshartim), which are both represented by a Munach.

The third-level disjunctive (sar) which precedes the Segol is the Zarka. When two disjunctives are needed, we generally find two Zarka in a row, even though it is possible two have a Pashta in the first place.

The Hebrew word סְגוֹל translates into English as bunch, referring to a bunch of grapes. This is reflected in its appearance as a three-dot symbol.

== Total occurrences ==
Book	Number of appearances
Torah	368
Genesis	72
Exodus	79
Leviticus	55
Numbers	96
Deuteronomy	66
Nevi'im	181
Ketuvim	173
