= Zakef katan =

Zakef katan
זָקֵף קָטָ֔ן / ֔ / בַּלֵּיל֔וֹת
cantillation
Sof passuk	׃	Paseq	׀
Etnakhta/atnakh	֑	Segol	֒
Shalshelet	֓	Zakef katan	֔
Zakef gadol	֕	Tifcha/tarkha	֖
Rivia	֗	Zarka	֘
Pashta	֙	Yetiv	֚
Tevir	֛	Geresh	֜
Geresh muqdam	֝	Gershayim	֞
Karne parah	֟	Telisha gedola/talsha	֠
Pazer	֡	Atnah hafukh	֢
Munakh/shofar holekh	֣	Mahpach	֤
Merkha/ma’arikh	֥	Mercha kefula	֦
Darga	֧	Qadma	֨
Telisha qetana/tarsa	֩	Yerah ben yomo	֪
Ole	֫	Illuy	֬
Dehi	֭	Tsinnorit	֮

Zakef Katan (Hebrew: זָקֵף קָטָ֔ן, lit. 'upright small'; various romanizations), often referred to simply as katan, is a cantillation mark commonly found in the Torah, Haftarah, and other books of the Hebrew Bible. The note is the anchor and final one of the Katon group, which also can include the Mapach, Pashta, Munach, or Yetiv. It is one of the most common cantillation marks. There is no limit to the number of times the Katan group can appear in a verse, and often, multiple Katan groups appear in succession. The most times in succession the group occurs is four.

The symbol for the Zakef katan is a colon (:). It is placed on the syllable of the word that is accented.

Zakef katan occurs in the Torah 6992 times.

If the zakef katan is preceded by no meshares, and have a secondary stress which is not on the first syllable, it will be then replaced by a Munach. See וַיֹּ֣אמְר֔וּ (Exode 5:3)

When there is only one word in the Katan group, and this word does not have any secondary stress, the Zakef katan is then replaced, by a Zakef gadol when there is less than three syllables before the zakef, and by a Mesiga-Zakef katan, when there is more than four syllables. Compare לִרְאוּבֵ֕ן (Numbers 1:5) and לְיִ֨שָּׂשכָ֔ר (Numbers 1:8).

== The Katan group ==
In the Katan group, the trope can appear in the following patterns:

- Mapach Pashta Munach Zakef-Katan
- Mapach Pashta Zakef-Katan
- Pashta Munach Zakef-Katan
- Pashta Zakef-Katan
- Munach Zakef-Katan
- Zakef-Katan
- Yetiv Munach Zakef-Katan
- Yetiv Zakef-Katan

== Total occurrences ==
Book	Number of appearances
Torah	6992
Genesis	1879
Exodus	1474
Leviticus	987
Numbers	1359
Deuteronomy	1293
Nevi'im	7203
Ketuvim	4843
