= Shalshelet =

Cantillation mark found in the Torah

shalshelet
שַׁלְשֶׁ֓לֶת / ֓ / וַיֹּאמַ֓ר
cantillation
Sof passuk	׃	Paseq	׀
Etnakhta/atnakh	֑	Segol	֒
Shalshelet	֓	Zakef katan	֔
Zakef gadol	֕	Tifcha/tarkha	֖
Rivia	֗	Zarka	֘
Pashta	֙	Yetiv	֚
Tevir	֛	Geresh	֜
Geresh muqdam	֝	Gershayim	֞
Karne parah	֟	Telisha gedola/talsha	֠
Pazer	֡	Atnah hafukh	֢
Munakh/shofar holekh	֣	Mahpach	֤
Merkha/ma’arikh	֥	Mercha kefula	֦
Darga	֧	Qadma	֨
Telisha qetana/tarsa	֩	Yerah ben yomo	֪
Ole	֫	Illuy	֬
Dehi	֭	Tsinnorit	֮

The Shalshelet (Hebrew: שַלְשֶלֶת) is a cantillation mark found in the Torah. It is one of the rarest used, occurring just four times in the entire Torah, in Genesis 19:16, 24:12, and 39:8, and in Leviticus 8:23. The four words accented with the shalshelet mark all occur at the beginning of the verse.

The Hebrew word שַׁלְשֶׁ֓לֶת translates into English as chain. Kabbalistic authors have held that this shows the connection of the worlds by the links of a chain. The symbolism of the Shalshelet is that the subject of the story is wrestling with his inner demons and is undergoing some hesitation in his actions.

It is rendered musically by a long and elaborate string of notes, giving a strong emphasis to the word on which it occurs.

== Purpose ==
The Shalshelet mark is said to be used for various purposes:

- In Genesis 19:16, it is used on the word "VaYitmah'maH" (and he lingered), when Lot is lingering in Sodom as it is marked for destruction, to show Lot's uncertainty.
- In Genesis 24:12, it is used on the word "Vayomer" (and he said), when Abraham's servant is trying to find a woman to marry Abraham's son Isaac, to indicate the hesitation the servant shows.
- In Genesis 39:8, it is used on the word "VaY'maen" (and he refused), during Joseph's attempted seduction by Potiphar's wife, to indicate Joseph's struggle against temptation.
- In Leviticus 8:23, the Shalshelet is used on the word "Vayishchat" (and he slaughtered), because Moses was slaughtering an animal in preparation for the anointment of his brother and nephews as priests, a position he coveted for himself. He is therefore sad he was not given this honor.

Grammatically it is equivalent to segolta, but is never preceded by a conjunctive accent or a disjunctive of a lower class. It is thus related to segolta in the same way as Zakef gadol is related to zakef katan, or Yetiv to Pashta. The shalshelet is always followed by a Paseq.

== Total occurrences ==
Book	Number of appearances
Torah	4
Genesis	3
Exodus	0
Leviticus	1
Numbers	0
Deuteronomy	0
Nevi'im	2
Ketuvim	1

The shalshelet note occurs a total of 7 times in Tanakh outside of the Sifrei Emet. They are:

- ויתמהמה Genesis 19:16
- ויאמר Genesis 24:12
- וימאן Genesis 39:8
- וישחט Leviticus 8:23
- ונבהלו Isaiah 13:8
- ויאמר Amos 1:2
- ואמר-לה Ezra 5:15

Additionally, the note occurs 39 times in Psalms, Proverbs, and Job.

== Melody ==
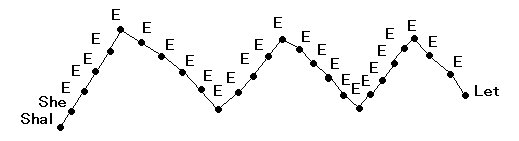
The Shalshelet has a melody similar to that of 3 Pazers. According to Chabad tradition, it is equivalent to 2 Pazers and one Tlisha Gedolah. Rabbi Stolik of Chabad Caltech disputes this "Chabad" tradition. It is approximately 30 notes, though this number varies depending on the word on which it is used.
