= Tsinnorit =

Hebrew cantillation mark

tsinnorit
צִנּוֹרִת֘ / ֘ / רָ֘עֵ֤ב
cantillation
Sof passuk	׃	Paseq	׀
Etnakhta/atnakh	֑	Segol	֒
Shalshelet	֓	Zakef katan	֔
Zakef gadol	֕	Tifcha/tarkha	֖
Rivia	֗	Zarka	֘
Pashta	֙	Yetiv	֚
Tevir	֛	Geresh	֜
Geresh muqdam	֝	Gershayim	֞
Karne parah	֟	Telisha gedola/talsha	֠
Pazer	֡	Atnah hafukh	֢
Munakh/shofar holekh	֣	Mahpach	֤
Merkha/ma’arikh	֥	Mercha kefula	֦
Darga	֧	Qadma	֨
Telisha qetana/tarsa	֩	Yerah ben yomo	֪
Ole	֫	Illuy	֬
Dehi	֭	Tsinnorit	֮

Tsinnorit (Hebrew: צִנּוֹרִת) is a cantillation mark in the Hebrew Bible, found at the 3 poetic books, also known as the Sifrei Emet books (Emet is an acronym of hebrew titles from three books, Job or אִיוֹב in Hebrew, Proverbs or מִשְלֵי, and Psalms or תְהִלִּים). It looks like a 90-degrees rotated, inverted S, placed on top of a Hebrew consonant. Tsinnorit is very similar in shape to Zarka (called tsinnor in the poetic books), but is used differently. It is always combined with a second mark to form a conjunctive symbol:

- Tsinnorit combines with merkha to form merkha metsunneret, a rare variant of merkha that serves mainly sof pasuq.
- Tsinnorit combines with mahapakh to form mehuppakh metsunnar, also a rare mark, variant of mahapakh that serves mainly azla legarmeh but appears also in the other contexts where mahapakh and illuy appear.

This mark has been wrongly named by Unicode. Zarqa/tsinnor corresponds to Unicode "Hebrew accent zinor", code point U+05AE (where "zinor" is a misspelled form for tsinnor), while tsinnorit maps to "Hebrew accent zarqa", code point U+0598.

== See also ==
- Zarka (trope)#Zarka, Tsinnor and Tsinnorit
