= Mercha kefula =

Mercha kefula
מֵרְכָא כְּפוּלָ֦ה / ֦ / ל֦וֹ
cantillation
Sof passuk	׃	Paseq	׀
Etnakhta/atnakh	֑	Segol	֒
Shalshelet	֓	Zakef katan	֔
Zakef gadol	֕	Tifcha/tarkha	֖
Rivia	֗	Zarka	֘
Pashta	֙	Yetiv	֚
Tevir	֛	Geresh	֜
Geresh muqdam	֝	Gershayim	֞
Karne parah	֟	Telisha gedola/talsha	֠
Pazer	֡	Atnah hafukh	֢
Munakh/shofar holekh	֣	Mahpach	֤
Merkha/ma’arikh	֥	Mercha kefula	֦
Darga	֧	Qadma	֨
Telisha qetana/tarsa	֩	Yerah ben yomo	֪
Ole	֫	Illuy	֬
Dehi	֭	Tsinnorit	֮

Mercha kefula (Hebrew: מֵרְכָא כְּפוּלָה, with variant English spellings) is a rare cantillation mark that occurs 5 times in the Torah (once in Genesis, once in Exodus, once in Leviticus, and twice in Numbers) and once in the Haftarah (for Behaalotecha and for Shabbat on Chanuka, in the Book of Zechariah.)

The Hebrew words מֵרְכָא כְּפוּלָה translate into English as double mercha. This name is given since the mark that is used appears like two merchas.

== Purpose ==
Dr. David Weisberg suggested that the merkha kefula mark is found on words that refer to an aggadic tale. For instance, he claimed that the merkha kefula of Zechariah 3:2 is meant to remind the reader of the aggadic legend that the high priest Joshua was literally thrown into a furnace (as recorded in the Talmud, b. Sanhedrin 93a).

== Occurrences ==
The Merkha kefula mark appears in the following locations in the Torah:

- Genesis 27:25
- Exodus 5:15
- Leviticus 10:1
- Numbers 14:3
- Numbers 32:42

It also occurs in the Haftarah at Zechariah 3:2, read on the (first, if there are two) Shabbat for Chanukah and for Parashat Behaalotecha.

=== Total occurrences ===
Book	Number of appearances
Torah	5
Genesis	1
Exodus	1
Leviticus	1
Numbers	2
Deuteronomy	0
Nevi'im	5
Ketuvim	4

The Merkha kefulah note occurs a total of 14 times according to the Leningrad Codex. They are:

- לו Genesis 27:25
- תעשה Exodus 5:15
- לא Leviticus 10:1
- טוב Numbers 14:3
- לה Numbers 32:42
- לא 1 Kings 10:3
- אלה 1 Kings 20:29
- לו Ezekiel 14:4
- ריב Habakkuk 1:3
- זה Zechariah 3:2
- לא Ezra 7:25
- לב Nehemiah 3:38
- לא 2 Chronicles 9:2
- לו 2 Chronicles 20:30
