= Munach =

Munach
מֻנַּ֣ח / ֣ / מָק֣וֹם
cantillation
Sof passuk	׃	Paseq	׀
Etnakhta/atnakh	֑	Segol	֒
Shalshelet	֓	Zakef katan	֔
Zakef gadol	֕	Tifcha/tarkha	֖
Rivia	֗	Zarka	֘
Pashta	֙	Yetiv	֚
Tevir	֛	Geresh	֜
Geresh muqdam	֝	Gershayim	֞
Karne parah	֟	Telisha gedola/talsha	֠
Pazer	֡	Atnah hafukh	֢
Munakh/shofar holekh	֣	Mahpach	֤
Merkha/ma’arikh	֥	Mercha kefula	֦
Darga	֧	Qadma	֨
Telisha qetana/tarsa	֩	Yerah ben yomo	֪
Ole	֫	Illuy	֬
Dehi	֭	Tsinnorit	֮

The Munach (Hebrew: מֻנַּח, also spelled Munah or Munakh), translating to English as "to rest," is a common cantillation sound. In Sephardi and Oriental traditions it is often called Shofar holekh. It is marked with a right angle below the corresponding word.

The munach is found in various groups, including the Katon, Etnachta, and Segol groups. One or more munachs can be followed by many different trope sounds, including Zakef katon, Etnachta, Rivia, Zarka, Segol, and Pazer. It is normally used when the number of syllables in a phrase is so great that an extra note is required to accommodate all the syllables.

The munach is normally a short note. But when it is the first of two munachs followed by a Rivia, it has a longer melody. In this case it may also be called legarmeh (מֻנַּח לְגַרְמֵ֣הּ׀).

== Appearances ==
The munach has the following appearances in the following sequences:

- Katan group: Mahpach-Pashta-Munach-Zakef katan
- Etnachta group: Mercha-Tipcha-Munach-Etnachta
- Segol group: Munach-Zarka-Munach-Segol
- Rivia group: Munach-Munach-Rivia *
- Pazer/Telisha: Munach-Munach-Pazer (sometimes)-Telisha ketana or gedola

* When there are two Munachs before a Rivia (legarmeh), there is generally a vertical line (|) drawn between the words to indicate this.

The munach as shown is not always present in all cases.

Occasionally, in the Katon group, a second Munach will be inserted. This occurs when the words have more syllables, and cannot be accommodated by a single munach.

Munach occurs in the Torah 8777 times. Legarmeh occurs 283 times.

== Total occurrences ==
Book	Munach	Legarmeh
Torah	8777	283
Genesis	2271	60
Exodus	1835	62
Leviticus	1270	45
Numbers	1748	60
Deuteronomy	1653	56
Nevi'im	8624	337
Ketuvim	6150	203

== Melody ==
Note that the melody for trope is different in Torah, Haftarah, and Megillot. Different Jewish communities also use different Torah tropes. The following should not be considered an exhaustive list of all possible cantillations.

=== Rivia group ===
The Munach preceding another Munach before a Rivia:
The Munach immediately preceding a Rivia:

=== Segol group ===
Before a Zarka:
Before a Segol:
