= Tipcha =

Tipcha
טִפְּחָ֖א / ֖ / הָא֖וֹר
cantillation
Sof passuk	׃	Paseq	׀
Etnakhta/atnakh	֑	Segol	֒
Shalshelet	֓	Zakef katan	֔
Zakef gadol	֕	Tifcha/tarkha	֖
Rivia	֗	Zarka	֘
Pashta	֙	Yetiv	֚
Tevir	֛	Geresh	֜
Geresh muqdam	֝	Gershayim	֞
Karne parah	֟	Telisha gedola/talsha	֠
Pazer	֡	Atnah hafukh	֢
Munakh/shofar holekh	֣	Mahpach	֤
Merkha/ma’arikh	֥	Mercha kefula	֦
Darga	֧	Qadma	֨
Telisha qetana/tarsa	֩	Yerah ben yomo	֪
Ole	֫	Illuy	֬
Dehi	֭	Tsinnorit	֮

Tipcha (Hebrew: טִפְּחָא, also spelled Tifkha, Tifcha and other variant English spellings) is a cantillation mark commonly found in the Torah, Haftarah, and other books that are chanted. In Sephardic and Oriental traditions, it is called Tarcha, meaning "dragging" or "effort".

The Tipcha is found in both the Etnachta group as the second member of that group, and in the Sof passuk group, though the melody varies slightly in each. While it is a weak sound, it is considered to be stronger than a Tevir

The Hebrew word טִפְחָא translates into English as diagonal. It is related to the word tefach (טפח, measurement of the palm). The tipcha does not have a separating value of its own, as it is in the middle of a set of words.

Tipcha occurs in the Torah 11,285 times, more than any other trope sound. Tipcha is the only trope sound to appear more than 10,000 times in the Torah.

The first word of the Torah בראשית (Bereshit) is on a Tipcha.

== Total occurrences ==
Book	Number of appearances
Torah	11,285
Genesis	2968
Exodus	2350
Leviticus	1667
Numbers	2435
Deuteronomy	1865
Nevi'im	9756
Ketuvim	6497

== Melodies ==
Melodies for Tipcha, like other cantillation marks, vary in different traditions. The diagrams below show a possible way of chanting it in the Polish-Lithuanian tradition.

== Occurrence rules ==
In the Etnachta group, the Tipcha will always occur, regardless of whether or not there is a Mercha. Before a Sof Passuk, the Tipcha can only occur in conjunction with a Mercha.
