= Geresh (trope) =

Hebrew cantillation mark

Geresh
גֵּ֜רֵשׁ / ֜ / מָנ֜וֹחַ
cantillation
Sof passuk	׃	Paseq	׀
Etnakhta/atnakh	֑	Segol	֒
Shalshelet	֓	Zakef katan	֔
Zakef gadol	֕	Tifcha/tarkha	֖
Rivia	֗	Zarka	֘
Pashta	֙	Yetiv	֚
Tevir	֛	Geresh	֜
Geresh muqdam	֝	Gershayim	֞
Karne parah	֟	Telisha gedola/talsha	֠
Pazer	֡	Atnah hafukh	֢
Munakh/shofar holekh	֣	Mahpach	֤
Merkha/ma’arikh	֥	Mercha kefula	֦
Darga	֧	Qadma	֨
Telisha qetana/tarsa	֩	Yerah ben yomo	֪
Ole	֫	Illuy	֬
Dehi	֭	Tsinnorit	֮

Geresh (Hebrew: גֵּרֵשׁ, with variant English spellings) is a cantillation mark found in the Torah, Haftarah, and other books of the Hebrew Bible. It is most often found together with the Kadma, in which case the pair is known as Kadma-V'Azla, but it can also be found independently, in which case it is referred to as Azla Geresh or simply as Geresh.

The Geresh occurs 1733 times in the Torah in the Kadma-V'Azla pair, and 1112 times separately.

The Hebrew word גֵּרֵשׁ translates into English as driving out.

== Total occurrences ==
Book	Geresh	Azla
Torah	1112	1733
Genesis	244	427
Exodus	228	373
Leviticus	175	307
Numbers	223	393
Deuteronomy	242	413
Nevi'im	957	1492
Ketuvim	780	1240

== Melody ==
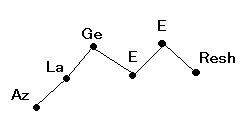
Ashkenazi:
