= Illuy (cantillation) =

Illuy
עִלּוּי / ֬ / דָּבָ֬ר
cantillation
Sof passuk	׃	Paseq	׀
Etnakhta/atnakh	֑	Segol	֒
Shalshelet	֓	Zakef katan	֔
Zakef gadol	֕	Tifcha/tarkha	֖
Rivia	֗	Zarka	֘
Pashta	֙	Yetiv	֚
Tevir	֛	Geresh	֜
Geresh muqdam	֝	Gershayim	֞
Karne parah	֟	Telisha gedola/talsha	֠
Pazer	֡	Atnah hafukh	֢
Munakh/shofar holekh	֣	Mahpach	֤
Merkha/ma’arikh	֥	Mercha kefula	֦
Darga	֧	Qadma	֨
Telisha qetana/tarsa	֩	Yerah ben yomo	֪
Ole	֫	Illuy	֬
Dehi	֭	Tsinnorit	֮

The Illuy or Iluy (Hebrew: עִלּוּי) is a Trope (from Yiddish טראָפּ 'trop') in the Judaic Liturgy. It is one of the cantillation marks used in the three poetic books: Job, the Book of Proverbs, and the Psalms. Accordingly, it is a special mark belonging to the Ta'amei Sifrei Emet (meaning, the accent signs of the books of truth).

== Symbol ==
The symbol of Illuy ( ֬ ) is the same as that of Munach ( ֣ ), except that the Illuy is positioned above the Hebrew letter, while the Munach is positioned below it.

In the Yemeni tradition the Illuy is also called the "Shofar illuy" (Hebrew: שׁוֹפָר עִלּוּי). However, "Shofar illuy" means Munach in the Italian tradition.

== Description ==
The Hebrew word עִלּוּי is a derivative of the word עִלִּי (meaning "upper" or "top"), hence its position above the letter.

== Occurrences ==
The Trope Illuy occurs in only three books.

Part of the Tanach	Illuy
Book of Job	20
Proverbs	14
Psalms	146
Total	180

== Literature ==
- William Wickes: A treatise on the accentuation of the three so-called poetical books on the Old Testament, Psalms, Proverbs, and Job. 1881 (Illuy (cantillation) at the Internet Archive).
- William Wickes: A treatise on the accentuation of the twenty-one so-called prose books of the Old Testament. 1887 (Illuy (cantillation) at the Internet Archive).
- Arthur Davis: The Hebrew accents of the twenty-one Books of the Bible (K"A Sefarim) with a new introduction. 1900 (Illuy (cantillation) at the Internet Archive).
- Francis L. Cohen (1906). "Cantillation". In Isidore Singer (ed.). The Jewish Encyclopedia. Vol. III. New York: KTAV Publishing House. pp. 542–548.
- Solomon Rosowsky (1957). The Cantillation of the Bible. The Five Books of Moses. New York: The Reconstructionist Press.
- James D. Price (1996). Concordance of the Hebrew accents in the Hebrew Bible. Vol. I: Concordance of the Hebrew Accents used in the Pentateuch. Lewiston, New York: Edwin Mellon Press. ISBN 0-7734-2395-8.
- Joshua R. Jacobson (2002). Chanting the Hebrew Bible. The art of cantillation (1. ed.). Philadelphia: Jewish Publication Society. ISBN 0-8276-0693-1.
- Joshua R. Jacobson (2005). Chanting the Hebrew Bible. Student Edition. Philadelphia: The Jewish Publication Society. ISBN 0-8276-0816-0.
