= Yerach ben yomo =

Hebrew cantillation mark

Yerach ben yomo
יֶרַח בֶּן יוֹמ֪וֹ / ֪ / הָי֪וּ
cantillation
Sof passuk/Sof aliyah	׃	Paseq	׀
Etnakhta/atnakh	֑	Segol	֒
Shalshelet	֓	Zakef katan	֔
Zakef gadol	֕	Tifcha/tarkha	֖
Rivia	֗	Zarka	֘
Pashta	֙	Yetiv	֚
Tevir	֛	Geresh	֜
Geresh muqdam	֝	Gershayim	֞
Karne parah	֟	Telisha gedola/talsha	֠
Pazer	֡	Atnah hafukh	֢
Munakh/shofar holekh	֣	Mahpach	֤
Merkha/ma’arikh	֥	Mercha kefula	֦
Darga	֧	Qadma	֨
Telisha qetana/tarsa	֩	Yerah ben yomo	֪
Ole	֫	Illuy	֬
Dehi	֭	Tsinnorit	֮

Yerach ben yomo (Hebrew: יֶרַח בֶּן יוֹמוֹ, with variant English spellings, also known as Galgal), is a cantillation mark that appears only one time in the entire Torah (Numbers 35:5), and once in the Book of Esther. In these occurrences, it is followed immediately by a Karne parah, another mark that is found only once in the entire Torah. The symbol for this trope is an upside-down Etnachta.

The Hebrew words יֵרֶח בֶּן יוֹמוֹ translate into English as day-old moon. Its alternate name גלגל translates into English as wheel.

== In the Torah ==
The rare trope sound in the Torah appears in Numbers 35:5 on the word alpayim (אלפים, two-thousand), which is followed by an equally exclusive Karne Parah on the word b'amah (באמה, cubit), in the first of four occurrences of this phrase in the verse. In each of the phrase's four appearances, a different set of trope. The Yerach ben yomo followed by the Karne Parah is found on the first of these four instances. On the other three, respectively, are a Kadma V'Azla, a Munach Rivi'i, and a Mercha Tipcha.

This is representative of the way mitzvot are performed in real life. When one first performs a mitzvah, being a new experience, it is performed with great enthusiasm. The unusual trope signify the one-time occurrence of the mitzvah being a new experience. The second instance is on a Kadma-V'Azla, a note that is recited highly, showing that the high is still alive. The third is on a Munach-Rivi'i, a note that is going downward, showing that enthusiasm is going down. The fourth and final occurrence being on a Mercha-Tipcha, a common set that are recited in a lazy mode as if they are basically being recited without a melody, show the monotony of performing a mitzvah after performing it so many times.

Altogether, this verse shows the importance of performing a mitzvah that must be performed regularly, despite its monotony. It is an encouragement to bring new light into each time one performs a mitzvah in order to renew the excitement, and even when one cannot do so, to perform the mitzvah regardless.

== In the Book of Esther ==
There is a lesser-known occurrence of the Yerach ben yomo in the Book of Esther, at Esther 7:9. This is found on Haman. In Orthodox Jewish tradition, the Book of Esther is read twice on Purim, and parsha of Masei which includes verse 35:5 is read only once per year, so the recitation of the Yerach ben yomo in Esther therefore is read more often.

== Total occurrences ==
Book	Number of appearances
Torah	1
Genesis	0
Exodus	0
Leviticus	0
Numbers	1
Deuteronomy	0
Nevi'im	6
Ketuvim	9

The yerach ben yomo + karne para phrase occurs a total of 16 times according to the Leningrad Codex. They are:

- אלפים באמה Numbers 35:5
- ויהושע בן־נון Joshua 19:51
- היו בן־שאול 2 Samuel 4:2
- ואשר על־העיר 2 Kings 10:5
- הארץ הזאת Jeremiah 13:13
- ואמרו אליך Jeremiah 38:25
- ולאחזת העיר Ezekiel 48:21
- אשר־עשה המן Esther 7:9
- לאלה שמיא Ezra 6:9
- ועיניך פתוחות Nehemiah 1:6
- ינער האלהים Nehemiah 5:13
- היו לפנים Nehemiah 13:5
- ועמסים על־החמרים Nehemiah 13:15
- המשרתים את־המלך 1 Chronicles 28:1
- לערי יהודה 2 Chronicles 24:5
- לבני העם 2 Chronicles 35:7
