= Karne parah =

Hebrew cantillation mark

Karne parah
קַרְנֵי פָרָ֟ה / ֟ / לְפָנ֟ים
cantillation
Sof passuk/Sof aliyah | ׃ | Paseq | ׀
Etnakhta/atnakh | ֑ | Segol | ֒
Shalshelet | ֓ | Zakef katan | ֔
Zakef gadol | ֕ | Tifcha/tarkha | ֖
Rivia | ֗ | Zarka | ֘
Pashta | ֙ | Yetiv | ֚
Tevir | ֛ | Geresh | ֜
Geresh muqdam | ֝ | Gershayim | ֞
Karne parah | ֟ | Telisha gedola/talsha | ֠
Pazer | ֡ | Atnah hafukh | ֢
Munakh/shofar holekh | ֣ | Mahpach | ֤
Merkha/ma’arikh | ֥ | Mercha kefula | ֦
Darga | ֧ | Qadma | ֨
Telisha qetana/tarsa | ֩ | Yerah ben yomo | ֪
Ole | ֫ | Illuy | ֬
Dehi | ֭ | Tsinnorit | ֮

Karne parah (Hebrew: קַרְנֵי פָרָה, also spelled Qarnei Farah and other variant English spellings) is a cantillation mark found only once in the entire Torah (Book of Numbers Numbers] 35:5), and once in the Book of Esther, immediately following the identically unique Yerach ben yomo.

The symbol of the Karne para is that of the Telisha ketana and gedola together. The melody, likewise, is that of these two more common cantillation sounds put together.

The Hebrew words קַרְנֵי פָרָה translate into English as cow's horns.

== Purpose ==
=== A general approach ===
Dr. David Weisberg suggested that the yerach ben yomo + karne para phrase is meant to call to mind a midrash halakhah, a legal point in Jewish law determined from the verse. For instance, he claimed that the yerach ben yomo + karne para phrase of Numbers 35:5 is meant to remind the reader of the halakhah that the travel limit on Shabbat is 2,000 cubits, and the Talmud, b. Eruvin 51a derives that distance by analogy from this verse.

=== In the Torah ===
The rare trope sound in the Torah appears in Numbers 35:5 on the word B'amah (באמה, cubit), immediately following the word Alpayim (אלפים, two-thousand), on which an equally exclusive Yerach ben yomo is used, on the first of four occurrences of this phrase in the verse. In each of the phrase's four appearances, a different set of trope. The Yerach ben yomo followed by the Karne Parah is found on the first of these four instances. On the other three, respectively, are a Kadma V'Azla, a Munach Rivi'i, and a Mercha Tipcha.

This is representative of the way mitzvot are performed in real life. When one first performs a mitzvah, being a new experience, it is performed with great enthusiasm. The unusual trope signify the one-time occurrence of the mitzvah being a new experience. The second instance is on a Kadma-V'Azla, a note that is recited highly, showing that the high is still alive. The third is on a Munach-Rivi'i, a note that is going downward, showing that enthusiasm is going down. The fourth and final occurrence being on a Mercha-Tipcha, a common set that are recited in a lazy mode as if they are basically being recited without a melody, show the monotony of performing a mitzvah after performing it so many times.

Altogether, this verse shows the importance of performing a mitzvah that must be performed regularly, despite its monotony. It is an encouragement to bring new light into each time on performs a mitzvah in order to renew the excitement, and even when one cannot do so, to perform the mitzvah regardless.

=== In the Book of Esther ===
The only other time a Karne parah is read in public is in the Book of Esther, on the word Haman, at Esther 7:9. Since the Book of Esther is read twice in a year in Orthodox tradition while the part of Masei containing this trope is read just once, the reading in the Book of Esther is actually read more often.

== Total occurrences ==
| Book | Number of appearances |
|---|---|
| Torah | 1 |
| Genesis | 0 |
| Exodus | 0 |
| Leviticus | 0 |
| Numbers | 1 |
| Deuteronomy | 0 |
| Nevi'im | 3 |
| Ketuvim | 9 |

The yerach ben yomo + karne para phrase occurs a total of 16 times according to the Leningrad Codex. They are:

- אלפים באמה Numbers 35:5
- ויהושע בן–נון Joshua 19:51
- היו בן–שאול 2 Samuel 4:2
- ואשר על–העיר 2 Kings 10:5
- הארץ הזאת Jeremiah 13:13
- ואמרו אליך Jeremiah 38:25
- ולאחזת העיר Ezekiel 48:21
- אשר–עשה המן Esther 7:9
- לאלה שמיא Ezra 6:9
- ועיניך פתוחות Nehemiah 1:6
- ינער האלהים Nehemiah 5:13
- היו לפנים Nehemiah 13:5
- ועמסים על–החמרים Nehemiah 13:15
- המשרתים את–המלך 1 Chronicles 28:1
- לערי יהודה 2 Chronicles 24:5
- לבני העם 2 Chronicles 35:7

== Melody ==
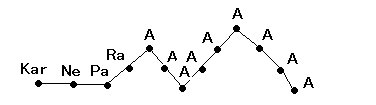
The melody is that of a Telisha ketana and gedola together, others also sing it as a mercha kefula followed by a telisha gedola, and other start with a pazer then a telisha gedola and ketana.
