= Pazer =

Hebrew cantillation

Pazer
פָּזֵ֡ר / ֡ / וַיֹּֽאמְר֡וּ
cantillation
Sof passuk	׃	Paseq	׀
Etnakhta/atnakh	֑	Segol	֒
Shalshelet	֓	Zakef katan	֔
Zakef gadol	֕	Tifcha/tarkha	֖
Rivia	֗	Zarka	֘
Pashta	֙	Yetiv	֚
Tevir	֛	Geresh	֜
Geresh muqdam	֝	Gershayim	֞
Karne parah	֟	Telisha gedola/talsha	֠
Pazer	֡	Atnah hafukh	֢
Munakh/shofar holekh	֣	Mahpach	֤
Merkha/ma’arikh	֥	Mercha kefula	֦
Darga	֧	Qadma	֨
Telisha qetana/tarsa	֩	Yerah ben yomo	֪
Ole	֫	Illuy	֬
Dehi	֭	Tsinnorit	֮

Pazer (Hebrew: פָּזֵר) is a cantillation mark found in the Torah, Haftarah, and other books of the Hebrew Bible. The pazer is generally followed by a Telisha ketana or gedola; on rare occasions, it is followed by another Pazer.

The Pazer is used to prolong a word significantly during the reading. This places strong emphasis on the meaning of the particular word.

The Hebrew word פָּזֵר translates into English as distribute or disseminate. This relates to the high number of notes in its melody. In a mystical interpretation, it shows the distribution of divinity.

== Total occurrences ==
Book	Number of appearances
Torah	154
Genesis	29
Exodus	29
Leviticus	27
Numbers	36
Deuteronomy	33
Nevi'im	177
Ketuvim	284

== Melody ==
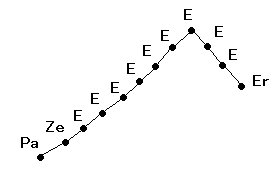
