= Zakef gadol =

Zakef gadol
זָקֵף גָּד֕וֹל / ֕ / וְלִרְא֕וֹת
cantillation
Sof passuk	׃	Paseq	׀
Etnakhta/atnakh	֑	Segol	֒
Shalshelet	֓	Zakef katan	֔
Zakef gadol	֕	Tifcha/tarkha	֖
Rivia	֗	Zarka	֘
Pashta	֙	Yetiv	֚
Tevir	֛	Geresh	֜
Geresh muqdam	֝	Gershayim	֞
Karne parah	֟	Telisha gedola/talsha	֠
Pazer	֡	Atnah hafukh	֢
Munakh/shofar holekh	֣	Mahpach	֤
Merkha/ma’arikh	֥	Mercha kefula	֦
Darga	֧	Qadma	֨
Telisha qetana/tarsa	֩	Yerah ben yomo	֪
Ole	֫	Illuy	֬
Dehi	֭	Tsinnorit	֮

Zakef Gadol (Hebrew: זָקֵף גָּדוֹל, with variant English spellings) is a cantillation mark that is commonly found in the Torah and Haftarah. It is represented by a vertical line on the left and two dots one on top of the other on the right.

The Zakef gadol is one of two versions of the Zakef trope. The other is the Zakef katan, part of the Katan group. A zakef segment, which includes either a zakef gadol or katan, will either be followed by another zakef segment or the Etnachta group, usually starting with a Mercha.

The Zakef gadol generally functions as a separator between two segments of a verse. Words that bear the zakef gadol are generally short with no preceding conjunctive. It is used in situations where a Zakef katon would be expected, but where there is only a single word.

The Hebrew word זָקֵף translates into English as upright. גָּדוֹל translates as large.

== Total occurrences ==
Book	Number of appearances
Torah	524
Genesis	175
Exodus	99
Leviticus	56
Numbers	125
Deuteronomy	69
Nevi'im	395
Ketuvim	312
