= Kadma (trope) =

Kadma
קַדְמָ֨א / ֨ / וַתֹּוצֵ֨א
cantillation
Sof passuk	׃	Paseq	׀
Etnakhta/atnakh	֑	Segol	֒
Shalshelet	֓	Zakef katan	֔
Zakef gadol	֕	Tifcha/tarkha	֖
Rivia	֗	Zarka	֘
Pashta	֙	Yetiv	֚
Tevir	֛	Geresh	֜
Geresh muqdam	֝	Gershayim	֞
Karne parah	֟	Telisha gedola/talsha	֠
Pazer	֡	Atnah hafukh	֢
Munakh/shofar holekh	֣	Mahpach	֤
Merkha/ma’arikh	֥	Mercha kefula	֦
Darga	֧	Qadma	֨
Telisha qetana/tarsa	֩	Yerah ben yomo	֪
Ole	֫	Illuy	֬
Dehi	֭	Tsinnorit	֮

Kadma (Hebrew: קַדְמָא, with variant English spellings) is a common cantillation mark found in the Torah, Haftarah, and other books of the Hebrew Bible. It can be found by itself preceding certain trope groups, or together with a Geresh, in which case, the pair is known as "Kadma-V'Azla."

Kadma has the same symbol as the Pashta, though Kadma is distinct from Pashta in the placement of the symbol. In a Kadma, the symbol is always placed on the accented syllable, while Pashta is placed on the last letter and also on the accented syllable if the last syllable is not the accented one.

The symbols for Kadma V'Azla are designed to resemble the fingers of an outstretched hand in a curved position.

The Kadma-V'Azla pair occurs 1733 times in the Torah.

The word Kadma is related to the Hebrew קדמה (kedma), east. It is also related to the root ק־ד־ם, front. The combination of these words translates to going away.

== Melody ==

=== Kadma V'Azla ===
The melody for a Kadma V'Azla is a continual string of notes without a break as follows:
