= Gershayim =

Mark used in Hebrew

Gershayim
punctuation mark	״	פַּרְדֵּ״ס
cantillation mark	֞	וּרְד֞וּ
compare with quotation marks
"פַּרְדֵּ״ס", "וּרְד֞וּ"

Gershayim (Hebrew: גֵּרְשַׁיִם, without niqqud גרשיים), also occasionally grashayim (גְּרָשַׁיִם), can refer to either of two distinct typographical marks in the Hebrew language. The name means "double geresh".

== Punctuation mark ==
Gershayim most commonly refers to the punctuation mark ⟨״⟩. It is always written before the last letter of the non-inflected form of a word or numeral. It is used in the following ways:

- To indicate Hebrew abbreviations. For example: דּוּ״חַ (singular), דּוּ״חוֹת (plural), "report" represents דין וחשבון; and מ״כ (masculine), מַ״כִּית (feminine), "squad commander" represents מפקד(ת) כיתה.
- To indicate a multi-digit Hebrew numerals. For example: י״ח represents 18.
- To indicate the names of Hebrew letters, differentiating them from any homographs. Compare הוּא שִׂרְטֵט עַיִן "he sketched an eye" with הוּא שִׂרְטֵט עַיִ״ן "he sketched an ayin".
- To indicate Hebrew word roots. For example: the root of תַּשְׁבֵּצִים/taʃbeˈtsim/ "crossword puzzles" is שב״צ (š—b—ṣ); the root of לְהַטּוֹת /lehaˈtot/ "to tilt, to conjugate" is נט״ה (n—ṭ—h); and the root of הִסְתַּנְכְּרְנוּת /histankreˈnut/ "being synchronized" is סנכר״נ (s–n–k–r–n).
- In older texts, to indicate the transliteration of a foreign word. This use corresponds to the English language's use of italic type. For example, in printed works of Rashi, the town of Rashi's birth, Troyes, is spelled טרוי״ש.

== Cantillation mark ==
Gershayim is a disjunctive cantillation accent in the Hebrew Bible: ◌֞. It is placed above the stressed syllable, as in Biblical Hebrew: וַיִּקַּ֞ח, romanized: wayyiqqáḥ, in Genesis 22:3.

== Computer encoding ==
Most keyboards do not have a key for the gershayim punctuation; as a result, a quotation mark is often substituted for it. The cantillation accent however is generally not typed, as it plays a completely different role and can occur in the middle of words (it does not mark any word separation), or marked using a different interlinear notation if needed (such as superscripts or other notational symbols).

Appearance	Code points	Name
״	U+05F4	Hebrew Punctuation Gershayim
֞	U+059E	Hebrew Accent Gershayim

== See also ==
- Hebrew alphabet
- Hebrew diacritics
- Hebrew punctuation
