= Meteg =

Hebrew punctuation mark

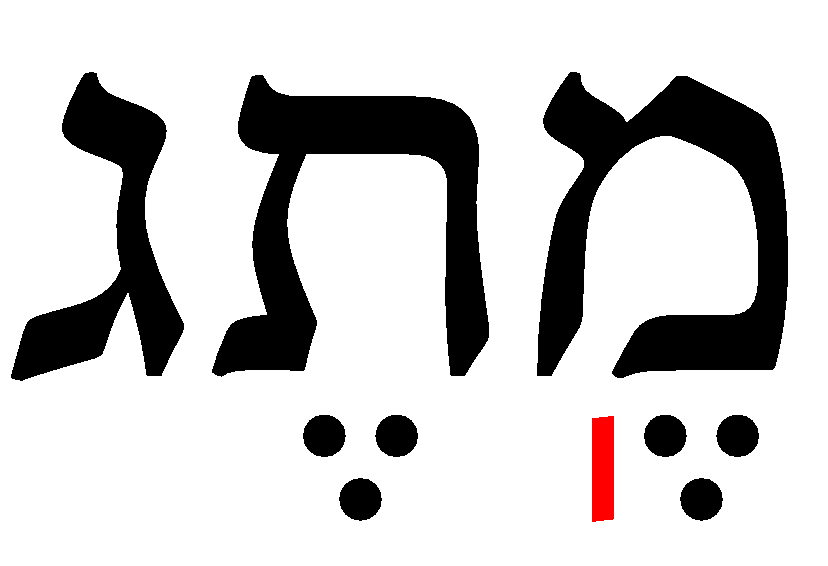
Final meteg (colored in red) occurring here to the left of the segol vowel point, below the first letter mem.

Meteg (מֶתֶג)
ֽ	אֲהֵבֽוּךָ
compare with comma
אֲהֵבֽוּךָ,

Meteg (or meseg or metheg, Hebrew: מֶתֶג, lit. 'bridle'; also גַּעְיָה, gaʿya, 'bellowing'; מַאֲרִיךְ, maʾarikh; or מַעֲמִיד, maʿamid) is a punctuation mark used in Biblical Hebrew for stress marking. It is a vertical bar placed under the affected syllable.

== Usage ==
Meteg is primarily used in Biblical Hebrew to mark secondary stress and sometimes to mark a vowel as long. While short and long vowels are largely allophonic, there are minimal pairs in which the presence or absence of meteg can make a difference: compare e.g. יִֽרְאוּ yīrəʔū 'they fear' (from the root ירא; also spelled יִירְאוּ) with יִרְאוּ yirʔū 'they see' (from the root ראי). Meteg may also serve to distinguish between qamatz gadol and qatan, e.g. שָֽׁמְרָה šāmərā 'she guarded' vs. שׇׁמְרָה šomrā 'guard!' (masculine singular volitive).

In modern usage meteg is only used in liturgical contexts and dictionaries. Siddurim and dictionaries may use meteg to mark primary stress, often only for non-final stress, since the majority of Hebrew words have final stress.

== Appearance and placement ==
Its form is a vertical bar placed either to the left, the right, or in the middle of the niqqud (diacritics for vowels or cantillation) under a consonant. It is identical in appearance to silluq (which is used only on the last word of a verse and is not omitted even for final stress) and is unified with it in Unicode.

Meteg differs from other Hebrew diacritics in that its placement is not totally fixed. While meteg is usually placed to the left of a vowel, some texts place it to the right, and some place it in the middle of hataf vowels. The Rabbinic Bible of 1524–25 always shifts meteg to the left, while the Aleppo Codex and Leningrad Codex are not consistent in meteg placement.

The different placements of meteg are subgrouped relatively to its order with surrounding vowel points occurring below letters before or after it and are summarized in the table below. Three types of metegs are generally considered, with the left meteg being the most common case for simple vowels (however there's some rare cases where this group must be subdivided according to the placement of cantillation accents), and the medial meteg occurring only (but most frequently) with (composite) hataf vowels.

Meteg placement in the Biblia Hebraica Stuttgartensia
Group	Position	Frequency	Example	Reference	Preferred encoding in logical order (recommended by SIL and Unicode)
Left (final) meteg	centered alone below (possibly after holam or holam haser vowel point, above)	common	לֵאמֹֽר׃	Exodus (20:1:6)	optional vowel points, (CGJ optional but not needed), meteg point
Left (final) meteg	after (left of) vowel point below	common	וַֽיִּמְצְא֗וּ	1 Kings (1:3:7)	optional vowel points, (CGJ optional but not needed), meteg point
Left (final) meteg	between vowel points below (the last vowel point may shift to the left below the next letter, but still reads before it; most occurrences are in the common Biblic orthography of Y_{e}RUŠ_{a}L_{a}(Y)_{i}M, where the second yod letter is implied and not written: the meteg notes the stress/length of the first vowel before this implied yod, when the second vowel is shortened/unstressed by the following vowelless mem letter)	common	יְרוּשָׁלָֽ͏ִם	2 Chronicles (14:15:9)	first vowel point, (CGJ optional but not needed), meteg point, second vowel point
Left (final) meteg	before (right of) cantillation accent	rare	לֹֽ֣א	Exodus (20:4:1)	meteg point, (CGJ optional but not needed), cantillation accent
Left (final) meteg	after (left of) hataf vowel point	rare	הֱ‌ֽיֹות־אֶֽהְיֶ֥ה	Psalms (50:21:5)	hataf vowel point, ZWNJ, meteg point
Left (final) meteg	after (left of) vowel point and cantillation accent below	occasional	נְ͏ֽ֭נַתְּקָה	Psalms (2:3:1)	optional vowel point, cantillation accent, CGJ, meteg point
Left (final) meteg	after (left of) cantillation accent	rare	עֲבָדִ͏ֽ֑ים׃	Exodus (20:2:9)	optional vowel point, cantillation accent, CGJ, meteg point
Right (initial) meteg	before vowel point, first syllable	common	תֽ͏ַעֲשֶׂ֨ה־לְךָ֥֣	Exodus (20:4:2)	meteg point, CGJ, vowel point
Right (initial) meteg	before vowel point, word-medial	rare	וְלֽ͏ַנַּעֲרָ֙	Deuteronomy (22:26:10)	meteg point, CGJ, vowel point
Right (initial) meteg	before (right of) hataf vowel point	rare	הֽ͏ֲלֹא־אַ֭תָּה	Psalms (85:7:1)	meteg point, CGJ, vowel point
Medial meteg	medial, inside hataf segol vowel point	common	אֱ‍ֽלֹהֵיכֶ֔ם	2 Chronicles (32:15:22)	hataf vowel point, ZWJ, meteg point
Medial meteg	medial, inside hataf patah vowel point	common	אֲ‍ֽשֶׁר־לַדְּבִ֖יר	1 Kings (6:22:7)	hataf vowel point, ZWJ, meteg point

Note finally that under narrow letters (such as nun) with vowel points below, or under letters that are also surrounded by multiple vowel points or cantillation accents below them, the meteg may not fit well on any side of the vowel point below the base letter. In that case the meteg may adopt an ambiguous position, below the existing vowel point or above the cantillation accent that normally fits below the base letter. Such ambiguous positioning occurs in old books like the Codex Leningradensis (around year 1006) whose text on paper was extremely compacted with minimal spacing between letters.

== Unicode ==
In Unicode, Meteg and Silluq (when it occurs before punctuation Sof passuk at end of verses) are unified.

Glyph	Unicode	Name
ֽ	U+05BD	Hebrew Point Meteg

Unicode also does not distinguish between the different placements of Meteg. And because Meteg has a distinctive combining class, its encoding order relative to other diacritics is not significant (because of canonical equivalence). Consequently, the Meteg may be freely reordered during Unicode normalization when it appears in sequences with other combining diacritics, without affecting its interpretation or rendering.

Where the relative placement of Meteg is significant and does not match the standard order of combining classes of Hebrew diacritics (where the Meteg should appear after Hebrew vowel points but before Hebrew cantillation marks in normalized texts), a combining grapheme joiner (CGJ, U+034F) should be added between Meteg and other diacritics before or after it, to fix its rendering placement and intended meaning.

In the most frequent use of Meteg, it should follow the vowel mark, but the canonical ordering of combining classes swaps them during standard normalizations: the canonical combining class of Meteg is 22, higher than the canonical combining classes 10 to 20 assigned to Hebrew vowel points; it is also higher than the canonical combining class 21 assigned to the combining Dagesh (or Mapiq) consonant modifier, but this generally causes no problem.

In the most frequent cases of use in modern Hebrew, the Meteg should only follow a vowel point and cantillation marks are not used; but in Biblical Hebrew it must sometimes be encoded with an additional CGJ after it before a vowel point, so that it remains interpreted first (and rendered to the right) before the niqqud after it (to the left); Meteg must also be preceded by a CGJ if it must appear after (to the left) a cantillation accent (whose combining class is 220 or more).

Additionally, the special placements of meteg with the three hataf vowels (whose canonical combinal classes are between 11 and 13) requires encoding it after the hataf vowel point, separated by a zero-width joiner control (ZWJ, U+200D) for the medial position (between the two parts of the hataf vowel), or by a zero-width non-joiner control (ZWNJ, U+200C) for the final position (to the left of the hataf vowel); some encoded texts use CGJ instead of ZWNJ for the later case.

The three controls CGJ, ZWJ and ZWNJ (which have canonical combining class 0) are all blocking the canonical reordering of meteg with vowels points, and only ZWJ is needed for the special placement of meteg (combining class) in the middle of an hataf vowel. But in the cases where the encoding of CGJ is optional but not needed, or for the case where ZWNJ is replaced by CGJ, the presence or absence of this CGJ control creates texts that are not visually distinctive, but they are still not canonically equivalent. This may create difficulties for plain-text search, unless it uses a conforming Unicode collation algorithm (UCA) with the appropriate tailoring for the Hebrew script, where these controls are assigned ignorable weights after the initial normalization.
