= Telisha =

Telisha (Hebrew: תְּלִישָא) is a cantillation mark found in the Torah, Haftarah, and other books of the Hebrew Bible. There are two versions of the Telisha: Telisha ketana (תְּלִישָא קְטַנָּה) and Telisha gedola (תְּלִישָא גְּדוֹלָה), the latter of which has a longer melody. The Telisha trope can occur independently or can follow a Pazer or one of several other trope sounds. The Telisha ketana must be followed by a Kadma.

The Hebrew word תְּלִישָא translates into English as detached. This is because they are never linked to the following note as a single phrase. קְטַנָּה refers to little (the shorter note) and גְדוֹלָה to great (the longer note).

The Telisha gedola can be found in the Torah 266 times. The Telisha ketana occurs 451 times.

== Total occurrences ==
Book	Telisha ketana	Telisha gedola
Torah	451	266
Genesis	92	51
Exodus	87	42
Leviticus	71	56
Numbers	88	50
Deuteronomy	113	67
Nevi'im	413	238
Ketuvim	350	335

== Melody ==
While the names "Telisha Ketana" and "Telisha Gedola" are 6 syllables each, they are usually applied to words with far fewer syllables, often just one. In one-syllable words, only the notes leading to and from the peak are included. In multiple-syllable words, the additional syllables are recited at the level of the first note leading to the peak.

=== Telisha Ketana ===
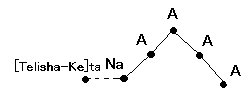

=== Telisha Gedola ===
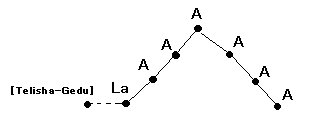
