= Windows-1255 =

Windows character set for Hebrew

- MIME / IANA: windows-1255
- Alias(es): cp1255 (Code page 1255)
- Languages: Hebrew, English
- Created by: Microsoft
- Standard: WHATWG Encoding Standard
- Classification: extended ASCII, Windows-125x
- Other related encoding: ISO-8859-8

Windows-1255 (referred to as "ANSI" especially often) is a code page used under Microsoft Windows to write Hebrew. It is an almost compatible superset of ISO-8859-8 – most of the symbols are in the same positions (except for A4, which is 'sheqel sign' in Windows-1255 but 'generic currency sign' in ISO 8859-8 and except for DF, which is undefined in Windows-1255 but 'double low line' in ISO 8859-8), but Windows-1255 adds vowel-points and other signs in lower positions.

IBM uses code page 1255 (CCSID 1255, euro sign extended CCSID 5351, and the further extended CCSID 9447) for Windows-1255.

Modern applications prefer Unicode to Windows-1255, especially on the Internet; meaning UTF-8, the dominant encoding for web pages, or UTF-16. Windows-1255 is used by less than 0.1% of websites.

== Character set ==
The following table shows Windows-1255. Each character is shown with its Unicode equivalent.

Windows-1255
	0	1	2	3	4	5	6	7	8	9	A	B	C	D	E	F
0x	NUL	SOH	STX	ETX	EOT	ENQ	ACK	BEL	BS	HT	LF	VT	FF	CR	SO	SI
1x	DLE	DC1	DC2	DC3	DC4	NAK	SYN	ETB	CAN	EM	SUB	ESC	FS	GS	RS	US
2x	SP	!	"	#	$	%	&	'	(	)	*	+	,	-	.	/
3x	0	1	2	3	4	5	6	7	8	9	:	;	<	=	>	?
4x	@	A	B	C	D	E	F	G	H	I	J	K	L	M	N	O
5x	P	Q	R	S	T	U	V	W	X	Y	Z	[	\	]		_
6x	`	a	b	c	d	e	f	g	h	i	j	k	l	m	n	o
7x	p	q	r	s	t	u	v	w	x	y	z	{	|	}	~	DEL
8x	€		‚	ƒ	„	…	†	‡	ˆ	‰		‹				
9x		‘	’	“	”	•	–	—	˜	™		›				
Ax	NBSP	¡	¢	£	₪	¥	¦	§	¨	©	×	«	¬	SHY	®	¯
Bx	°	±	²	³	´	µ	¶	·	¸	¹	÷	»	¼	½	¾	¿
Cx	ְ	ֱ	ֲ	ֳ	ִ	ֵ	ֶ	ַ	ָ	ֹ	ֺ	ֻ	ּ	ֽ	־	ֿ
Dx	׀	ׁ	ׂ	׃	װ	ױ	ײ	׳	״							
Ex	א	ב	ג	ד	ה	ו	ז	ח	ט	י	ך	כ	ל	ם	מ	ן
Fx	נ	ס	ע	ף	פ	ץ	צ	ק	ר	ש	ת			LRM	RLM	

Differences from ISO 8859-8

== Usage ==
Windows-1255 Hebrew is always in logical order (as opposed to visual). Microsoft Hebrew products (Windows, Office and Internet Explorer) brought logically-ordered Hebrew to common use, with the result that Windows-1255 is the Hebrew encoding that can be found most on the Web, having ousted the visually ordered ISO-8859-8, and preferred to the logically ordered ISO-8859-8-I because it provides for vowel-points.

== Relation to Unicode ==
The Unicode Hebrew block (U+0590–U+05FF) follows Windows-1255 by encoding both letters and vowel-points in the same relative positions as Windows-1255. Unicode goes further in encoding cantillation marks in lower positions. Unicode Hebrew is always in logical order.

For modern applications UTF-8 or UTF-16 is a preferred encoding.

== See also ==
- 7-bit Hebrew under ISO 646
- Code page 862
- ISO 8859-8
- LMBCS-3
