= ISO/IEC 8859-8 =

International standard

ISO-8859-8: Latin/Hebrew
- MIME / IANA: ISO-8859-8
- Alias(es): iso-ir-138, hebrew, csISOLatinHebrew
- Language(s): Hebrew, English
- Standard: ISO/IEC 8859-8, ECMA-121, SI 1311
- Classification: extended ASCII, ISO 8859
- Based on: DEC Hebrew (8-bit), ISO/IEC 8859-1
- Other related encoding(s): Windows-1255

ISO/IEC 8859-8, Information technology — 8-bit single-byte coded graphic character sets — Part 8: Latin/Hebrew alphabet, is part of the ISO/IEC 8859 series of ASCII-based standard character encodings. ISO/IEC 8859-8:1999 from 1999 represents its second and current revision, preceded by the first edition ISO/IEC 8859-8:1988 in 1988. It is informally referred to as Latin/Hebrew. ISO/IEC 8859-8 covers all the Hebrew letters, but no Hebrew vowel signs. IBM assigned code page 916 (CCSIDs 916 and 5012) to it. This character set was also adopted by Israeli Standard SI1311:2002, with some extensions.

ISO-8859-8 is the IANA preferred charset name for this standard when supplemented with the C0 and C1 control codes from ISO/IEC 6429. The text is (usually) in logical order, so bidi processing is required for display. Nominally ISO-8859-8 (code page 28598) is for “visual order”, and ISO-8859-8-I (code page 38598) is for logical order. But usually in practice, and required for XML documents, ISO-8859-8 also stands for logical order text. The WHATWG Encoding Standard used by HTML5 treats ISO-8859-8 and ISO-8859-8-I as distinct encodings with the same mapping due to influence on the layout direction, but notes that this no longer applies to ISO-8859-6 (Arabic), only to ISO-8859-8.

There is also ISO-8859-8-E which supposedly requires directionality to be explicitly specified with special control characters; this latter variant is in practice unused.

The Microsoft Windows code page for Hebrew, Windows-1255, is mostly an extension of ISO/IEC 8859-8 without C1 controls, except for the omission of the double underscore, and replacement of the generic currency sign (¤) with the sheqel sign (₪). It adds support for vowel points as combining characters, and some additional punctuation.

Over a decade after the publication of that standard, Unicode is preferred, at least for the Internet (meaning UTF-8, the dominant encoding for web pages). ISO-8859-8 is used by less than 0.1% of websites.

== Code page layout ==
ISO/IEC 8859-8
	0	1	2	3	4	5	6	7	8	9	A	B	C	D	E	F
0x																
1x																
2x	SP	!	"	#	$	%	&	'	(	)	*	+	,	-	.	/
3x	0	1	2	3	4	5	6	7	8	9	:	;	<	=	>	?
4x	@	A	B	C	D	E	F	G	H	I	J	K	L	M	N	O
5x	P	Q	R	S	T	U	V	W	X	Y	Z	[	\	]		_
6x	`	a	b	c	d	e	f	g	h	i	j	k	l	m	n	o
7x	p	q	r	s	t	u	v	w	x	y	z	{	|	}	~	
8x																
9x																
Ax	NBSP		¢	£	¤	¥	¦	§	¨	©	×	«	¬	SHY	®	¯
Bx	°	±	²	³	´	µ	¶	·	¸	¹	÷	»	¼	½	¾	
Cx																
Dx																‗
Ex	א	ב	ג	ד	ה	ו	ז	ח	ט	י	ך	כ	ל	ם	מ	ן
Fx	נ	ס	ע	ף	פ	ץ	צ	ק	ר	ש	ת			LRM	RLM	

Different from both DEC Hebrew (8-bit) and ISO-8859-1.

FD is left-to-right mark (U+200E) and FE is right-to-left mark (U+200F), as specified in a newer amendment as ISO/IEC 8859-8:1999.

=== 2002 Israeli Standard extensions ===
Israeli Standard SI1311:2002 matches ISO/IEC 8859-8:1999 except for a number of additional character allocations for the euro sign, new shekel sign and more advanced explicit bidirectional formatting.

SI1311:2002
	0	1	2	3	4	5	6	7	8	9	A	B	C	D	E	F
Dx										€	₪	LRO	RLO	PDF		‗
Ex	א	ב	ג	ד	ה	ו	ז	ח	ט	י	ך	כ	ל	ם	מ	ן
Fx	נ	ס	ע	ף	פ	ץ	צ	ק	ר	ש	ת	LRE	RLE	LRM	RLM	

Absent from ISO/IEC 8859-8:1999, added in SI1311:2002.

== See also ==
- 8-bit DEC Hebrew (similar DEC code page)
- Code page 1255 (similar Windows code page)
- SI 960
- 7-bit DEC Hebrew
