= DEC Hebrew =

8-bit character set supporting the Hebrew alphabet

DEC Hebrew (8-bit)
- Created by: DEC
- Classification: Extended ASCII
- Based on: DEC MCS
- Transforms / Encodes: SI 960
- Succeeded by: ISO/IEC 8859-8

The DEC Hebrew character set is an 8-bit character set developed by Digital Equipment Corporation (DEC) to support the Hebrew alphabet. It was derived from DEC's Multinational Character Set (MCS) by removing the existing definitions from code points 192 to 223 and 224 to 250 and replacing code points 251 to 256 by the Hebrew letters. This range corresponds to the Hebrew range of its 7-bit counterpart, but with the high bit set.

Since MCS is a predecessor of ISO/IEC 8859-1, DEC Hebrew is similar to ISO/IEC 8859-8 and the Windows code page 1255, that is, many characters in the range 160 to 191 are the same, and the Hebrew letters are at 192 to 250 in all three character sets.

== Code page layout ==
DEC Hebrew (8-bit)
	0	1	2	3	4	5	6	7	8	9	A	B	C	D	E	F
0x	NUL	SOH	STX	ETX	EOT	ENQ	ACK	BEL	BS	HT	LF	VT	FF	CR	SO	SI
1x	DLE	DC1	DC2	DC3	DC4	NAK	SYN	ETB	CAN	EM	SUB	ESC	FS	GS	RS	US
2x	SP	!	"	#	$	%	&	'	(	)	*	+	,	-	.	/
3x	0	1	2	3	4	5	6	7	8	9	:	;	<	=	>	?
4x	@	A	B	C	D	E	F	G	H	I	J	K	L	M	N	O
5x	P	Q	R	S	T	U	V	W	X	Y	Z	[	\	]		_
6x	`	a	b	c	d	e	f	g	h	i	j	k	l	m	n	o
7x	p	q	r	s	t	u	v	w	x	y	z	{	|	}	~	DEL
8x					IND	NEL	SSA	ESA	HTS	HTJ	VTS	PLD	PLU	RI	SS2	SS3
9x	DCS	PU1	PU2	STS	CCH	MW	SPA	EPA				CSI	ST	OSC	PM	APC
Ax		¡	¢	£		¥		§	¤	©	ª	«				
Bx	°	±	²	³		µ	¶	·		¹	º	»	¼	½		¿
Cx																
Dx																
Ex	א	ב	ג	ד	ה	ו	ז	ח	ט	י	ך	כ	ל	ם	מ	ן
Fx	נ	ס	ע	ף	פ	ץ	צ	ק	ר	ש	ת					

Differences from ISO-8859-8

== See also ==
- 8-bit DEC Greek (Code page 1287)
- 8-bit DEC Turkish (Code page 1288)
- 8-bit DEC Cyrillic (KOI-8 Cyrillic)
- 7-bit DEC Hebrew (SI 960)
