= SI 960 =

DEC and Israeli Standard 7-bit character encoding for Hebrew

- Kermit: hebrew-7
- Alias(es): DEC Hebrew (7-bit)
- Created by: DEC
- Standard: SI 960
- Classification: 7-bit encoding, non-Latin adaptation of ISO 646 with naturally ordered letters
- Based on: ASCII
- Succeeded by: DEC: DEC Hebrew (8-bit), SII: SI 1311

The Israeli Standards Institute's Standard SI 960 defines a 7–bit Hebrew code page. It is derived from, but does not conform to, ISO/IEC 646; more specifically, it follows ASCII except for the lowercase letters and backtick (`), which are replaced by the naturally ordered Hebrew alphabet. It is also known as DEC Hebrew (7–bit), because DEC standardized this character set before it became an international standard. Kermit named it hebrew–7 and HEBREW–7.

The Hebrew alphabet is mapped to positions 0x60–0x7A, on top of the lowercase Latin letters (and grave accent for aleph). 7–bit Hebrew is stored in visual order.

This mapping with the high bit set, i.e. with the Hebrew letters in 0xE0–0xFA, is also reflected in ISO 8859-8.

== Code page layout ==
SI 960
| | 0 | 1 | 2 | 3 | 4 | 5 | 6 | 7 | 8 | 9 | A | B | C | D | E | F |
|---|---|---|---|---|---|---|---|---|---|---|---|---|---|---|---|---|
| 0x | NUL | SOH | STX | ETX | EOT | ENQ | ACK | BEL | BS | HT | LF | VT | FF | CR | SO | SI |
| 1x | DLE | DC1 | DC2 | DC3 | DC4 | NAK | SYN | ETB | CAN | EM | SUB | ESC | FS | GS | RS | US |
| 2x | SP | ! | " | # | $ | % | & | ' | ( | ) | * | + | , | - | . | / |
| 3x | 0 | 1 | 2 | 3 | 4 | 5 | 6 | 7 | 8 | 9 | : | ; | < | = | > | ? |
| 4x | @ | A | B | C | D | E | F | G | H | I | J | K | L | M | N | O |
| 5x | P | Q | R | S | T | U | V | W | X | Y | Z | [ | \ | ] | | _ |
| 6x | א | ב | ג | ד | ה | ו | ז | ח | ט | י | ך | כ | ל | ם | מ | ן |
| 7x | נ | ס | ע | ף | פ | ץ | צ | ק | ר | ש | ת | { | | | } | ~ | |

== See also ==
- ISO/IEC 646
- DEC National Replacement Character Set (NRCS)
- SI 1311
