= 8I =

8I or 8-I can refer to:

== Transportation ==
- MyAir (former IATA code: 8I), a 2004–2009 Italian low-cost airline
- Itapemirim Transportes Aéreos (2020–2022) (former IATA code: 8I), a former Brazilian airline
- 747-8i, a model of Boeing 747

== Computing ==
- PowerXCell 8i, IBM model of Cell microprocessor
- ISO-8859-8-I, an IANA charset name

== Other uses ==
- 8i (virtual reality), a New Zealand-based virtual reality company

== See also ==
- SBB-CFF-FFS Ce 6/8 I
- I8 (disambiguation)
