= Hebrew keyboard =

Keyboard layout

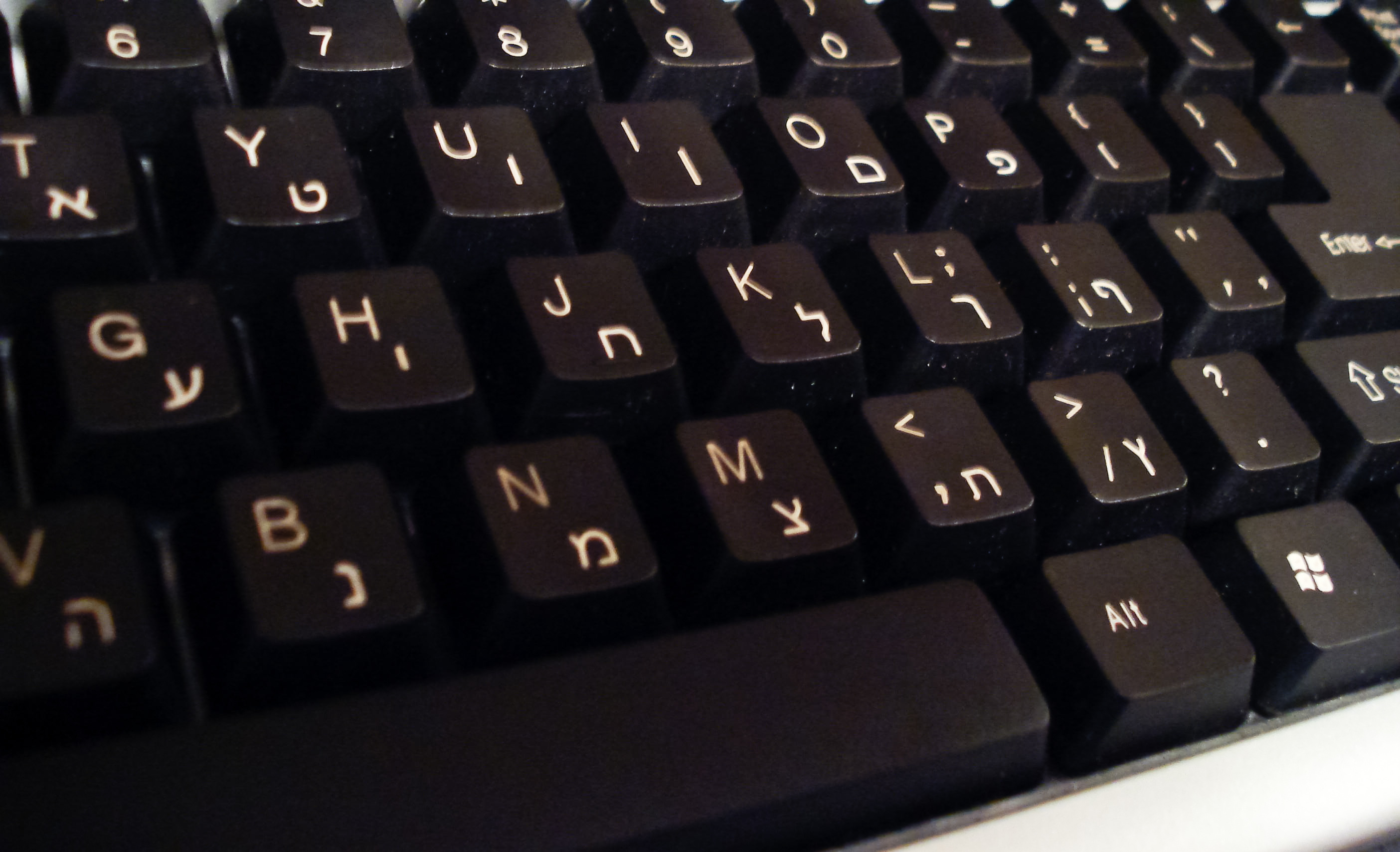
A standard Hebrew keyboard showing both Hebrew and Latin letters

A Hebrew keyboard (Hebrew: מקלדת עברית, romanized: mikledet ivrit) comes in two different keyboard layouts. Most Hebrew keyboards are bilingual, with Latin characters, usually in a U.S. QWERTY layout.

== Layouts ==
=== Standard Hebrew keyboard ===
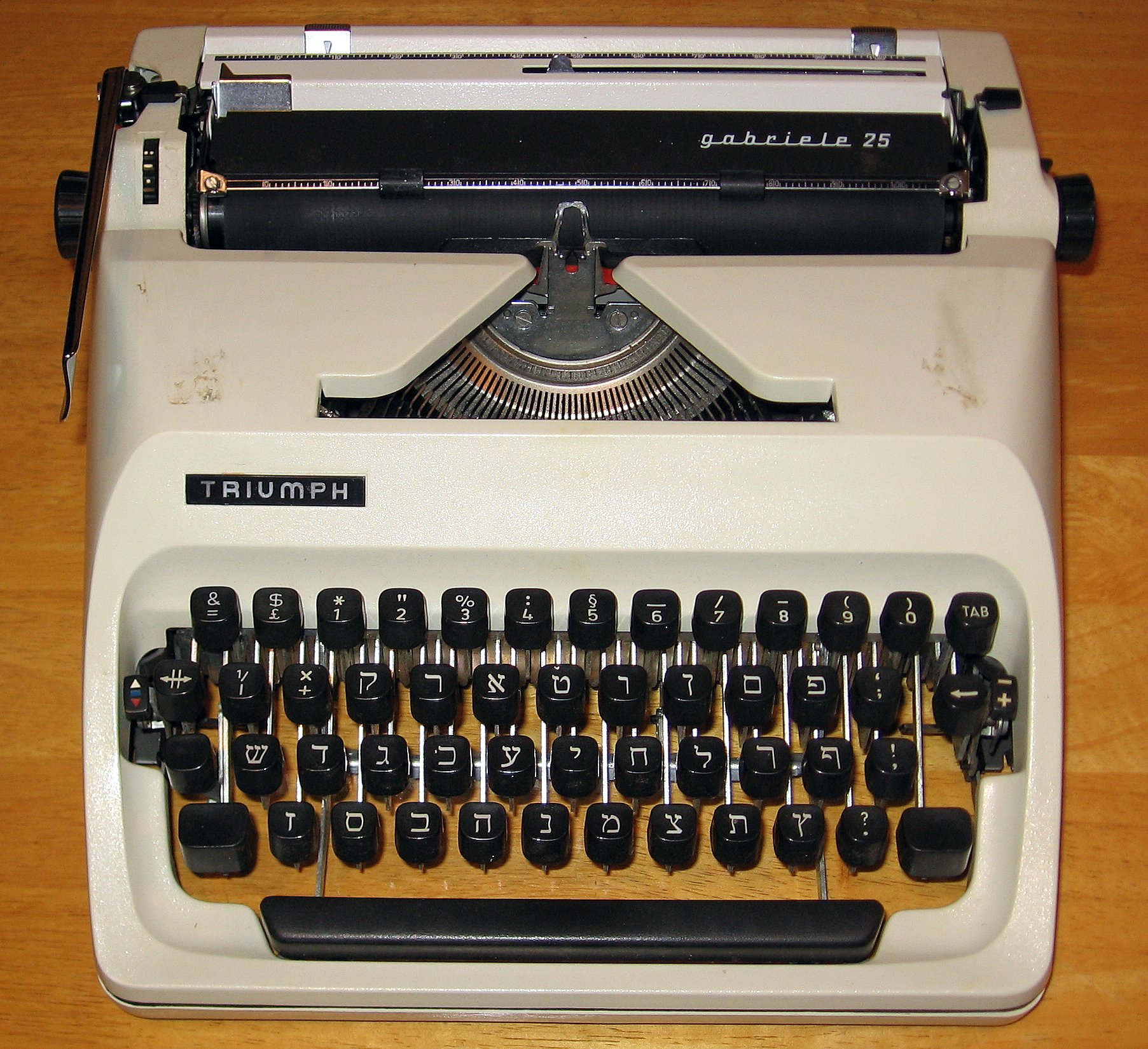
A typewriter in the Hebrew layout, the Triumph Gabriele 25.

Standard Hebrew keyboards have a 101/104-key layout. Like the standard English keyboard layout, QWERTY, the Hebrew layout was derived from the order of letters on Hebrew typewriters. The layout is codified in SI-1452 by SII. The latest revision, from 2013, mostly modified the location of the diacritics points and punctuation such as quotation marks and geresh.

One noteworthy feature is that in the standard layout, paired delimiters—parentheses (), brackets [], braces {}, and angle brackets (less/greater than) <>—have the opposite logical representation from the standard in left-to-right languages. This gets flipped again by the rendering engine's BiDi mirroring algorithm, resulting in the same visual representation as in Latin keyboards. Key mappings follow the logical rather than the physical representation. For instance, whether on a right-to-left or left-to-right keyboard, Shift-9 always produces a logical "open parenthesis". On a right-to-left keyboard, this is written as the Unicode character U+0029, "right parenthesis": ). This is true on Arabic keyboards as well. On a left-to-right keyboard, this is written as the Unicode character U+0028, "left parenthesis": (.

In a 102/105-key layout of this form, there would be an additional key to the right of the left shift key. This would be an additional backslash key. Keyboards with 102 keys are not sold as standard, except by certain manufacturers which have elected to sell European-style 102-key Hebrew keyboards, such as Logitech and Apple).

On computers running Windows, Alt-Shift switches between keyboard layouts. Holding down a Shift key (or pressing Caps Lock) in Windows produces the uppercase Latin letter without the need to switch layouts.

Hebrew keyboard

==== SI-1452-2 Improved Mapping ====
In 2018, SII published the SI-1452-2 "Improved Mapping" standard. This layout is also known as arkn (Hebrew: ארקן) after the four consecutive keys in the top left of the keyboard.

It is mostly identical to the SI-1452 layout, with the following changes:

- The punctuation marks period (.), comma (,), apostrophe (') and forward slash (/) have been moved to the same position as on a QWERTY keyboard.
  - Note: semicolon (;) remains in place.
- ת takes ן's place in order to move the latter away from ו, to which its proximity sometimes causes confusion.
- ץ and ן were moved to the top left part of the keyboard.
- All Niqqud marks moved to their Lyx-style layout, even on systems where this isn't supported with the SI-1452 layout (such as macOS).
- The rafe diacritic (◌ֿ) and two cantillation marks, meteg (◌ֽ) and ole (◌֫), were added.
- True Hebrew gershayim (״), quotes („”) and maqaf (־) were added.
- RLM and LRM characters added on all systems.
- Multiplication (×) and division (÷) signs were added.

The improved mapping is provided by X Keyboard Config since August 2023, but as of November 2023 has no support on MacOS. Users whose system doesn't provide the mapping are able to download it from mikladot.com.

=== Hebrew on standard Latin-based keyboards ===
There are a variety of layouts that, for the most part, follow the phonology of the letters on a Latin-character keyboard such as the QWERTY or AZERTY. Where no phonology mapping is possible, or where multiple Hebrew letters map to a single Latin letter, a similarity in shape or other characteristic may be chosen. For instance, if ס (samech) is assigned to S, ש (shin/sin) may be assigned to W, which it arguably resembles. The shift key is often used to access the five Hebrew letters that have final forms (sofit) used at the end of words.

These layouts are commonly known as "Hebrew-QWERTY" or "French AZERTY-Hebrew" layouts. While Hebrew layouts for Latin-based keyboards are not well standardized, macOS comes with a Hebrew-QWERTY variant, and software layouts for Microsoft Windows can be found on the Internet. Tools such as the Microsoft Keyboard Layout Creator can also be used to produce custom layouts.

While uncommon, manufacturers are beginning to produce Hebrew-QWERTY stickers and printed keyboards, useful for those who do not wish to memorize the positions of the Hebrew characters.

== Niqqud ==
=== History ===
SI-1452 in its pre-2013 version made an error in the definition. Originally, it tried to assign niqqud to the upper row of the keyboard. Due to an ambiguity in the standard's language, however, anyone reasonably reading the standard would conclude that pressing shift+the upper row keys would produce both Niqqud and the standard signs available in the US keyboard.

Faced with this ambiguity, most manufacturers developed a de facto standard where pressing Shift+upper row key produces the same result as with the US mapping (except the reversal of the open and close brackets). Niqqud was delegated to a more complicated process. Typically, that would be pressing the caps-lock, and then using shift+the keys. This combination was obscure enough, in combination with the relative rare use of Niqqud in modern Hebrew, that most people did not even know of its existence. Even those who did know, would rarely memorize the quite arbitrary locations of the specific marks.

Most people who needed it would use virtual graphical keyboards available on the World Wide Web, or by methods integrated into particular operating systems.

The 2013 revision of SI-1452 sought out to rectify both of those problems. For compatibility reasons, it was decided to not touch the first two shifting layers of the layout (i.e. - no shift keys at all and the shift key pressed). Niqqud and other marks were added mostly to layer 3, with AltGr pressed.

Niqqud input
Input (Windows)	Key (Windows)	Input (Mac OS X)	Unicode	Type	Result
~		0	05B0	Sh'va	^{[1]}
1		3	05B1	Reduced Segol	^{[1]}
2		1	05B2	Reduced Patach	^{[1]}
3		2	05B3	Reduced Qamatz	^{[1]}
4		4	05B4	Hiriq	^{[1]}
5		5	05B5	Zeire	^{[1]}
6		9	05B6	Segol	^{[1]}
7		6	05B7	Patach	^{[1]}

Niqqud input
Input (Windows)	Key (Windows)	Input (Mac OS X)	Unicode	Type	Result
8		7	05B8	Kamatz	^{[1]}
–		w	05C7	Kamatz Katan	^{[1]}
9		A	05C2	Sin dot (left)	^{[2]}
0		M	05C1	Shin dot (right)	^{[2]}
–		=	05B9	Holam	^{[1]}
= ^{[3]}		,	05BC	Dagesh or Mappiq	^{[1]}
= ^{[3]}		U	05BC	Shuruk	^{[4]}
\		8	05BB	Kubutz	^{[1]}

Notes:

- ^{[1]} The letter "ס" represents any Hebrew consonant.
- ^{[2]} For sin-dot and shin-dot, the letter "ש" (sin/shin) is used.
- ^{[3]} The dagesh, mappiq, and shuruk have different uses, but the same graphical representation, and hence are input in the same manner.
- ^{[4]} For shuruk, the letter "ו" (vav) is used since it can only be used with that letter.
- A rafe can be input by inserting the corresponding Unicode character, either explicitly or via a customized keyboard layout.

SIL International have developed another standard, which is based on Tiro, but adds the Niqqud along the home keys. Linux comes with "Israel - Biblical Hebrew (Tiro)" as a standard layout. With this layout, niqqud can be typed without pressing the Caps Lock key.

=== Current Layout ===
Niqqud	AltGr + Hebrew-keyboard key	Explanation (usually the first Hebrew letter of the niqqud's name)
אָ	AltGr+ק for קָמץ (kamatz)	first Hebrew letter of the niqqud's name
אַ	AltGr+פ for פַתח (patach)	
בְ	AltGr+ש for שְׁווא (sheva)	
בּ וּ הּ	AltGr+ד for דּגש (dagesh)	
אִ	AltGr+ח for חִירִיק (hiriq)	
אֶ	AltGr+ס for סֶגול (segol)	
אֵ	AltGr+צ for צֵירֵי (tsere)	
אֹ	AltGr+ו for חׂולם (holam)	ו (like the 'o' vowel), since ח is already used for hiriq
אֻ	AltGr+\ for קֻבּוּץ (kubuts)	because the line \ visually resembles ֻ
אֲ	AltGr+] for reduced patach פַתח	the key to the right of פ
אֳ	AltGr+ר for reduced kamats קָמץ	the key to the right of ק
אֱ	AltGr+ב for reduced segol סֶגול	the key to the right of ס
שׁ	AltGr+W for the Shin dot	the key above ש, right-side, since the dot is placed above ש, right-side
שׂ	AltGr+Q for the Sin dot	the key above ש, left-side, since the dot is placed above ש, left-side
אֿ	AltGr+[ for רפֿה (rafe)	
א־א	AltGr+- (minus) for ־ (maqaf)	
א״א	AltGr+" (quotes) for ״ (gershayim)	
א׳	AltGr+; (semicolon) for ׳ (geresh)	

The new layout (SI-1452, 2013 revision) was influenced by the Linux Lyx layout, that uses the first letter of the Niqqud mark name as the position for the mark. Letters where collisions happened were decided based on frequency of use, and were located in places that should still be memorable. For example, the Holam mark conflicted with Hirik, so it was placed on the Vav letter, where Holam is usually placed in Hebrew. Likewise, the Qubutz mark, which looks like three diagonal points, conflicted with the much more useful Qamatz mark, so it was placed on the backslash key, that bears visual resemblance to it.

The new revision also introduced some symbols that were deemed useful. For example, it introduced that LRM and RLM invisible control characters (placed on the right and left brackets) to allow better formatting of complex BiDi text.

Windows supports SI-1452 since Windows 8, which was actually shipped prior to the standard's acceptance. This is due to Microsoft's membership of the SI committee. Their implementation was based on one of the final drafts, but that draft ended up almost identical to the final standard.

Linux switched to using SI-1452 once it was released, and in the process deprecated the Lyx layout, which no longer offered any added value.

== Directionality ==
Since Hebrew is read and written right-to-left, as opposed to left-to-right as in English, the cursor keys and delete keys work backwards when Hebrew text is entered in left-to-right directionality mode. Because of the differences between left-to-right and right-to-left, some difficulties arise in punctuation marks that are common between the two languages, such as periods and commas. When using standard left-to-right input, pressing the "period" key at the end of a sentence displays the mark on the wrong side of the sentence. However, when the next sentence is started, the period moves to the correct location. This is due to the operating system defaulting to its standard text directionality when a typed character (such as a punctuation mark) does not have a specified directionality.

There are several ways to force right-to left directionality. When typing, a Unicode right-to-left mark can be inserted where necessary (such as after a punctuation mark). In Notepad, or any Windows standard text box, it can be done with from the context menu Insert Unicode control character. With Windows Hebrew keyboard, RLM can be generated pressing Ctrl+]. In Microsoft Word, the Format -> Paragraph menu can be used to change the paragraph's default direction to right-to-left. Similar setting is available in Gmail composer.

There are also ways to choose the way the text is displayed, without changing the text itself. In Internet Explorer, right-to-left display can be forced by right-clicking a webpage and selecting Encoding -> Right-To-Left Document. In Notepad, or any Windows standard text box, directionality can be changed by right-clicking and selecting Right to left Reading order. Same effect can be achieved by pressing ⇧ Shift+Right Ctrl. You can switch back to Left to right Reading order by unselecting the check box or pressing ⇧ Shift+Left Ctrl. Note that this only effects presentation of the text. Next time you open the same text in Notepad, you will need to perform the same direction switch again.

== Access through the Ctrl key ==
=== Direction marks ===
As described above, the Hebrew keyboard setting in Microsoft Windows has a Ctrl+] shortcut to insert the Unicode right-to-left mark. The same effect can be achieved with Ctrl+⇧ Shift+4. The shortcuts for left-to-right mark are Ctrl+[ and Ctrl+⇧ Shift+3.

=== Separators ===
The shortcut for the 'Unit Separator' control code 1F (caret notation ^_) is Ctrl+-. The shortcut for 'Record Separator' control code 1E (caret notation ^^) is Ctrl+6. Note that in Notepad, or any Windows standard text box, these characters can be easily inserted via the context menu Insert Unicode control character. For Linux, Ubuntu, Debian and ChromeOS, the sequence is Ctrl+⇧ Shift+u followed by the control code value, then space or return.

⇧ Shift+Right Ctrl

== Access through the AltGr key ==
=== Sheqel symbol ===
The symbol "₪", which represents the sheqel sign, can be typed into Windows, Linux and ChromeOS with the Hebrew keyboard layout set, using AltGr+4. On Mac OS X, it can be typed as ⇧ Shift+7. If a US or EU layout is in use, the sequence is Alt+20AA for some Windows applications and Ctrl+⇧ Shift+u 20AAspace on Unix heritage systems.

=== Euro symbol ===
For a Euro sign, one would press the AltGr+E (ק).

=== Rafe ===
The rafe is a niqqud that is essentially no longer used in Hebrew. However, it used in Yiddish spelling (according to YIVO standards). It is accessed differently from other nequddot. On macOS, the rafe is input by pressing the desired letter (ב or פ and then the backslash \: בֿ, פֿ. On Windows, the rafe is input by pressing the AltGr key and the "-" key:

Niqqud Input
OS	Input	Key	Type	Result
Windows	AltGr+-	AltGr +	Rafe	סֿ
macOS	פ	\	Rafe	סֿ

Note: The letter "O" represents whatever Hebrew letter is used.

=== Yiddish digraphs ===
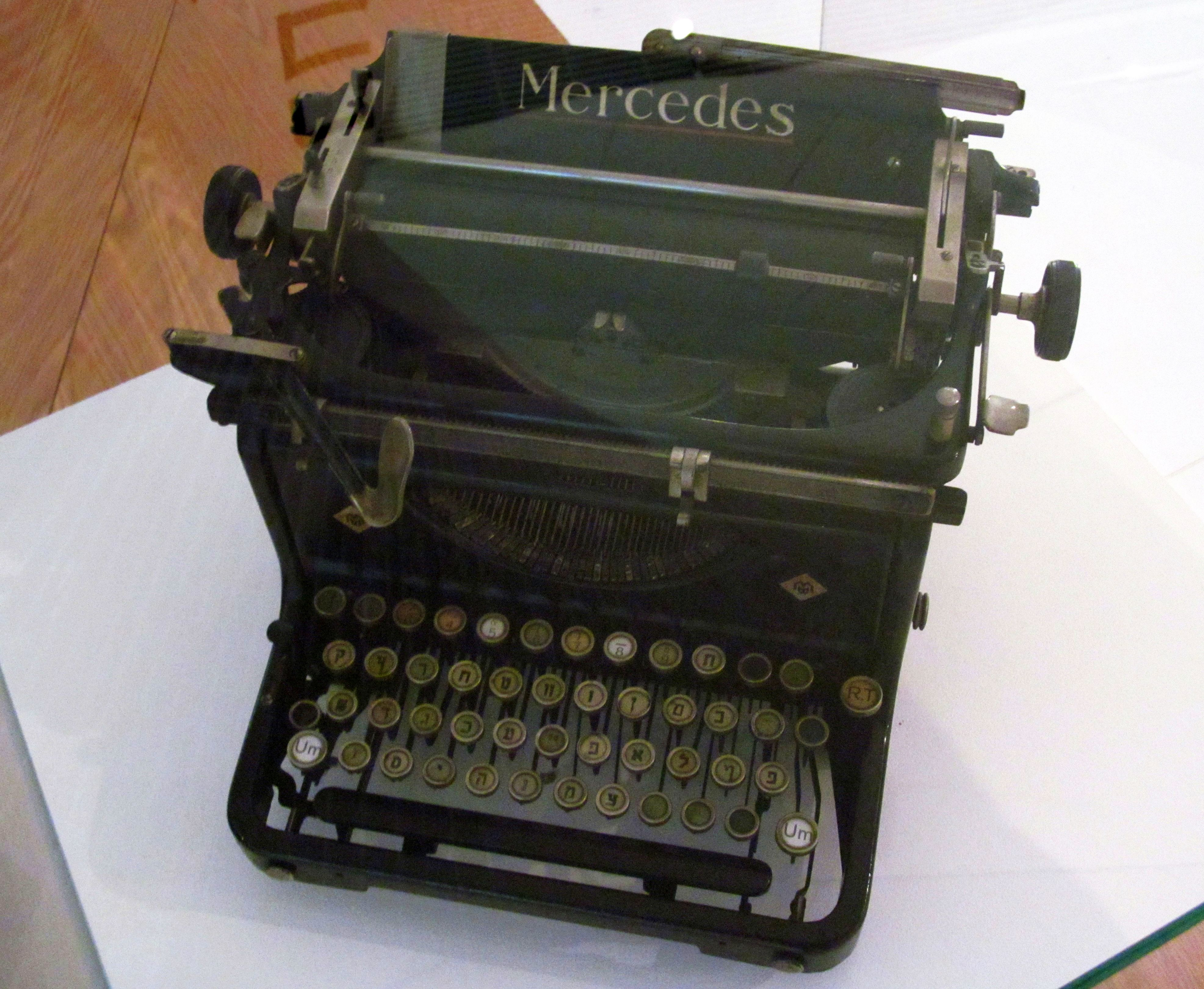
Yiddish typewriters had a layout slightly different from Hebrew, to include the digraphs

These Yiddish digraphs are not used in Hebrew; if one wanted two vavs, a vav-yud, or two yuds in Hebrew, one would enter the desired keys independently.

Yiddish digraphs Input
Input	Digraph	Result
AltGr and Vav (U)	Double Vav	װ
AltGr and Khet (J)	Vav Yud	ױ
AltGr and Yud (H)	Double Yud	ײ

== Inaccessible punctuation ==
Certain Hebrew punctuation, such as the geresh, gershayim, maqaf, pesiq, sof pasuq, and cantillation marks, are not accessible through the standard Hebrew keyboard layout. As a result, similar looking punctuation is often used instead. For example, a quotation mark is often used for a gershayim, an apostrophe for a geresh, a hyphen for a maqaf, a comma for a pesiq, and a colon for a sof pasuq, though this depends on the platform. On iOS devices, the geresh and gershayim are actually part of the system keyboard, albeit as substitutes for the apostrophe and quotation marks.

== See also ==
- Hebrew punctuation
- Keyboard layout
- Hebrew alphabet
