= Code page 1287 =

Computer character set for Greek

Code page 1287 (CCSID 1287), also known as CP1287, DEC Greek (8-bit) and EL8DEC, is one of the code pages implemented for the VT220 terminals. It supports the Greek language.

== Code page layout ==
Code page 1287
	0	1	2	3	4	5	6	7	8	9	A	B	C	D	E	F
0x	NUL	SOH	STX	ETX	EOT	ENQ	ACK	BEL	BS	HT	LF	VT	FF	CR	SO	SI
1x	DLE	DC1	DC2	DC3	DC4	NAK	SYN	ETB	CAN	EM	SUB	ESC	FS	GS	RS	US
2x	SP	!	"	#	$	%	&	'	(	)	*	+	,	-	.	/
3x	0	1	2	3	4	5	6	7	8	9	:	;	<	=	>	?
4x	@	A	B	C	D	E	F	G	H	I	J	K	L	M	N	O
5x	P	Q	R	S	T	U	V	W	X	Y	Z	[	\	]		_
6x	`	a	b	c	d	e	f	g	h	i	j	k	l	m	n	o
7x	p	q	r	s	t	u	v	w	x	y	z	{	|	}	~	DEL
8x					IND	NEL	SSA	ESA	HTS	HTJ	VTS	PLD	PLU	RI	SS2	SS3
9x	DCS	PU1	PU2	STS	CCH	MW	SPA	EPA				CSI	ST	OSC	PM	APC
Ax	NBSP	¡	¢	£		¥		§	¤	©	ª	«				
Bx	°	±	²	³		µ	¶	·		¹	º	»	¼	½		¿
Cx	ϊ	Α	Β	Γ	Δ	Ε	Ζ	Η	Θ	Ι	Κ	Λ	Μ	Ν	Ξ	Ο
Dx		Π	Ρ	Σ	Τ	Υ	Φ	Χ	Ψ	Ω	ά	έ	ή	ί		ό
Ex	ϋ	α	β	γ	δ	ε	ζ	η	θ	ι	κ	λ	μ	ν	ξ	ο
Fx		π	ρ	σ	τ	υ	φ	χ	ψ	ω	ς	ύ	ώ	΄		
Replaced with €?

== See also ==
- DEC Multinational Character Set (MCS)
- 8-bit DEC Turkish (Code page 1288)
- 8-bit DEC Hebrew
- 8-bit DEC Cyrillic (KOI-8 Cyrillic)
- 7-bit DEC Greek
