= Code page 1288 =

Computer character set for Turkish

Code page 1288 (CCSID 1288), also known as CP1288, DEC Turkish (8-bit) and TR8DEC, is one of the code pages implemented for the VT220 terminals. It supports the Turkish language.

== Code page layout ==
Code page 1288
	0	1	2	3	4	5	6	7	8	9	A	B	C	D	E	F
0x	NUL	SOH	STX	ETX	EOT	ENQ	ACK	BEL	BS	HT	LF	VT	FF	CR	SO	SI
1x	DLE	DC1	DC2	DC3	DC4	NAK	SYN	ETB	CAN	EM	SUB	ESC	FS	GS	RS	US
2x	SP	!	"	#	$	%	&	'	(	)	*	+	,	-	.	/
3x	0	1	2	3	4	5	6	7	8	9	:	;	<	=	>	?
4x	@	A	B	C	D	E	F	G	H	I	J	K	L	M	N	O
5x	P	Q	R	S	T	U	V	W	X	Y	Z	[	\	]		_
6x	`	a	b	c	d	e	f	g	h	i	j	k	l	m	n	o
7x	p	q	r	s	t	u	v	w	x	y	z	{	|	}	~	DEL
8x					IND	NEL	SSA	ESA	HTS	HTJ	VTS	PLD	PLU	RI	SS2	SS3
9x	DCS	PU1	PU2	STS	CCH	MW	SPA	EPA				CSI	ST	OSC	PM	APC
Ax	NBSP	¡	¢	£		¥		§	¤	©	ª	«			İ	
Bx	°	±	²	³		µ	¶	·		¹	º	»	¼	½	ı	¿
Cx	À	Á	Â	Ã	Ä	Å	Æ	Ç	È	É	Ê	Ë	Ì	Í	Î	Ï
Dx	Ğ	Ñ	Ò	Ó	Ô	Õ	Ö	Œ	Ø	Ù	Ú	Û	Ü	Ÿ	Ş	ß
Ex	à	á	â	ã	ä	å	æ	ç	è	é	ê	ë	ì	í	î	ï
Fx	ğ	ñ	ò	ó	ô	õ	ö	œ	ø	ù	ú	û	ü	ÿ	ş	
Differences from ISO/IEC 8859-1

== See also ==
- DEC Multinational Character Set (MCS)
- 8-bit DEC Greek (Code page 1287)
- 8-bit DEC Hebrew
- 8-bit DEC Cyrillic (KOI-8 Cyrillic)
- 7-bit DEC Turkish (TR7DEC)
