= Alphabetic Presentation Forms =

Unicode character block

- Range: U+FB00..U+FB4F (80 code points)
- Plane: BMP
- Scripts: Armenian (5 char.); Hebrew (46 char.); Latin (7 char.)
- Assigned: 58 code points
- Unused: 22 reserved code points

Unicode Version History
- 1.0.1 (1992): 1 (+1)
- 1.1 (1993): 57 (+56)
- 3.0 (1999): 58 (+1)

Unicode documentation
- Code chart ∣ Web page
- Note: Range was initially part of the Private Use Area in Unicode 1.0.0, and removed from it in Unicode 1.0.1. One character was moved from the Hebrew block to the Alphabetic Presentation Forms block in version 1.0.1 during the process of unifying with ISO 10646.

Alphabetic Presentation Forms is a Unicode block containing standard ligatures for the Latin, Armenian, and Hebrew scripts.

== Block ==
Alphabetic Presentation Forms^{[1]}^{[2]} Official Unicode Consortium code chart (PDF)
	0	1	2	3	4	5	6	7	8	9	A	B	C	D	E	F
U+FB0x	ﬀ	ﬁ	ﬂ	ﬃ	ﬄ	ﬅ	ﬆ									
U+FB1x				ﬓ	ﬔ	ﬕ	ﬖ	ﬗ						יִ	ﬞ	ײַ
U+FB2x	ﬠ	ﬡ	ﬢ	ﬣ	ﬤ	ﬥ	ﬦ	ﬧ	ﬨ	﬩	שׁ	שׂ	שּׁ	שּׂ	אַ	אָ
U+FB3x	אּ	בּ	גּ	דּ	הּ	וּ	זּ		טּ	יּ	ךּ	כּ	לּ		מּ	
U+FB4x	נּ	סּ		ףּ	פּ		צּ	קּ	רּ	שּ	תּ	וֹ	בֿ	כֿ	פֿ	ﭏ
Notes 1.As of Unicode version 17.0 2.Grey areas indicate non-assigned code points

== History ==
The following Unicode-related documents record the purpose and process of defining specific characters in the Alphabetic Presentation Forms block:

Version	Final code points (Note: Proposed code points and characters names may differ from final code points and names)	Count	UTC ID	L2 ID	WG2 ID	Document
1.0.1	U+FB1E	1				(to be determined)
1.1	U+FB00..FB06, FB13..FB17, FB1F..FB36, FB38..FB3C, FB3E, FB40..FB41, FB43..FB44, FB46..FB4F	56				(to be determined)
3.0	U+FB1D	1		X3L2/95-124	N1364	David, Mark (1995-09-29), Proposal for Inclusion of One Additional Character, HEBREW LETTER YOD WITH HIRIQ, in the Unicode/ISO 10646 Standard
3.0	U+FB1D	1	UTC/1995-054			"Additional Yiddish Letter", Unicode Technical Committee Meeting #66, Draft Minutes, 1995-09-29
3.0	U+FB1D	1			N1353	Umamaheswaran, V. S.; Ksar, Mike (1996-06-25), "8.13", Draft minutes of WG2 Copenhagen Meeting # 30
3.0	U+FB1D	1		L2/98-004R	N1681	Text of ISO 10646 – AMD 18 for PDAM registration and FPDAM ballot, 1997-12-22
3.0	U+FB1D	1		L2/98-318	N1894	Revised text of 10646-1/FPDAM 18, AMENDMENT 18: Symbols and Others, 1998-10-22
3.0	U+FB1D	1		L2/01-004		Duerst, Martin (2000-12-20), The impact of normalization (proposal to add U+FB1D to the Composition Exclusion list)
3.0	U+FB1D	1		L2/01-008		Constable, Peter (2000-12-22), Argument to add U+FB1D to the Composition Exclusion list
3.0	U+FB1D	1		L2/01-038		Rosenne, Jonathan (2001-01-18), Add U+FB1D to the Composition Exclusion List
3.0	U+FB1D	1		L2/01-012R		Moore, Lisa (2001-05-21), "Normalization - YOD WITH HIRIQ", Minutes UTC #86 in Mountain View, Jan 2001

== See also ==
- Armenian (Unicode block)
- Latin alphabet in Unicode
- Hebrew alphabet in Unicode
- Precomposed character
- Arabic Presentation Forms-A
- Arabic Presentation Forms-B
