= Unicode and HTML for the Hebrew alphabet =

Unicode and HTML values for the Hebrew script

The Unicode and HTML for the Hebrew alphabet are found in the following tables. The Unicode Hebrew block extends from U+0590 to U+05FF and from U+FB1D to U+FB4F. It includes letters, ligatures, combining diacritical marks (niqqud and cantillation marks) and punctuation. The Numeric Character References are included for HTML. These can be used in many markup languages, and they are often used on web pages to create the Hebrew glyphs presentable by the majority of web browsers.

== Unicode ==
=== Character table ===
Code	Result	Description
U+05BE	־	Hebrew Punctuation Maqaf
U+05C0	׀	Hebrew Punctuation Paseq
U+05C3	׃	Hebrew Punctuation Sof Pasuq
U+05C6	׆	Hebrew Punctuation Nun Hafukha
U+05D0	א	Hebrew Letter Alef
U+05D1	ב	Hebrew Letter Bet
U+05D2	ג	Hebrew Letter Gimel
U+05D3	ד	Hebrew Letter Dalet
U+05D4	ה	Hebrew Letter He
U+05D5	ו	Hebrew Letter Vav
U+05D6	ז	Hebrew Letter Zayin
U+05D7	ח	Hebrew Letter Het
U+05D8	ט	Hebrew Letter Tet
U+05D9	י	Hebrew Letter Yod
U+05DA	ך	Hebrew Letter Final Kaf
U+05DB	כ	Hebrew Letter Kaf
U+05DC	ל	Hebrew Letter Lamed
U+05DD	ם	Hebrew Letter Final Mem
U+05DE	מ	Hebrew Letter Mem
U+05DF	ן	Hebrew Letter Final Nun
U+05E0	נ	Hebrew Letter Nun
U+05E1	ס	Hebrew Letter Samekh
U+05E2	ע	Hebrew Letter Ayin
U+05E3	ף	Hebrew Letter Final Pe
U+05E4	פ	Hebrew Letter Pe
U+05E5	ץ	Hebrew Letter Final Tsadi
U+05E6	צ	Hebrew Letter Tsadi
U+05E7	ק	Hebrew Letter Qof
U+05E8	ר	Hebrew Letter Resh
U+05E9	ש	Hebrew Letter Shin
U+05EA	ת	Hebrew Letter Tav
U+05F0	װ	Hebrew Ligature Yiddish Double Vav
U+05F1	ױ	Hebrew Ligature Yiddish Vav Yod
U+05F2	ײ	Hebrew Ligature Yiddish Double Yod
U+05F3	׳	Hebrew Punctuation Geresh
U+05F4	״	Hebrew Punctuation Gershayim

=== Compact table ===
Hebrew^{[1]}^{[2]} Official Unicode Consortium code chart (PDF)
	0	1	2	3	4	5	6	7	8	9	A	B	C	D	E	F
U+059x		֑	֒	֓	֔	֕	֖	֗	֘	֙	֚	֛	֜	֝	֞	֟
U+05Ax	֠	֡	֢	֣	֤	֥	֦	֧	֨	֩	֪	֫	֬	֭	֮	֯
U+05Bx	ְ	ֱ	ֲ	ֳ	ִ	ֵ	ֶ	ַ	ָ	ֹ	ֺ	ֻ	ּ	ֽ	־	ֿ
U+05Cx	׀	ׁ	ׂ	׃	ׄ	ׅ	׆	ׇ								
U+05Dx	א	ב	ג	ד	ה	ו	ז	ח	ט	י	ך	כ	ל	ם	מ	ן
U+05Ex	נ	ס	ע	ף	פ	ץ	צ	ק	ר	ש	ת					ׯ
U+05Fx	װ	ױ	ײ	׳	״											
Notes 1.As of Unicode version 17.0 2.Grey areas indicate non-assigned code points

Note I: The ligatures װ ױ ײ are intended for Yiddish. They are not used in Hebrew.
Note II: The symbol ״ is called gershayim and is a punctuation mark used in the Hebrew language to denote acronyms. It is written before the last letter in the acronym. Gershayim is also the name of a note of cantillation in the reading of the Torah, printed above the accented letter.

Remaining graphs are in the Alphabetic Presentation Forms block:

Hebrew subset of Alphabetic Presentation Forms^{[1]}^{[2]} Official Unicode Consortium code chart (PDF)
	0	1	2	3	4	5	6	7	8	9	A	B	C	D	E	F
U+FB1x	(U+FB00–U+FB1C omitted)													יִ	ﬞ	ײַ
U+FB2x	ﬠ	ﬡ	ﬢ	ﬣ	ﬤ	ﬥ	ﬦ	ﬧ	ﬨ	﬩	שׁ	שׂ	שּׁ	שּׂ	אַ	אָ
U+FB3x	אּ	בּ	גּ	דּ	הּ	וּ	זּ		טּ	יּ	ךּ	כּ	לּ		מּ	
U+FB4x	נּ	סּ		ףּ	פּ		צּ	קּ	רּ	שּ	תּ	וֹ	בֿ	כֿ	פֿ	ﭏ
Notes 1.As of Unicode version 17.0 2.Grey areas indicate non-assigned code points

Note: In Yiddish orthography only, the glyph, yud-ḥiriq (יִ ), pronounced /i/, can be optionally used, rather than typing yud then ḥiriq (יִ). In Hebrew spelling this would be pronounced /ji/. /i/ is written ḥiriq under the previous letter then yud ( ִ י).

== HTML code tables ==
Note: HTML numeric character references can be in decimal format (&#DDDD;) or hexadecimal format (&#xHHHH;). For example, &#1490; and &#x05D2; (where "05D2" in hexadecimal is the same as "1490" in decimal) both represent the Hebrew letter gimmel.

Hebrew alphabet
ב	בּ	א
&#1489;	&#64305;	&#1488;
ה	ד	ג
&#1492;	&#1491;	&#1490;
ח	ז	ו
&#1495;	&#1494;	&#1493;
כּ	י	ט
&#64315;	&#1497;	&#1496;
ל	ך	כ
&#1500;	&#1498;	&#1499;
נ	ם	מ
&#1504;	&#1501;	&#1502;
ע	ס	ן
&#1506;	&#1505;	&#1503;
ף	פ	פּ
&#1507;	&#1508;	&#64324;
ק	ץ	צ
&#1511;	&#1509;	&#1510;
שׂ	שׁ	ר
&#64299;	&#64298;	&#1512;
ת	תּ	ש
&#1514;	&#64330;	&#1513;

Vowels and unique characters
Patach ַ	Kamatz ָ
&#1463;	&#1464;
Tzere ֵ	Segol ֶ
&#1461;	&#1462;
Holam male וֹ	Holam haser ֹ
&#64331;	&#1465;
Shuruk וּ	Kubutz ֻ
&#64309;	&#1467;
Hiriq haser ִ	Hataf patach ֲ
&#1460;	&‌#1458;
Hataf kamatz ֳ	Hataf segol ֱ
&‌#1459;	&‌#1457;
Shva (nach and na) ְ
&#1456;
Dagesh ּ
&#1468;

== See also ==
- Alphabetic Presentation Forms (Unicode block)
- Hebrew (Unicode block)
- Hebrew alphabet
- Niqqud
- Yiddish orthography
