= I8 =

I8 or I-8 may refer to:

- Interstate 8, a highway in the southwestern United States
- Interstate 8 (EP), an extended play by Modest Mouse
- Resistance: Fall of Man, a video game originally known as I-8
- Straight-eight engine, an uncommon internal combustion engine
- Japanese submarine I-8, a submarine of the Imperial Japanese Navy
- BMW i8, a plug-in hybrid sports car
- Uppland Regiment, a Swedish Army infantry regiment disbanded in 1957
- i8, a name for the 8-bit signed integer, especially in Rust

== See also ==
- 8I (disambiguation)
