= Hebrew punctuation =

Punctuation conventions of the Hebrew language over time

Hebrew punctuation is similar to that of English and other Western languages, Modern Hebrew having imported additional punctuation marks from these languages in order to avoid the ambiguities sometimes occasioned by the relative lack of such symbols in Biblical Hebrew.

== Punctuation ==
=== Quotation marks ===
Example
Standard	Alternate
”שָׁלוֹם”	„שָׁלוֹם”

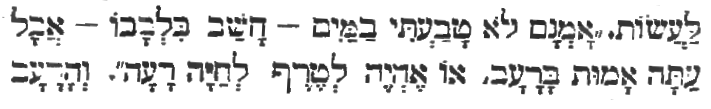
Old style Hebrew quotation marks, from a 1923 translation of Robinson Crusoe

With most printed Hebrew texts from the early 1970s and before, opening quotation marks are low (as in German), and closing ones are high, often going above the letters themselves (as opposed to the gershayim, which is level with the top of letters). An example of this system is „שָׁלוֹם”.

However, this distinction in Hebrew between opening and closing quotation marks has mostly disappeared, and today, quotations are most often punctuated as they are in English (such as ”שָׁלוֹם”), with both quotation marks high. This is due to the advent of the Hebrew keyboard layout, which lacks the opening quotation mark ⟨⟩, as that too is absent from the Hebrew keyboard.

Standard	Alternative	Names
"…"	"…"	merkhaʾot — מֵרְכָאוֹת (plural of merkha — מֵרְכָא); a similar punctuation mark unique to Hebrew is called gershayim — גרשיים

=== Period, question mark, exclamation mark, comma ===
Periods (full stops), question marks, exclamation marks, and commas are used as in English.

A Hebrew period in a traditional serif face usually has defined corners (similar to a diamond). This is also true for other dots in punctuation, such as in the question mark and exclamation mark.

In Arabic, which is also written from right to left, the question mark ⟨؟⟩ is mirrored right-to-left from the Latin question mark. (Some browsers may display the character in the previous sentence as a forward question mark due to font or text directionality issues.) Hebrew is also written right-to-left, but uses a question mark that appears on the page in the same orientation as Latin ⟨?⟩. Note that Hebrew commas are not mirrored – although that was proposed in the 19th century (together with mirrored semi-colons, capital letters, etc.) by a British minister, William Withers Ewbank.

=== Colon and sof pasuq ===
Stemming from Biblical Hebrew, a sof pasuq ⟨ ׃ ⟩ is the equivalent of a period, and is used in some writings such as prayer books. Since a sof pasuq is absent from the Hebrew keyboard layout, and looks very similar to the colon ⟨:⟩, a colon is often substituted for it.

Glyph	Unicode	Name
׃	U+05C3	HEBREW PUNCTUATION SOF PASUQ
:	U+003A	COLON

=== Vertical bar and paseq ===
Example
Standard
אֱלֹהִים׀

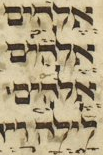
In the image above, the paseq can be seen on the last occurrence of the word אֱלֹהִים

The paseq (Hebrew: פָּסֵק) ⟨׀⟩ originates from Biblical Hebrew. As it is not on a standard Hebrew keyboard, a vertical bar ⟨⟩ is often used instead. However, it is seldom if ever used in modern Israeli Hebrew, and is not mentioned on the Academy of the Hebrew Language's guide to modern Hebrew punctuation. The height of the paseq depends on the font, but it is generally the same as the letter א.

Like much Biblical Hebrew punctuation, the meaning of the paseq is not known, although a number of hypotheses exist. The word itself means "separator", but this name was a medieval innovation by later Jews; the root פּ־ס־ק does not exist in the Biblical Hebrew canon. James Kennedy, an English hebraist, wrote a book about the paseq in which he hypothesized that it was an ancient mark serving the same purpose as the modern word sic (in non-Latin texts). The Westminster Leningrad Codex contains over 500 paseqs; William Wickes, an influential scholar in this area, divide them into nine classes; Wilhelm Gesenius, drawing on Wickes, divided them into five:

- as a divider between two words which end and begin with the same letters, e.g. שָׁלוֹם׀ מַ (Shalom, ma)
- between identical or very similar words, e.g. רַקדָן׀ רָקַד (the dancer danced)
- between words which are to a high degree contradictory, e.g. אֱלֹהִים׀ רֶשַׁע (God, evil)
- between words otherwise liable to be wrongly connected, e.g. כַּף׀ תּוֹר, which prevents the somewhat bizarre phrase כַּף (kaf, spoon) תּוֹר (tor, queue) from being wrongly read as כַּפְתּוֹר (kaftor), meaning button.
- "and lastly, between heterogeneous terms, as Eleazar the High Priest, and Joshua" (אֶלְעָזָ֣ר הַכֹּהֵ֣ן׀ וִיהוֹשֻׁ֪עַ—see context in Joshua 19:51)

An example may be found in Genesis 1:5 in the Westminster Leningrad Codex and many other manuscripts:

וַיִּקְרָ֨א אֱלֹהִ֤ים׀ לָאוֹר֙ י֔וֹם וְלַחֹ֖שֶׁךְ קָ֣רָא לָ֑יְלָה וַֽיְהִי־עֶ֥רֶב וַֽיְהִי־בֹ֖קֶר י֥וֹם אֶחָֽד׃ פ

Glyph	Unicode	Name
׀	U+05C0	HEBREW PUNCTUATION PASEQ
|	U+007C	VERTICAL LINE

=== Hyphen and maqaf ===
Example
Hebrew maqaf	Standard English hyphen
עַל־יְדֵי	עַל‑יְדֵי
The maqaf aligns with the top horizontal strokes, whereas the standard English hyphen is in the middle of the letters.

The maqaf (מַקָּף) ⟨־⟩ is the Hebrew hyphen ⟨-⟩, and has virtually the same purpose for connecting two words as in English. It is different from the hyphen in its positioning (a hyphen is in the middle in terms of height, the maqaf is at the top) and it has a biblical origin, unlike many other Modern Hebrew punctuation symbols, which have simply been imported from European languages.

The original purpose of the maqaf was to show that two words should be considered one for the purpose of dagesh placement, vowels, stress (ṭaʿam, טַעַם), and cantillation. This use continues into the present beyond reprintings of Biblical texts; for example, the sheet music for modern Hebrew songs is normally printed with them. The maqaf is well-used in Hebrew typography; most books and newspapers use it and have the hyphens higher than one would find in English. In typed documents, however, it is frequently not used because before the 2010s it was absent from most keyboards or cumbersome to type. As a consequence, the common hyphen ⟨-⟩ is most often used in online writings. This situation can be compared to that of users writing in Latin alphabets using the easily available hyphen-minus ⟨-⟩ over hyphen ⟨‐⟩, minus ⟨−⟩, en dash ⟨–⟩, and em dash ⟨—⟩. As of the 2010s, it is possible to insert the maqaf ⟨־⟩ using most common computer and mobile phone operating systems.

Glyph	Unicode	Name
־	U+05BE	HEBREW PUNCTUATION MAQAF
-	U+002D	HYPHEN-MINUS

=== Brackets/parentheses ===
Brackets or parentheses, ⟨(⟩ and ⟨)⟩ are the same in Hebrew as in English. Since Hebrew is written from right to left, ⟨)⟩ becomes an opening bracket, and ⟨(⟩ a closing bracket, the opposite from English, which is written left to right.

=== Israeli currency ===
Example
With shekel sign	With abbreviation
Israeli new shekel
₪12,000	12,000ש״ח
Israeli pound
I£12,000	12,000ל״י

The shekel sign (₪) is the currency sign for the Israeli currency (the Israeli new shekel), in the way $, £, and € exist for other currencies. The shekel sign, like the dollar sign ⟨$⟩, is usually placed to the left of the number (so ₪12,000, rather than 12,000₪), but since Hebrew is written from right to left, the symbol is actually written after the number. It is either not separated from the preceding number, or is separated only by a thin space.

Unlike the dollar sign, the new shekel sign is not used that often when handwriting monetary amounts, and is generally replaced by the abbreviation ש״ח (standing for sheqel ẖadash, lit. "new shekel"). The new shekel sign can be typed on desktop Linux and Windows 8 and higher systems using the combination AltGr-4 according to the SI 1452 standard.

The short-lived Israeli old shekel, on the other hand, which had the symbol, (Note: As of December 2024, this symbol does not exist in Unicode.) is rarely referred to in Israeli texts; both due to its lifespan of only five years and the fact that due to hyperinflation it lost value daily, so that referring to a value in Israeli old shekels, even in retrospective writing, is essentially meaningless without knowing the exact time the figure was quoted. As prices changed so rapidly, advertising of the time predominately used dollars; when the shekel was referred to at all, it was with the letter S or its full Hebrew name—שֶׁקֶל; although certain banks, such as Bank Leumi, used the letter ש to refer to it on checks, as well as the Latin letters "I.S."

The Israeli pound was the Israeli currency until 1980. Its sign is I£, and its abbreviation is ל״י.

=== Geresh and gershayim ===
Example
Geresh	Apostrophe used as a geresh
צ׳ארלס	צ'ארלס
Gershayim	Quotation marks used as gershayim
צה״ל	צה"ל

The geresh ⟨׳⟩, is the Hebrew equivalent of a period in abbreviations (e.g. abbrev.), in addition to being attached to Hebrew letters to indicate sounds like soft g [dʒ] and ch [tʃ] in foreign names such as Charles (צ׳ארלס) and Jake (ג׳ייק). The gershayim ⟨״⟩, is a Hebrew symbol indicating that a sequence of characters is an acronym, and is placed before the last character of the word. Owing to a Hebrew keyboard's having neither a geresh nor gershayim, they are usually replaced online with, respectively, the visually similar apostrophe ⟨⟩ and quotation mark {{angbr|"⟩. The quotation mark and apostrophe are higher than the geresh and gershayim: where the latter are placed level with the top of Hebrew letters, the apostrophe and quotation marks are above them.

Some Hebrew-specific fonts (fonts designed primarily for Hebrew letters), such as David, Narkisim and FrankRuehl, do not feature the apostrophe and quotation marks as such but use the geresh and gershayim to substitute for them.

Glyph	Unicode	Name
׳	U+05F3	HEBREW PUNCTUATION GERESH
״	U+05F4	HEBREW PUNCTUATION GERSHAYIM
'	U+0027	APOSTROPHE
"	U+0022	QUOTATION MARK

=== Mathematics ===
Mathematical expressions are written in Hebrew using the same symbols as in English, including Western numerals, which are written left to right. The only variant that exists is an alternative plus sign, which is a plus sign that looks like an inverted capital T. Unicode has this symbol at position U+FB29 ﬩ HEBREW LETTER ALTERNATIVE PLUS SIGN. The reason for this practice is that it avoids the writing of a symbol "+" that looks like a Christian cross.

Examples of mathematical expressions written in Hebrew
General example	With alternative plus sign
6 + [(1 × 2) ÷ 2] = 7	6 ﬩ [(1 × 2) ÷ 2] = 7
Mathematical expressions in Hebrew are nearly the same as in English.

=== Reversed nun ===
Examples
Ordinary letter nun	Reversed nun – vertical flip
Reversed nun – horizontal flip	Reversed nun – Z-shape

Reversed nun (also called inverted nun, nun hafukha, or nun menuzzeret) is a rare character found in two Biblical Hebrew texts. Although in Judaic literature it is known as nun hafukha ("reversed nun"), it does not function as any sort of letter in the text. It is not part of a word, and it is not read aloud in any way. It is simply a mark that is written, and is therefore a punctuation mark, not a letter. Also, it is surrounded by space.

While it depends on the particular manuscript or printed edition, it is found in nine places: twice in the Book of Numbers (prior to and after Numbers 10:34-36), and seven times in Psalm 107. It is uncertain today what it was intended to signify.

In many manuscripts, it does not even resemble a transformed nun at all, and when it does, it sometimes appears reversed (as mentioned above), sometimes inverted, and sometimes turned through 180°. Other times it appears to look like the letter Z.

Glyph	Unicode	Name
׆	U+05C6	HEBREW PUNCTUATION NUN HAFUKHA

== Hebrew points (vowels) ==
Example
With vowel points	Without vowel points
עַל־יְדֵי	על־ידי
יִשְׂרָאֵל	ישראל

These signs (points, neqqudot) indicate voweling or some other aspects of the pronunciation of a letter or word. While in Modern Hebrew they are not generally used outside poetry and children's books, a vowel point or other diacritic is occasionally added to resolve ambiguity.

One of these neqqudot, the rafe, is no longer used in Hebrew, even though it is routinely used in Yiddish spelling (as defined by YIVO).

Glyph	Unicode	Name
ְ	U+05B0	SHEVA
ֱ	U+05B1	HATEF SEGOL
ֲ	U+05B2	HATEF PATAH
ֳ	U+05B3	HATEF QAMATS
ִ	U+05B4	HIRIQ
ֵ	U+05B5	TSERE
ֶ	U+05B6	SEGOL
ַ	U+05B7	PATAH
ָ	U+05B8	QAMATS
ֹ	U+05B9	HOLAM (HASER)
ֻ	U+05BB	QUBUTS
ּ	U+05BC	DAGESH, MAPIQ, OR SHURUQ
ֽ	U+05BD	METEG
ֿ	U+05BF	RAFE
ׁ	U+05C1	SHIN DOT
ׂ	U+05C2	SIN DOT
ׄ	U+05C4	MARK UPPER DOT
ׅ	U+05C5	MARK LOWER DOT

== Hebrew cantillation marks ==
Example (Genesis 1:1–5)
With Vowel Points and Cantillation Marks
בְּרֵאשִׁ֖ית בָּרָ֣א אֱלֹהִ֑ים אֵ֥ת הַשָּׁמַ֖יִם וְאֵ֥ת הָאָֽרֶץ׃ וְהָאָ֗רֶץ הָיְתָ֥ה תֹ֙הוּ֙ וָבֹ֔הוּ וְחֹ֖שֶׁךְ עַל־פְּנֵ֣י תְה֑וֹם וְר֣וּחַ אֱלֹהִ֔ים מְרַחֶ֖פֶת עַל־פְּנֵ֥י הַמָּֽיִם׃ וַיֹּ֥אמֶר אֱלֹהִ֖ים יְהִ֣י א֑וֹר וַֽיְהִי־אֽוֹר׃ וַיַּ֧רְא אֱלֹהִ֛ים אֶת־הָא֖וֹר כִּי־ט֑וֹב וַיַּבְדֵּ֣ל אֱלֹהִ֔ים בֵּ֥ין הָא֖וֹר וּבֵ֥ין הַחֹֽשֶׁךְ׃ וַיִּקְרָ֨א אֱלֹהִ֤ים׀ לָאוֹר֙ י֔וֹם וְלַחֹ֖שֶׁךְ קָ֣רָא לָ֑יְלָה וַֽיְהִי־עֶ֥רֶב וַֽיְהִי־בֹ֖קֶר י֥וֹם אֶחָֽד׃
Just Cantillation Marks
(For Demonstration)
בראש֖ית בר֣א אלה֑ים א֥ת השמ֖ים וא֥ת האֽרץ׃ והא֗רץ הית֥ה ת֙הו֙ וב֔הו וח֖שך על־פנ֣י תה֑ום ור֣וח אלה֔ים מרח֖פת על־פנ֥י המֽים׃ וי֥אמר אלה֖ים יה֣י א֑ור וֽיהי־אֽור׃ וי֧רא אלה֛ים את־הא֖ור כי־ט֑וב ויבד֣ל אלה֔ים ב֥ין הא֖ור וב֥ין החֽשך׃ ויקר֨א אלה֤ים׀ לאור֙ י֔ום ולח֖שך ק֣רא ל֑ילה וֽיהי־ע֥רב וֽיהי־ב֖קר י֥ום אחֽד׃
No Cantillation or Vowel Points
בראשית ברא אלהים את השמים ואת הארץ׃ והארץ היתה תהו ובהו וחשך על־פני תהום ורוח אלהים מרחפת על־פני המים׃ ויאמר אלהים יהי אור ויהי־אור׃ וירא אלהים את־האור כי־טוב ויבדל אלהים בין האור ובין החשך׃ ויקרא אלהים׀ לאור יום ולחשך קרא לילה ויהי־ערב ויהי־בקר יום אחד׃

The cantillation marks (Hebrew: טעמים teʿamim) have a very specialized use. They are only found in printed Hebrew texts of Tanakh to be used as a guide for chanting the text, either from the printed text or, in the case of the public reading of the Torah, to be memorized along with vowel marks as the Sefer Torah includes only the letters of the text without cantillation or vowel marks. Outside the Tanakh, the cantillation marks are not used in modern spoken or written Hebrew at all. The cantillation marks provide a structure to sentences of Tanakh similar to that provided by punctuation marks.

cantillation
Sof passuk	׃	Paseq	׀
Etnakhta/atnakh	֑	Segol	֒
Shalshelet	֓	Zakef katan	֔
Zakef gadol	֕	Tifcha/tarkha	֖
Rivia	֗	Zarka	֘
Pashta	֙	Yetiv	֚
Tevir	֛	Geresh	֜
Geresh muqdam	֝	Gershayim	֞
Karne parah	֟	Telisha gedola/talsha	֠
Pazer	֡	Atnah hafukh	֢
Munakh/shofar holekh	֣	Mahpach	֤
Merkha/ma’arikh	֥	Mercha kefula	֦
Darga	֧	Qadma	֨
Telisha qetana/tarsa	֩	Yerah ben yomo	֪
Ole	֫	Illuy	֬
Dehi	֭	Tsinnorit	֮

== See also ==
- Hebrew keyboard
- Hebrew spelling
