= 8i (virtual reality) =

New Zealand based virtual reality software company

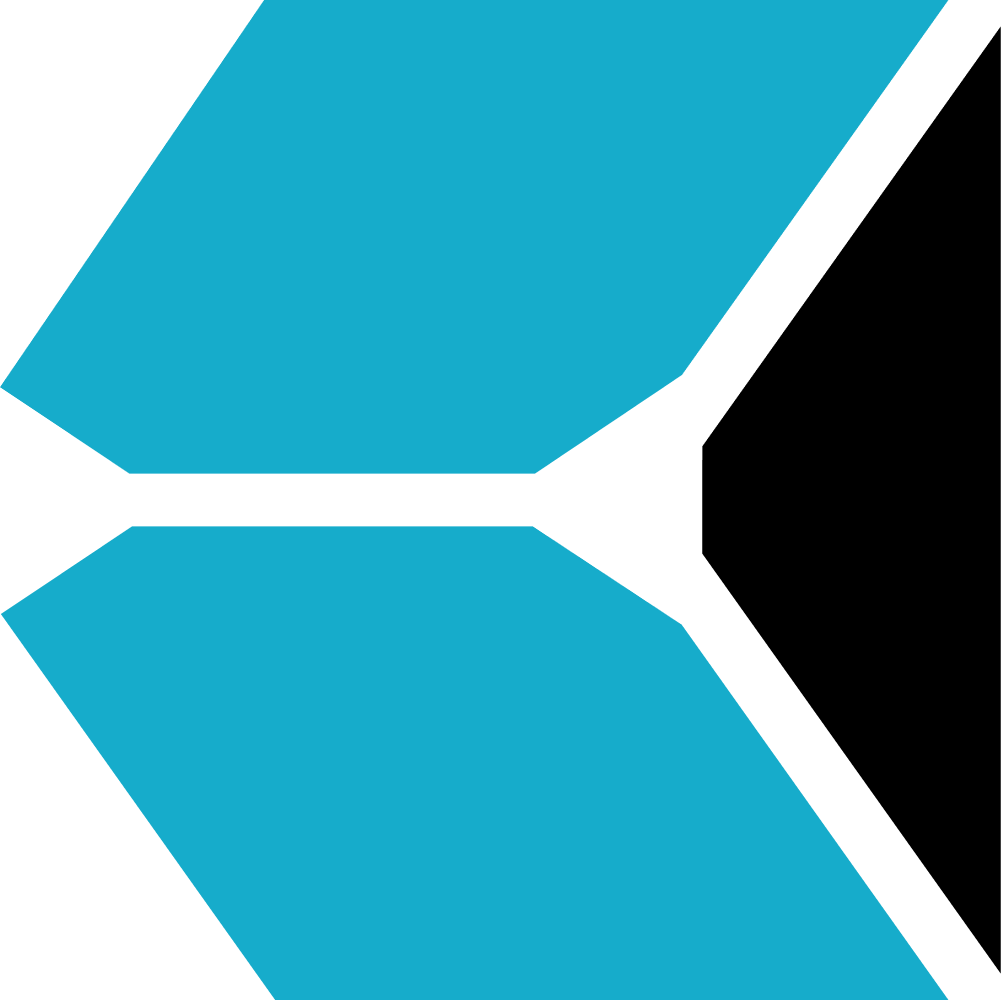
- Company type: Private
- Founders: Linc Gasking; Eugene d'Eon; Sebastian Marino; Joshua Feast
- CEO: Hayes Mackaman
- Website: Official website
- Launched: 2014
- Current status: Active

8i is a company specializing in the capture, transformation, and streaming of volumetric video.

== History ==
8i was founded in May 2014 by Linc Gasking, Eugene d'Eon, Sebastian Marino and Joshua Feast to develop software that can capture, analyze, compress, and recreate all the viewpoints required for volumetric capture.

In October 2015, 8i raised $13.5 million in Series A funding. Investors included RRE Ventures, Founders Fund Science, Samsung Ventures, and Dolby Family Ventures.

In January 2016, 8i premiered #100humans at the 2016 Sundance Film Festival as part of its New Frontier exhibit. The program featured four VR projects that placed characters captured using 8i technology in distinct environments ranging from a dystopian wasteland to the Grand Canyon.

In October 2018, Hayes Mackaman became CEO and relaunched the company in 2019.
