= ISO-8859-8-I =

Character set

ISO-8859-8-I is the IANA charset name for the character encoding ISO/IEC 8859-8 used together with the control codes from ISO/IEC 6429 for the C0 (00–1F hex) and C1 (80–9F) parts. The characters are in logical order.

Escape sequences (from ISO/IEC 6429 or ISO/IEC 2022) are not to be interpreted. Most applications only interpret the control codes for LF, CR, and HT. A few applications also interpret VT, FF, and NEL (in C1). Very few applications interpret the other C0 and C1 control codes.

ISO-8859-8 is sometimes in logical order (HTML, XML), and sometimes in visual (left-to-right) order (plain text without any markup). The WHATWG Encoding Standard used by HTML5 treats ISO-8859-8 and ISO-8859-8-I as distinct encodings with the same mapping due to influence on the layout direction, but notes that this no longer applies to ISO-8859-6 (Arabic), only to ISO-8859-8.

Logical order for this charset requires bidi processing for display.
