= Shekel sign =

Currency sign for the Israeli shekel

₪

New Shekel
- Other names: New Sheqel
- In Unicode: U+20AA ₪ NEW SHEQEL SIGN

Related
- See also: (Old Israeli shekel)

The two ways of representing shekels. The "₪" symbol on the left and the abbreviation "ש״ח" on the right may be used interchangeably.

The shekel sign ⟨₪⟩ is a currency sign used for the shekel, the currency of Israel.

== Israeli new shekel (1986–present) ==
The Israeli new shekel (Hebrew: שקל חדש, romanized: šéqel ħadáš, IPA: [ˈʃekel χaˈdaʃ]), also known by the acronym NIS (Hebrew: ש״ח, IPA: [ʃaχ]), was announced officially on 22 September 1985, when the first new shekel banknotes and coins were introduced. It is constructed by combining the two Hebrew letters that constitute the acronym (the first letter of each of the two words, Hebrew being written from right to left): ⟨ש⟩ and ⟨ח⟩. Sometimes the ⟨₪⟩ symbol (Unicode 20AA) is used following the number, other times the acronym ש״ח.

The Israeli toll road symbol bearing the Shekel sign.

The shekel sign, like the dollar sign ⟨$⟩, is usually placed left of the number (i.e. "₪12,000" and not "12,000₪"), but since Hebrew is written from right to left, this means that the symbol is actually written after the number. It is either not separated from the preceding number, or is separated only by a thin space.

According to the Academy of the Hebrew Language recommendation for writing numbers in Hebrew, the sign should be written to the left of the number without a space between them.

Unlike the dollar sign, the new shekel sign is not used that often when handwriting monetary amounts.

The road sign announcing the entrance to an Israeli toll road, such as Highway 6 or the Carmel Tunnels, is a shekel symbol with a road in the background.

=== Unicode and input ===
The symbol has the Unicode code point U+20AA ₪ NEW SHEQEL SIGN. It has been in Unicode since June 1993, version 1.1.0.

Under the Unicode bidirectional algorithm, typing the sign after the number will cause it to be displayed to the right of the number in any text directions. This contradicts the recommendation of the Academy of the Hebrew Language to place the sign to the left of the number in the Hebrew caption.

Using the standard Hebrew keyboard (SI 1452), it must be typed as AltGr+A (the letter ש appears on the same key in regular Hebrew mode). The Shekel sign, however, is not engraved on most keyboards sold in Israel and the sign is rarely used in day-to-day typing.

- On systems with the Hebrew keyboard layout set, it can be typed on modern (Note: Windows 8 or later) Microsoft Windows, desktop Linux and ChromeOS by using AltGr+4. (⇧ Shift+4 makes the dollar sign and AltGr+A is used to type shva.)
- On most Unix heritage systems, it can be entered by holding down Ctrl+Shift+u (an underlined u will appear), releasing and then typing the Unicode code point 20aa then space or ↵ Enter, irrespective of keyboard setting.
- On Mac OS X it can be typed as ⇧ Shift+7 when the system is set to a Hebrew keyboard layout.

== Old Israeli shekel (1980–1985) ==

The old Israeli shekel, ⟨⟩, in circulation between 1980 and 1985, had a different symbol, which was officially announced on 18 March 1980. Before the introduction of the old shekel in 1980, there was no special symbol for the Israeli currency. It was a stylized Shin shaped like a cradle (i.e. rounded and opening upward). This symbol appeared on checks issued by Israeli banks between 1980 and 1985. Quoting prices in new shekels started officially on 1 January 1986, and the old shekel checks remaining unused had to be stamped with the new shekel symbol over the old symbol.

== See also ==
- Israeli shekel
- Israeli agora
- Currency symbol
