= Standards Institution of Israel =

Israeli state-owned corporation

Coordinates: 32°6′34.77″N 34°48′9.19″E

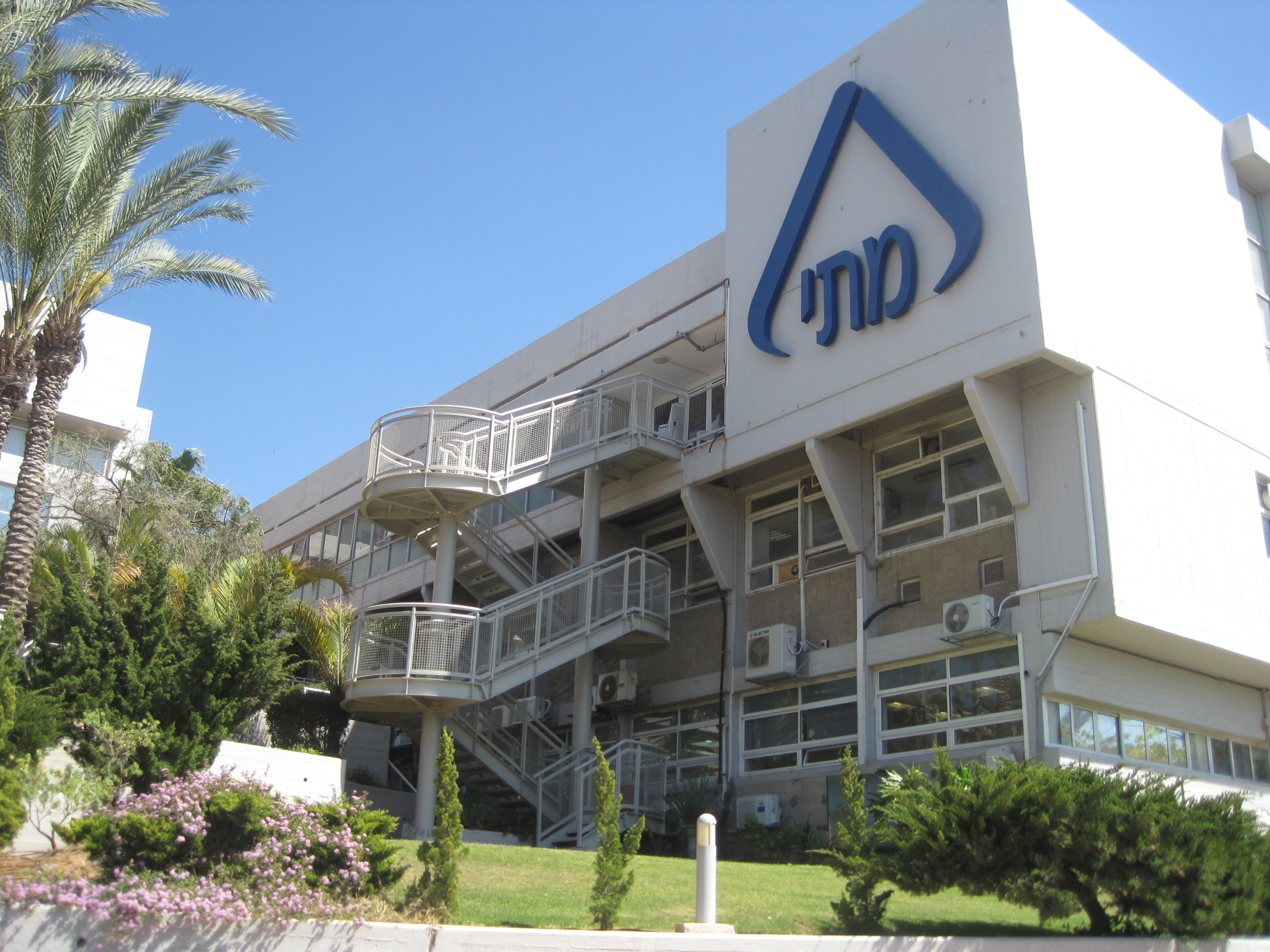

The Standards Institution of Israel (SII) (Hebrew: מכון התקנים הישראלי, Makhon haTkanim haIsraeli), known in Hebrew as "Mati," is a state-owned corporation responsible for setting standards for products and services provided in Israel. The Standards Institution tests and certifies products, granting a "standards mark" (tav teken). It also verifies that certified products maintain their quality over time.

== History ==
The Standards Institution was established in 1945 by the Society of Engineers and Architects. It was registered as a company and independently set its standards, conducting quality testing and conducting surveys and studies. It was an outgrowth of the Materials Testing Laboratory established in 1923 to check the quality of building materials. Only 30 years after launching the laboratory in 1953, the Institution was legally acknowledged as the supreme authority for setting Israeli standards in keeping with the Law of Standards (1953). The offices of the Standards Institution are located in the Ramat Aviv district of Tel Aviv, near Tel Aviv University.

Its primary task is determining standards and enforcing them. The Institution ensures quality control, does international market surveys, and conducts extensive studies about markets for various products.

The SII operates product and system certification programs. Use of the Standards Mark is generally voluntary although some products must be certified before they are sold in keeping with Israeli law.

To mark the centennial of the Standards Institution, a stamp was issued by the Israel Postal Company.

== Administration ==
- SII chairman - Former Knesset member Ran Cohen
- CEO - Gilad Golub
- Director, Industry division - Yakov Vechtel
- Director, Quality & Certification Division (QCD) - Eli Cohen-Kagan
- Director, standardizations - Helen Atarot

== See also ==
- Economy of Israel
