= Plus–minus sign =

Symbol combining both + and - signs

±o

Plus–minus sign
- In Unicode: U+00B1 ± PLUS-MINUS SIGN (&plusmn;, &PlusMinus;, &pm;)

Related
- See also: U+2213 ∓ MINUS-OR-PLUS SIGN (&MinusPlus;, &mnplus;, &mp;)

The plus–minus sign or plus-or-minus sign (±) and the complementary minus-or-plus sign (∓) are symbols with broadly similar multiple meanings.

- In mathematics, the ± sign generally indicates a choice of exactly two possible values, one of which is obtained through addition and the other through subtraction. The ∓ is typically used only in tandem with the ± sign and indicates that in the case that the ± is a +, the ∓ would be a − (and vice-versa).
- In statistics and experimental sciences, the ± sign commonly indicates the confidence interval or uncertainty bounding a range of possible errors in a measurement, often the standard deviation or standard error. The sign may also represent an inclusive range of values that a reading might have.
- In chess, the ± sign indicates a clear advantage for the white player; the complementary minus-plus sign (∓) indicates a clear advantage for the black player.

Other meanings occur in other fields, including medicine, engineering, chemistry, electronics, linguistics, and philosophy.

== History ==
A version of the sign, including also the French word ou ("or"), was used in its mathematical meaning by Albert Girard in 1626, and the sign in its modern form was used as early as 1631, in William Oughtred's Clavis Mathematicae.

== Usage ==
=== In mathematics ===
In mathematical formulas, the ± symbol may be used to indicate a symbol that may be replaced by either of the plus and minus signs, + or −, allowing the formula to represent two values or two equations.

If x^{2} = 9, one may give the solution as x = ±3. This indicates that the equation has two solutions: x = +3 and x = −3. A common use of this notation is found in the quadratic formula

$$x = \frac{-b \pm \sqrt{b^2-4ac}}{2a},$$

which describes the two conjugate solutions to the quadratic equation ax^{2} + bx + c = 0.

A related usage is found in this presentation of the formula for the Taylor series of the sine function:

$$\sin\left( x \right) = x - \frac{x^3}{3!} + \frac{x^5}{5!} - \frac{x^7}{7!} + \cdots \pm \frac{1}{(2n+1)!} x^{2n+1} + \cdots$$

Here, the plus-or-minus sign indicates that the term may be added or subtracted depending on whether n is odd or even; a rule which can be deduced from the first few terms. A more rigorous presentation would multiply each term by a factor of (−1)^{n}, which gives +1 when n is even, and −1 when n is odd. In older texts one occasionally finds (−)^{n}, which means the same.

The minus–plus sign, ∓, is generally used in conjunction with the ± sign, and always has the opposite sign to ±. For example, x ± y ∓ z, is a shorthand for x + y − z or x − y + z (but not x + y + z or x − y − z).

The above expression could be rewritten as x ± (y − z) to avoid use of ∓, but cases such as this trigonometric identity are most neatly written using the "∓" sign:

$$\cos(A \pm B) = \cos(A) \cos(B) \mp \sin(A) \sin(B)$$

which represents the two equations:

$$\begin{align}
\cos(A + B) &= \cos(A)\cos(B) - \sin(A) \sin(B),\text{ and} \\
\cos(A - B) &= \cos(A)\cos(B) + \sin(A) \sin(B). \end{align}$$

Another example is the sum and difference of cubes

$$x^3 \pm y^3 = (x \pm y)\left((x \mp y)^2 \pm xy\right)$$

which represents the two equations:

$$\begin{align}
x^3 + y^3 &= (x + y)\left((x - y)^2 + xy\right),\text{ and} \\
x^3 - y^3 &= (x - y)\left((x + y)^2 - xy\right). \end{align}$$

When both ± and ∓ signs appear in an equation, it is unambiguous that all such signs are correlated; the shorthand describes exactly two equations. When only ± signs appear, the standard mathematical convention is that they all take on the same value, so for example the trigonometric identity
$$\sin(A \pm B) = \sin(A) \cos(B) \pm \cos(A) \sin(B)$$
is also a shorthand for two equations: one with + on both sides of the equation, and one with − on both sides.

However, this may be modified by the surrounding text, which may state "where the ‘±’ signs are independent" or similar. If such a simple description is not possible, the equation must be re-written to provide clarity; e.g. by introducing variables such as s_{1}, s_{2}, ... and specifying the appropriate relation, such as s_{3} = s_{1} · (s_{2})^{n}.

=== In statistics ===
The use of ± for an approximation is most commonly encountered in presenting the numerical value of a quantity, together with its tolerance or its statistical margin of error. For example, 5.7 ± 0.2 may be anywhere in the range from 5.5 to 5.9 inclusive. In scientific usage, it sometimes refers to a probability of being within the stated interval, usually corresponding to either 1 or 2 standard deviations (a probability of 68.3% or 95.4% in a normal distribution).

Operations involving uncertain values should always try to preserve the uncertainty, in order to avoid propagation of error. If n = a ± b, any operation of the form m = f(n) must return a value of the form m = c ± d, where c is f(a) and d is the range b updated using interval arithmetic.

=== In chess ===
The symbols ± and ∓ are used in chess annotation to denote a moderate but significant advantage for White and Black, respectively. Weaker and stronger advantages are denoted by ⩲ and ⩱ for only a slight advantage, and +– and –+ for a strong, potentially winning advantage, again for White and Black respectively.

=== Other meanings ===
- In medicine, it may mean "with or without" in some cases.
- In engineering, the sign indicates the tolerance, which is the range of values that are considered to be acceptable or safe, or which comply with some standard or with a contract.
- In chemistry, the sign is used to indicate a racemic mixture.
- In electronics, this sign may indicate a dual voltage power supply, such as ±5 volts means +5 volts and −5 volts, when used with audio circuits and operational amplifiers.
- In linguistics, it may indicate a distinctive feature, such as [±voiced].

== Encodings ==
- In Unicode: U+00B1 ± PLUS-MINUS SIGN
- In ISO 8859-1, -7, -8, -9, -13, -15, and -16, the plus–minus symbol is code 0xB1_{hex}. This location was copied to Unicode.
- In HTML, the symbol also has character entity reference representations of &pm;, &plusmn;
- The rarer minus–plus sign is not generally found in legacy encodings, but is available in Unicode as U+2213 ∓ MINUS-OR-PLUS SIGN so can be used in HTML using &#x2213; or &#8723;.
- In TeX 'plus-or-minus' and 'minus-or-plus' symbols are denoted \pm and \mp, respectively.
- Although these characters may be approximated by underlining or overlining a + symbol ( + or + ), this is discouraged because the formatting may be stripped at a later date, changing the meaning. It also makes the meaning less accessible to blind users with screen readers.

== Similar characters ==
The plus–minus sign resembles the Chinese characters 土 (Radical 32) and 士 (Radical 33), whereas the minus–plus sign resembles 干 (Radical 51).

== See also ==
- ≈ (approximately equal to)
- Engineering tolerance – Permissible limit or limits of variation
- Plus and minus signs
- Sign (mathematics)
- Table of mathematical symbols
- Unicode input – Input characters using their Unicode code points
