= Kaph =

Eleventh letter of many Semitic alphabets

← Yodh Kaph Lamedh →
- Phoenician: 𐤊
- Hebrew: כך
- Samaritan: ࠊ
- Aramaic: 𐡊
- Syriac: ܟ
- Nabataean: 𐢏𐢎
- Arabic: ك
- South Arabian: 𐩫
- Geʽez: ከ
- North Arabian: 𐪋
- Ugaritic: 𐎋
- Phonemic representation: k (x)
- Position in alphabet: 11
- Numerical value: 20

Alphabetic derivatives of the Phoenician
- Greek: Κ
- Latin: K
- Cyrillic: К

Kaph (also spelled kaf) is the eleventh letter of the Semitic abjads, including Phoenician kāp 𐤊, Hebrew kāp̄ כ, Aramaic kāp 𐡊, Syriac kāp̄ ܟ, and Arabic kāf ك (in abjadi order). It is also related to the Ancient North Arabian 𐪋, South Arabian 𐩫, and Ge'ez ከ.

The Phoenician letter gave rise to the Greek kappa (Κ), Latin K, and Cyrillic К.

== Origin ==
Kaph is thought to be derived from a pictogram of the palm of a hand (in both modern Arabic and Hebrew, kaph כַּף means "palm" or "grip"), though in Arabic the a in the name of the letter (كاف) is pronounced longer than the a in the word meaning "palm" (كَف). The small ک above the kāf in its final and isolated forms ⟨ك ـك⟩ was originally ‘alāmatu-l-ihmāl, but became a permanent part of the letter. Previously this sign could also appear above the medial form of kāf, instead of the stroke on its ascender.

D46

== Arabic kāf ==
Kāf كاف
- ك

Usage
- Writing system: Arabic script
- Type: Abjad
- Language of origin: Arabic language
- Sound values: k
- Alphabetical position: 22

History
- Development: 𐤊: 𐡊; 𐢎, 𐢏; ك

Other
- Writing direction: Right-to-left

The letter is named kāf, and it is written in several ways depending on its position in the word.

There are four variants of the letter:

- The basic form is used for the Arabic language and many other languages and is the Naskh glyph form.

Position in word:	Isolated	Final	Medial	Initial
Glyph form: (Help)	ك	ـك	ـكـ	كـ

- The cross-barred form, al-kāf al-maškūlah or al-kāf al-mašqūqah, is the Nastaliq form used predominantly in the Perso-Arabic script and as an alternative form of the version above in all forms of Arabic. It has a particular use in the Sindhi language of Pakistan where it represents the aspirated /kʰ/ and is called keheh.

Position in word:	Isolated	Final	Medial	Initial
Glyph form: (Help)	ک	ـک	ـکـ	کـ

- The long s-shaped variant form, al-kāf al-mabsūṭah, which is used in Arabic texts and in Thuluth and Kufic. It is a separate letter in the Sindhi language of Pakistan, where it represents the unaspirated /k/.

Position in word:	Isolated	Final	Medial	Initial
Glyph form: (Help)	ڪ	ـڪ	ـڪـ	ڪـ

- The variant of letter khe in Persian, and in Tausug with a line above named gaf is used, and it is thus written as:

Position in word:	Isolated	Final	Medial	Initial
Glyph form: (Help)	گ	ـگ	ـگـ	گـ

Other than the four variants of the letter kāf as mentioned below, there are also five other variants of the Persian letter gaf, namely,

- the letter khe with one dot above is used in the Jawi alphabet, and it is thus written as:

Position in word:	Isolated	Final	Medial	Initial
Glyph form: (Help)	ݢ	ـݢ	ـݢـ	ݢـ

- the letter kāf with three dots below is used in the Pegon alphabet, using a modified basic form of kāf, and it is thus written as:

Position in word:	Isolated	Final	Medial	Initial
Glyph form: (Help)	ڮ	ـڮ	ـڮـ	ڮـ

- the letter kāf with one dot below is also used in the Pegon alphabet for writing Javanese and Sundanese in Arabic script, but is also used in the Arwi alphabet for the Tamil language to represent /ɡ/, and it is thus written as:

Position in word:	Isolated	Final	Medial	Initial
Glyph form: (Help)	ࢴ	ـࢴ	ـࢴـ	ࢴـ

- the letter khe with a ring is used in Pashto, and it is thus written as:

Position in word:	Isolated	Final	Medial	Initial
Glyph form: (Help)	ګ	ـګ	ـګـ	ګـ

- in Chechen, Kabardian, and Adyghe, the Arabic character ࢰ is used to spell /kʼ/ or /t͡ʃʼ/. In Chechen, ⟨گ⟩ is alternatively used as well.

Position in word:	Isolated	Final	Medial	Initial
Glyph form: (Help)	ࢰ	ـࢰ	ـࢰـ	ࢰـ

In Ottoman Turkish, Chagatai, Kazakh, Kyrgyz, Azerbaijani, Uyghur, Moroccan Arabic, Xiao'erjing script, the Arabic letter ng has two forms, namely:

- the letter khe with three dots above is used, and thus it is written as:

Position in word:	Isolated	Final	Medial	Initial
Glyph form: (Help)	ݣ	ـݣ	ـݣـ	ݣـ

- the basic form of the letter kāf with three dots is used, and thus it is written as:

Position in word:	Isolated	Final	Medial	Initial
Glyph form: (Help)	ڭ	ـڭ	ـڭـ	ڭـ

There is also one another variant of the letter ng, which is the letter khe with three dots below, and it is thus written as:

Position in word:	Isolated	Final	Medial	Initial
Glyph form: (Help)	ݤ	ـݤ	ـݤـ	ݤـ

In the Sindhi alphabet, the letter gaf with two dots above is used, and it is thus written as:

Position in word:	Isolated	Final	Medial	Initial
Glyph form: (Help)	ڱ	ـڱ	ـڱـ	ڱـ

There is also letter gueh in the Sindhi alphabet. Gueh is thus written as:

Position in word:	Isolated	Final	Medial	Initial
Glyph form: (Help)	ڳ	ـڳ	ـڳـ	ڳـ

Before 1928, the Nogai alphabet was written in Arabic script. There is one such letter based on a basic form of kāf with three dots below, and it is thus written as:

Position in word:	Isolated	Final	Medial	Initial
Glyph form: (Help)	ڮ	ـڮ	ـڮـ	ڮـ

In varieties of Arabic kāf is almost universally pronounced as the voiceless velar plosive /k/, but in rural Palestinian and Iraqi, it is pronounced as a voiceless postalveolar affricate [t͡ʃ].

Position in word:	Isolated	Final	Medial	Initial
Glyph form: (Help)	کٔ	ـکٔ	ـکٔـ	کٔـ

=== As an affix ===
==== Prefix ====
In Arabic, kāf, when used as a prefix كَـ ka, functions as a comparative preposition (أداة التشبيه, such as مِثْل /miθl/ or شَبَه /ʃabah/) and can carry the meaning of English words "like", "as", or "as though" . For example, كَطَائِر (/katˤaːʔir/), means "like a bird" or "as though a bird" (as in Hebrew, above) and attached to ذٰلِك /ðaːlik/ "this, that" forms the fixed expression كَذٰلِك /kaðaːlik/ "like so, likewise."

==== Possessive suffix ====
When adjoined at the end of a word, kāf is used as a possessive suffix for second-person singular nouns (feminine taking kāf-kasrah كِ, /ki/ and masculine kāf-fatḥah كَ /ka/); for instance, كِتَاب kitāb ("book") becomes كِتَابُكَ kitābuka ("your book", where the person spoken to is masculine) كِتَابُكِ kitābuki ("your book", where the person spoken to is feminine). At the ends of sentences and often in conversation the final vowel is suppressed, and thus كِتَابُك kitābuk ("your book"). In several varieties of vernacular Arabic, however, the kāf with no harakat is the standard second-person possessive, with the literary Arabic harakah shifted to the letter before the kāf: thus masculine "your book" in these varieties is كِتَابَك kitābak and feminine "your book" كِتَابِك kitābik.

== Hebrew kaf ==
Orthographic variants
Various print fonts			Cursive Hebrew	Solitreo	Rashi script
Serif	Sans-serif	Monospaced	Cursive Hebrew	Solitreo	Rashi script
כ	כ	כ			

Hebrew spelling: כַּף

=== Hebrew pronunciation ===
The letter kaf is one of the six letters that can receive a dagesh kal. The other five are bet, gimel, daleth, pe, and tav (see Hebrew alphabet for more about these letters).

There are two orthographic variants of this letter that alter the pronunciation:

Name	Symbol	IPA	Transliteration	Example
Kaf	כּ	[k]	k	kangaroo
Khaf	כ	[χ] or [x]	ḵ, ch, or kh	loch

==== Kaf with the dagesh ====
When the kaph has a "dot" in its center, known as a dagesh, it represents a voiceless velar plosive (/k/). There are various rules in Hebrew grammar that stipulate when and why a dagesh is used.

==== Kaf without the dagesh (khaf) ====
When this letter appears as כ without the dagesh ("dot") in its center it represents [χ], like the ch in German "Bach", or [x], like ch in Scottish English "loch".

In modern Israeli Hebrew the letter heth is often pronounced the same way. However, Mizrahi Jews and Israeli Arabs have differentiated between these letters as in other Semitic languages.

==== Final form of kaf ====
Orthographic variants
Various Print Fonts			Cursive Hebrew	Rashi script
Serif	Sans-serif	Monospaced	Cursive Hebrew	Rashi script
ך	ך	ך		

If the letter is at the end of a word the symbol is drawn differently. However, it does not change the pronunciation or transliteration in any way. The name for the letter is final kaf (kaf sofit). Four additional Hebrew letters take final forms: mem, nun, pei and tsadi. Kaf/khaf is the only Hebrew letter that can take a vowel in its word-final form, which is pronounced after the consonant, that vowel being the qamatz.

Name	Alternate name	Symbol
Final kaf	Kaf sofit	ךּ
Final khaf	Khaf sofit	ך

=== Significance of kaph in Hebrew ===
In gematria, kaph represents the number 20. Its final form represents 500, but this is rarely used, tav and qoph (400+100) being used instead.

As a prefix, kaph is a preposition:

- It can mean "like" or "as", as in literary Arabic (see above).
- In colloquial Hebrew, kaph and shin together have the meaning of "when". This is a contraction of כַּאֲשֶׁר, ka'asher (when).

== Syriac kap ==
Position in word:	Isolated	Final	Medial	Initial
Glyph form: (Help)	ܟ	ـܟ	ـܟـ	ܟـ

== Character encodings ==
Character information
Preview	כ		כּ		ך		ךּ	
Unicode name	HEBREW LETTER KAF		HEBREW LETTER KAF WITH DAGESH		HEBREW LETTER FINAL KAF		HEBREW LETTER FINAL KAF WITH DAGESH	
Encodings	decimal	hex	dec	hex	dec	hex	dec	hex
Unicode	1499	U+05DB	64315	U+FB3B	1498	U+05DA	64314	U+FB3A
UTF-8	215 155	D7 9B	239 172 187	EF AC BB	215 154	D7 9A	239 172 186	EF AC BA
Numeric character reference	&#1499;	&#x5DB;	&#64315;	&#xFB3B;	&#1498;	&#x5DA;	&#64314;	&#xFB3A;

Character information
Preview	ك		ﻛ		ﻜ		ﻚ	
Unicode name	ARABIC LETTER KAF		ARABIC LETTER KAF INITIAL FORM		ARABIC LETTER KAF MEDIAL FORM		ARABIC LETTER KAF FINAL FORM	
Encodings	decimal	hex	dec	hex	dec	hex	dec	hex
Unicode	1603	U+0643	65243	U+FEDB	65244	U+FEDC	65242	U+FEDA
UTF-8	217 131	D9 83	239 187 155	EF BB 9B	239 187 156	EF BB 9C	239 187 154	EF BB 9A
Numeric character reference	&#1603;	&#x643;	&#65243;	&#xFEDB;	&#65244;	&#xFEDC;	&#65242;	&#xFEDA;

Character information
Preview	𐤊		𐡊		ܟ	
Unicode name	PHOENICIAN LETTER KAF		IMPERIAL ARAMAIC LETTER KAPH		SYRIAC LETTER KAPH	
Encodings	decimal	hex	dec	hex	dec	hex
Unicode	67850	U+1090A	67658	U+1084A	1823	U+071F
UTF-8	240 144 164 138	F0 90 A4 8A	240 144 161 138	F0 90 A1 8A	220 159	DC 9F
UTF-16	55298 56586	D802 DD0A	55298 56394	D802 DC4A	1823	071F
Numeric character reference	&#67850;	&#x1090A;	&#67658;	&#x1084A;	&#1823;	&#x71F;

== See also ==
- Ca (Indic)
- Gaf
- Gueh
- Ka (Indic)
- Ngaph
